= Reich Music Days =

Nazi Germany propaganda

The Reich Music Days (German: Reichsmusiktage) took place from 22 to 29 May 1938 in Düsseldorf. They were a Nazi propaganda event under the patronage of Joseph Goebbels. Goebbels had originally planned an annual return of the Reichsmusiktage. These were held again in May 1939, but ceased to exist after the beginning of the Second World War.

== Context ==
In the Ideology of the Nazis a distinction was made between German and national art on the one hand and "cultural Bolshevism" and "degenerate art" on the other. Content-related and stylistic arguments were increasingly replaced by racist statements. The Nazis tried to promote the Gleichschaltung of art through special events and festivals and to make it accessible to the population as "German". These included the Reich Music Days, which were opened in Düsseldorf on 22 May 1938, the 125th birthday of Richard Wagner. They were under the patronage of Joseph Goebbels, who described them as an event for "declarations of musical policy principles and setting the course". The event lasted from 22–29 May and was organized by Heinz Drewes, the head of the music department in the Reich Ministry of Public Enlightenment and Propaganda.

== "Degenerate Music" exhibitions ==
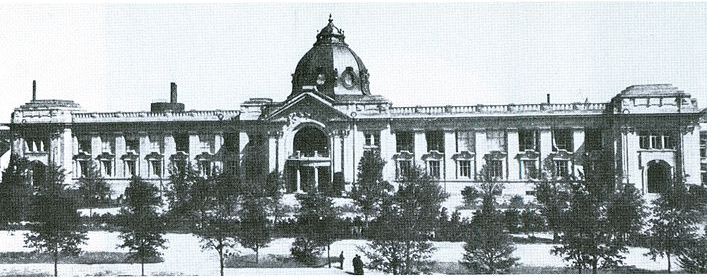
Düsseldorfer Kunstpalast (1902)

As part of the Reich Music Days, an exhibition was opened on May 24, 1938, in the Kunstpalast at Ehrenhof in Düsseldorf, under the name "Degenerate Music", which followed the "Degenerate Art Exhibition" in 1937 Munich. The main person responsible for the exhibition "Degenerate Music" was Hans Severus Ziegler, one of the earliest followers of Adolf Hitler and since 1935 General Director of the Deutsches Nationaltheater and Staatskapelle Weimar.

This exhibition publicly denounced music that did not fit into the Nazis' worldview, especially the works of Jewish artists. As in Munich before, deterrent examples of "degenerate music" were presented at this exhibition in Düsseldorf. In more than 50 display cases, one could see not only books, scores and stage sets, but also photographs and disparaging caricatures. In addition, at the push of a button it was possible to listen to excerpts from recordings of the denounced works.

In addition to musicians, the exhibition also denounced musicologists, music directors, music critics, music teachers and conductors, and described their works and writings as "degenerate". Both "non-Aryan" personalities such as Alban Berg, Arnold Schoenberg or Kurt Weill as well as "Aryan" musicians such as Paul Hindemith, whose wife Gertrud was considered Jewish, and Igor Stravinsky from Russia were ostracized.

The exhibition was on show in Düsseldorf until 14 June 1938 and was then shown in Weimar, Munich and Vienna. There was no accompanying catalogue, only the opening speech by Hans Severus Ziegler in the Düsseldorf Kunstpalast, which was printed as a brochure. On the front page of this brochure a black jazz saxophonist was shown as a caricature. What was provocative about it was, on the one hand, the deliberately overdrawn face, in contrast to the musician's clothing, tailcoat and top hat, and, on the other hand, the red Star of David, which was emblazoned in the buttonhole instead of a carnation. The Nazis chose this fictitious figure as the symbol of the exhibition and also of the entire Reich Music Days 1938 as the epitome of degeneracy. The caricature is reminiscent of the black musician Jonny, the title figure from Ernst Krenek's opera Jonny spielt auf, against which NSDAP members had already protested before 1933.

== Side events ==
In addition to this exhibition, the highlight of the Reich Music Days was a "cultural-political rally". Besides a speech by Reich Minister of Propaganda Goebbels and a speech by Gauleiter Friedrich Karl Florian, Richard Strauss himself conducted his "Festliches Präludium Op. 61", a work for orchestra and organ from 1913, which he arranged especially for this occasion. In addition, so-called "Platzkonzerte" were given in various squares throughout Düsseldorf, at least one musicology symposium was held, where the embodiment and representation of the "German" in musical culture was discussed. A total of three operas were also premiered.

Actually Goebbels had planned the Reichsmusiktage as a fixed annual event, but after a repeat in May 1939 it was not performed any more due to the Second World War.

== Reactions at home and abroad ==
Neither in Germany nor in the foreign press were the Reichsmusiktage 1938 perceived as a significant event. In contrast to the preceding art exhibition in Munich in 1937, both the "Degenerate Music" exhibition and the Reichsmusiktage as a whole were a failure for many followers of the Nazi cultural industry. Since mostly artists who had already emigrated abroad were sentenced, the entire event could not directly lead to confiscations or prohibitions. Likewise, the propagandistic evaluation of the exhibition was limited at the time, and the reactions from Germany and abroad were rather modest and reserved. While some newspapers at least expressed their amazement at why such famous composers as Hindemith and Stravinsky were classified as "degenerate", reactions from abroad remained strangely reserved. The magazine Musical America, which appears in the US, limited itself to listing only the works and composers classified as "degenerate". The London Times even seemed to show some understanding for this action, in keeping with the Appeasement of the time. The regime-loyal conductor Peter Raabe, then president of the Reichsmusikkammer, demonstratively stayed away from the opening ceremonies of the 1938 Reich Music Days. However, the Nazi censorship of the press and radio kept such negative reactions from the public.

== See also ==
- Music in Nazi Germany
- Musikwissenschaftliche Tagung 1938 with list of lectures on "Music and Race" and other topics
