= Hanns Ludwig Kormann =

German musician (1889–1965)

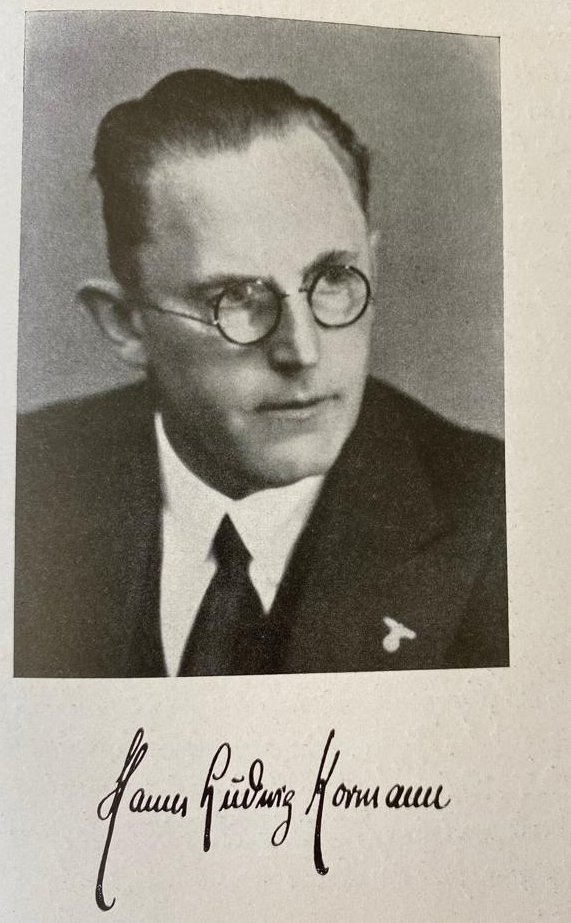

Hanns Ludwig Kormann (2 April 1889 – 18 February 1965) was a German conductor, composer, and tenor.

== Biography ==
Born on 2 April 1889, in Leipzig, Kormann began his musical career as a singer, engaged as a Heldentenor in the Hoftheater Oldenburg for the 1914–1915 season. He then became a soldier for the duration of World War I, returning in 1919 to take up conducting posts in Bromberg, Bielefeld, and Jössnitz.

Kormann joined the NSDAP (Nazi Party) in 1931 (Nr. 905,628). In close favour with Heinz Drewes, his operas experienced revivals and new premieres and several of his compositions were commercially released. He later co-ordinated Unterhaltungsmusik for the Reichsmusikprüfstelle. He was transferred to occupied Krakow where he ended the war. After the war, he returned to Buchholz, but was banned from public and radio performance for his political activities. After completing denazification in 1948, he moved to Erfurt, and finally Kalk, Cologne, where he died on 18 February 1965.

== Selected works ==
=== Operas ===
- Der Ritter von der Humpenburg, Komische Oper in einem Akt. Libretto after August von Kotzebue by Hans Peter Schmiedel.
- Der Käficht, Komische Oper in einem Akt. Libretto after August von Kotzebue by Hans Peter Schmiedel. Premiere 1 February 1923, Leipzig.
- Belcanto, komische Oper. Premiere 1926, Bamberg.
- Der Meister von Palmyra. Libretto after Adolf Wilbrandt by Carl Willnau. Premiere 18 November 1934, Altenburg.
- Der Dreispitz (later retitled as Der verliebte Caballero). Libretto after Alarcón by Carl Willnau. Premiere 18 February 1936, Altenburg.
