= Music in Nazi Germany =

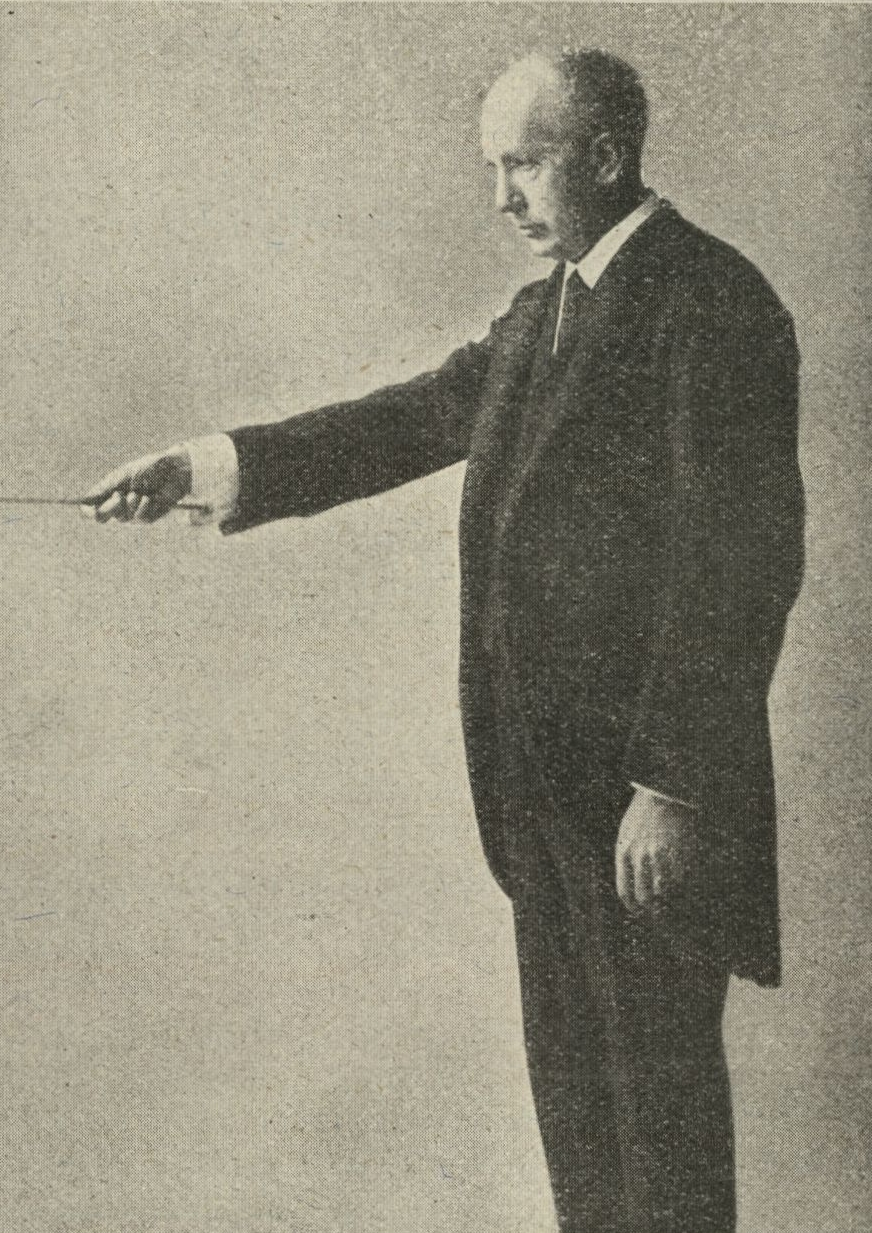
Composer and conductor Richard Strauss was appointed to be the head of the Reich Chamber of Music, but was later forced to resign because of his association with the Jewish librettist of one of his operas.

Music in Nazi Germany, like all cultural activities in the regime, was controlled and "co-ordinated" (Gleichschaltung) by various entities of the state and the Nazi Party, with Propaganda Minister Joseph Goebbels and the prominent Nazi theorist Alfred Rosenberg playing leading – and competing – roles. The primary concerns of these organizations was to exclude Jewish composers and musicians from publishing and performing music, and to prevent the public exhibition of music considered to be "Jewish", "anti-German", or otherwise "degenerate", while at the same time promoting the work of favored "Germanic" composers, such as Richard Wagner, Ludwig van Beethoven and Anton Bruckner. These works were believed to be positive contributions to the Volksgemeinschaft, or German folk community.

The Nazis promoted Aryan ideologies through heavy censorship and cultural control, blacklisting Jewish compositions, banning specific concert hall performances, and controlling radio content in order to promote nationalism through cultural unity. By controlling the mediums of communication, the Reich Chamber of Culture was able to dictate public opinion in regards to musical culture, and reaffirm their hegemonic beliefs, promoting "Aryan" works consistent with Nazi ideology.

Propaganda Minister Joseph Goebbels famously decreed radio to be "the most influential and important intermediary between a spiritual movement and the nation, between the idea and the people". He put much effort into the exploitation of radio technologies and its ability to reach the German populace regardless of their socioeconomic status. To this end, a low-cost "people's receiver" (Volksempfänger) was introduced.

== Background ==
The nineteenth century introduced a change in economic circumstances in Germany. The rise of industrialization and urban expansion introduced a new marketplace for music. Individuals were able to participate within the music culture as small social clubs and orchestras were easily able to purchase sheet music and instruments. Out of this developed an extensive network of music among German citizens. This spawned more localized concert halls and orchestras, greatly increasing the circulation of both Jewish and non-Jewish compositions.

When Adolf Hitler and the Nazi Party took power in Germany, it stepped in to control these cultural music products as part of its general policy of Gleichschaltung or "co-ordination". In a speech made in 1935, Propaganda Minister Joseph Goebbels proclaimed the goals of the Nazi control of German music. Music, he said, should be German, it should be volksverbunden, or linked to the volk, the German nation, and it should express the soul of Germany, die deutsche Seele. Unfortunately how to interpret these Romantic goals was left up to each of the competing authorities, who wondered if one key was more "Nordic" than another, and what was the Jewish influence on music. As one modern author summed it up: "They wanted neither a simple return to nineteenth-century Romanticism nor a continuation of Weimar avant-garde but also no experimentation."

== Nazi control of music ==
=== Influence of Hitler ===
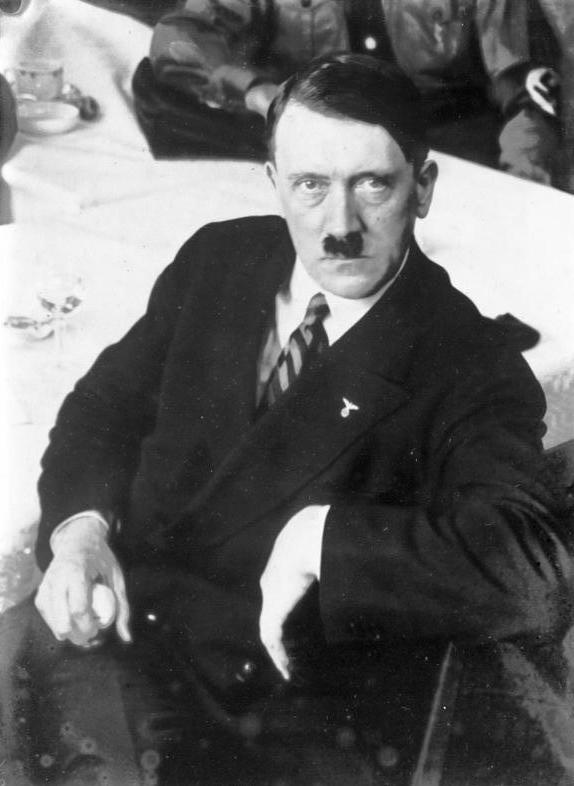
Adolf Hitler (1932)

As with most other aspects of the governance of the Third Reich, the personal views and preferences of Adolf Hitler played a significant role in the Nazi control of music. Hitler's normal modus operandi was to create overlapping and competing agencies within both the Nazi Party and the German state apparatus, and allow the heads of those agencies to "work toward the Führer". Hitler would either make his preferences known, or, if he did not, the agency leaders would make assumptions about what they were, and then — usually without specific orders or guidance from Hitler — they would gear their decisions to what they believed he wanted. The overlapping of the various competencies would often lead to conflicts, which would then be brought to Hitler for ultimate settlement. Hitler, however, did not like to make these decisions, and often let the situations fester for long periods before he either made a snap decision, or one choice had become the most obvious one to select. This was the case in the realm of music, where Nazi theorist Alfred Rosenberg and Goebbels were pitted against each other, and their somewhat differing goals and ideological viewpoints often lead to conflicts. Usually, after the creation of the Reich Chamber of Culture, Goebbels had the upper hand, but at times Rosenberg would prevail, or at least manage to disrupt Goebbels' plans.

In regard to music, Hitler had definite views as to what was acceptable and what was not. He was passionate about the music of Richard Wagner, but denounced most contemporary music — which featured atonality, dissonance, and disturbing rhythms in many cases influenced by what Hitler referred to as "nigger jazz" — as being "degenerate" and elitist. Soon after Hitler became Chancellor in 1933, contemporary music concerts, as well as Modernist and Expressionist scenic design and staging of operas were cancelled, and the music of Alban Berg, Hans Eisler, Paul Hindemith, Arnold Schoenberg, Anton von Webern, Kurt Weill, and other formerly prominent composers, as well as Jewish composers such as Felix Mendelssohn, Giacomo Meyerbeer, Jacques Offenbach and even George Gershwin and Irving Berlin, were no longer programmed or performed. At the beginning, this was not the result of a coordinated centralized program, but were uncoordinated spontaneous actions by local Nazi officials "working towards the Fuhrer", and generally reflected Hitler's often-expressed views on music.

In one instance, Hitler himself complained about these local efforts. After Adolf Busch, a violinist, conductor, and composer, was forced to leave Germany, he said "It is really a shame that we do not have gauleiter in Dresden who knows anything about the arts. ... Busch would have been the best German conductor. But [Gauleiter] Mutschmann wanted to put old party comrades in the orchestra so as to introduce the National Socialist spirit." As a music aficionado who did not want Germany to lose talented musicians, Hitler was, in fact, less doctrinaire about the personal political backgrounds of musicians than were many Nazis, such as Rosenberg. For instance, Hitler's fondness for the operettas of Franz Lehár took precedence over the negative facts about the composer discovered by Rosenberg's investigation. The same occurred with the partly Jewish Johann Strauss: Hitler's enjoyment of Strauss' compositions removed any impediments to their being performed, although Goebbels took steps to make sure that Strauss' heritage never became public knowledge.

Hitler also lashed out at those Nazis who would ban Mozart's The Magic Flute because of its Masonic theme, or wanted to suppress Christian religious music, which he deemed to be part of "the German cultural patrimony". He also was willing, in the interest of foreign policy, to relax the general requirement of "Germanness" in concert music, allowing Italian operas, even Modernist ones, to be performed, and the music of Hungarian composer Zoltán Kodály and sometimes even those of the Hungarian anti-Nazi Bela Bartók. Foreign policy considerations entered into the decision to allow the works of Finnish composer Jean Sibelius to be performed, and performances of works by Russian composers dating from before the October Revolution, such as Tchaikovsky, Mussorgsky and Rimsky-Korsakov were sanctioned. Even Igor Stravinsky fell in and out of official favor.

Hitler's direct, personal involvement in musical matters was generally limited to appointing conductors and awarding the title of "Professor" and other music-related honorifics, approving grants for both institutions and individuals, and ruling on the use of certain compositions such as the "Badenweiler March" — which could only be played in his presence — or the "Nibelungen March", which he deemed appropriate only for formal Nazi Party occasions. He also set the approved tempi for the "Deutschlandlied", the national anthem, and the "Horst-Wessel-Lied", the Party's anthem and later the co-national anthem. In most other instances, as was typical for Hitler, he allowed his paladins a free hand.

It was Hitler's goal that music in Germany should be as important as he imagined it was in ancient Greece, and should serve the public good. Thus composers should write music that was aesthetically pleasing to most people, and the state should make that music available to the people. Such music would also help promote the state by providing its credibility, both culturally and politically, and distract the world from the Nazi street terrorism which was helping to create the totalitarian Führer state. Despite Germany being, in general, a sophisticated musical culture, the "co-ordination" (Gleichschaltung) of German music took less effort than any of the other arts, with fewer non-Jewish musical personalities choosing to emigrate into exile. It was also a factor that once Hitler took power, he showed less interest in music than he did on controlling painting and sculpture. In those fields, ideologically impure artists were sometimes threatened with being sent to a concentration camp. Ideologically suspect composers were, for the most part, allowed to continue writing music, and even at times managed to see them performed, unlike suspected painters and sculptors who had their works and material confiscated.

=== Nazi agencies ===
Competing Nazi entities separately claimed control of all musicians and publications of musical material, each hoping to eventually become the administration of all culture, including music, in Nazi Germany. Alfred Rosenberg, who saw himself as the Party's chief ideologue, played a key role in the early days before Hitler came to power, spawning many sub-organizations such as the Party's Militant League for German Culture (Kampfbund für deutsche Kultur). This organization had departments for music, cinema, visual arts, and radio. In hopes of strengthening "suppressed" Aryan artists and eliminating "degenerate" artists, such as Jewish and jazz artists, Rosenberg's institutions published many inflammatory brochures warning citizens of non-German nationalist music. His institution funded Aryan musicians and even went as far as to disrupt concerts, threaten Jewish performers and intimidate audiences. These practices were the beginning of the overarching political intervention of concert halls and orchestras of the 19th century.

In March 1933 Hitler appointed Joseph Goebbels to be the Minister of Public Enlightenment and Propaganda. It was Goebbels' intention to have his ministry take control of all German culture, but he ran up against Rosenberg's already-existing Party infrastructure. Fortunately for him, Rosenberg's activist stance had caused considerable disruption, which had become politically inconvenient for Hitler. This allowed Goebbels to convince the Führer to sign a decree creating the Reich Chamber of Culture (Reichskulturkammer) on September 22, 1933, with Goebbels as president. Within the Chamber were divisions for each of the arts, including the Reich Chamber of Music (Reichsmusikkammer), to which all musicians and composers were required to belong if they wished to work; those rejected were effectively professionally banned. Goebbels used the Chambers not only to regulate the arts, but also to improve pensions and get rid of unqualified and untrained artists. The ministry controlled the Chambers through the senior artists involved, who ran them on a daily basis. By 1937, the Reich Chamber of Music had 95,600 members.

==== Goebbels v. Rosenberg ====
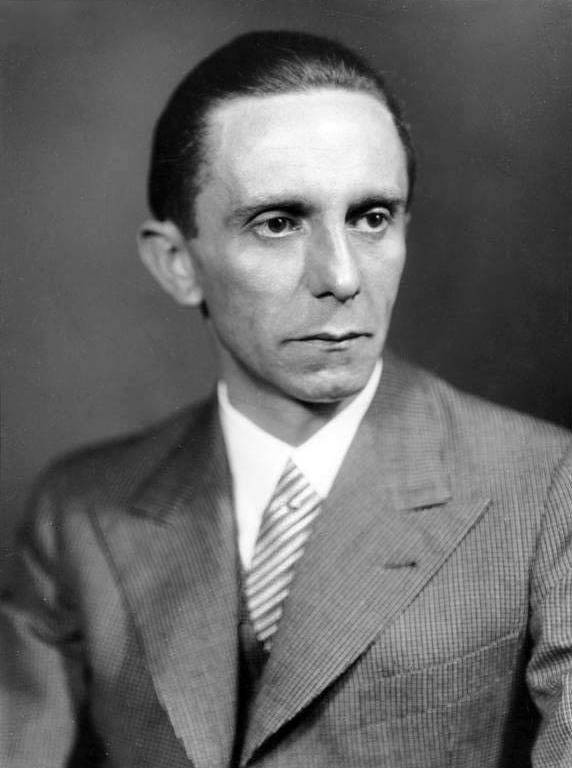
Joseph Goebbels

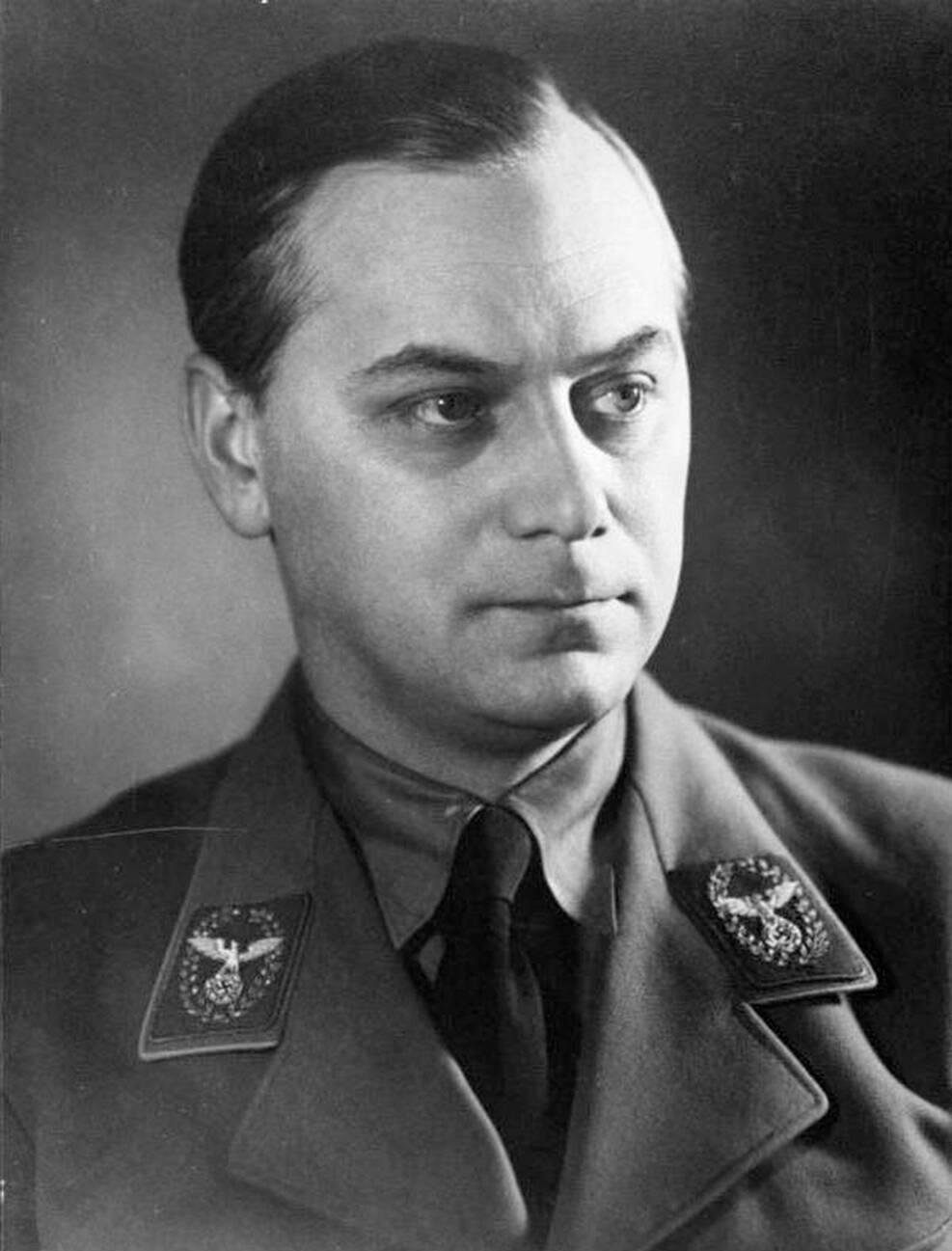
Alfred Rosenberg

The creation of the Chamber of Culture set up a long-term struggle between Goebbels and Rosenberg for control of the culture of Nazi Germany, including music. Rosenberg directly attacked some of the artists picked by Goebbels to head up the constituent Chambers, for instance calling the appointment of Richard Strauss as head of the Chamber of Music a "cultural scandal", because the libretto of his comic opera Die schweigsame Frau ("The Silent Woman") was written by a Jew. Goebbels was furious, and pointed out that librettist was not Arnold Zweig, as claimed by Rosenberg, but a different person, the Austrian Jew Stefan Zweig. Eventually, the Gestapo intercepted a damning letter from Strauss to Stefan Zweig which forced Goebbels to ask Strauss to resign. Rosenberg also attacked Paul Hindemith.

Eventually, though, Rosenberg could not win against Goebbels, who was both Minister of Propaganda for the German state and the head of propaganda for the Nazi Party, giving him a great deal more power than Rosenberg, who held only Party positions. Rosenberg's Fighting League was renamed the "National Socialist Cultural Community" and hung on until 1937, overshadowed by Goebbels' organization, and Rosenberg himself received the grandiloquent title "Representative for the Führer for the Overall Philosophical and Intellectual Training and Education of the National Socialist Party." Goebbels' advantage over Rosenberg was that he had the frequent ear of the Führer, which Rosenberg did not, as Hitler did not have great respect for him; he considered the ideologue to be weak and lazy, and kept him at arm's length. Rosenberg's advantage was that his personal taste in music was closer to Hitler's than Goebbels' was: Goebbels had appreciation for some Modern music, which Hitler definitely did not share. Nevertheless, by 1939, Rosenberg had for the most part abandoned the cultural field to Goebbels and concentrated instead on foreign policy.

==== Other Nazi leaders ====
Other high-ranking Nazis with an interest in German music included Hermann Göring, who, as Minister-President of Prussia controlled many cultural institutions in that state; Bernhard Rust, the Minister of Education, who was in charge of overseeing music conservatories and music in German schools; Robert Ley, the head of the German Labour Front, whose usurping of the trade unions brought in many musicians; and Baldur von Schirach, the head of the Hitler Youth, who controlled music in Vienna.

Although these other powerful Nazis were in some respect in competition with Goebbels, (Note: Goebbels and Ley reached an accommodation, in which Ley withdrew from his attempts to influence the control of music in return for Goebbels' support for the German Labour Front's "Strength Through Joy" program.) they nevertheless were all in agreement about the desired result, which was the removal of Jewish musicians and composers and the suppression of their music. Although it took longer than it might have, because of objections from the Economics Ministry about the possible damage to the economy, by mid-1935 Jews had been effectively removed from German culture – including music – through suppression, censorship and emigration. All musical organizations, from local chorals to professional symphonies, including the Berlin Philharmonic, had been purged of Jewish members. This was largely made possible by the Law for the Restoration of the Professional Civil Service, which dated from April 1933. This law essentially dismissed hundreds of Jewish citizens from civil service, including musicians and composers – who were civil servants – from German orchestras and concert halls. More than any other law, this one pushed Jewish musicians out of German culture at large.

==== Blacklists ====
Because of the multiplicity of authorities involved in controlling music, there was often confusion about what was and was not allowed to be performed. To help alleviate this problem, in June 1935, Richard Strauss, who headed the Reich Music Chamber, published a register of three categories of operas that were permitted, and later in the year a list of 108 compositions which were "under no circumstances to be performed." Berlin Radio also distributed an error-filled list of 99 composers whose works were forbidden, which was later corrected.

In 1937, Goebbels transferred the authority of the Music Chamber to the Ministry of Propaganda, in order to more directly control the realm of music in Nazi Germany, through the Reich Music Censorship Board (Reichsmusikprüfstelle), whose remit included all music publication, programming, broadcasting, and recording. This board also disseminated lists of proscribed works.

=== Concert halls ===
Within the music realm Goebbels initially focused on the rapidly expanding concert hall industry. With the increase of both music publications and instrument production, a public sphere of music emerged. German citizens were able to exchange music unlike ever before, increasing circulation of all genres of music. Since the performance of Jewish or Romani music was prohibited by the state, this expanding circulation of sheet music was problematic. In an effort to regain control of this industry, and eliminate degenerate music, Goebbels soon instituted a harsh purge of Jewish musicians.

The Chamber of Culture specifically promoted art produced by "Aryans" whose views were consistent with Nazi ideologies. The organization blacklisted many Jewish musicians and composers from performing live in concert halls. The Chamber of Culture famously banned Jewish composer, conductor and pianist Bruno Walter from performing in public in 1933. Walter's performance in Leipzig was cancelled due to "threats of violence." Four days later Walter was officially blacklisted when Richard Strauss replaced him at the Berlin Philharmonic Hall. (Note: Strauss would later show his loyalty to the Nazi regime when he also replaced banned conductor Fritz Busch and then the Italian anti-Fascist conductor Arturo Toscanini to conduct their concerts. He would later accept the position of President of the Chamber of Music when it was created. He was later forced out of the post after conflicts with Goebbels. Given Strauss's international celebrity, Goebbels allowed him to travel as a cultural ambassador for Germany, but he remained excluded from the center of cultural power. See Evans 2005, pp. 188–190)

Being German or "Aryan" was not the sole consideration in determining whether a composer's music would be allowed to be presented in Nazi Germany. Modernist or atonal music was discouraged even when the composers were German or Austrian. Arnold Schoenberg's pupils, for instance, such as Anton von Webern and Alban Berg, adhered to twelve-tone techniques and were therefore singled out by the regime for suppression. (Note: A critic who gave Berg's opera Lulu a good review was expelled from the German Music Critics' Association, and the conductor emigrated to Argentina.) Winfried Zillig, on the other hand, used the same techniques, but in a more tonal way, and his works depicted the self-sacrificing heroism of German peasants and other subjects close to Nazi ideology, so he was allowed to have his music performed and continued to conduct.

Goebbels was also well aware of diplomatic and foreign policy considerations, so the works of Hungarian modernist composer Béla Bartók were not banned, because Hungary was Germany's ally – even though Bartók himself was anti-Fascist. When his publisher was Aryanized, he switch to another one, he declared solidarity with banned composers, and protested when his music was not included in the "Degenerate Music" Exhibition. Igor Stravinsky, on the other hand, did have his works included in the show, but nevertheless, despite attacks by Rosenberg, it continued to be performed in Germany, and Stravinsky collected the royalties in Paris.

These factors and the banning of Jewish influences produced a music industry based on Aryanism and focused primarily on classical German composers. Goebbels believed that music could create a public emotional and spiritual experience competitive with religion. Concert halls with their darkened auditoriums and formal settings exposed the audience to an experience similar to that of going to church. The music of Bruckner and Wagner were the centerpiece of the new "Aryan" spirituality, aiming to attain the same "impact generated by traditional Christian religious ecstasy and devotion". Goebbels strongly believed music could bring about national pride through cultural identification.

==== Hindemith and Furtwängler ====
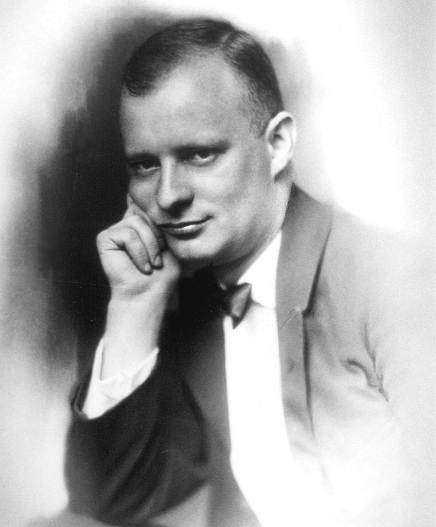
Paul Hindemith

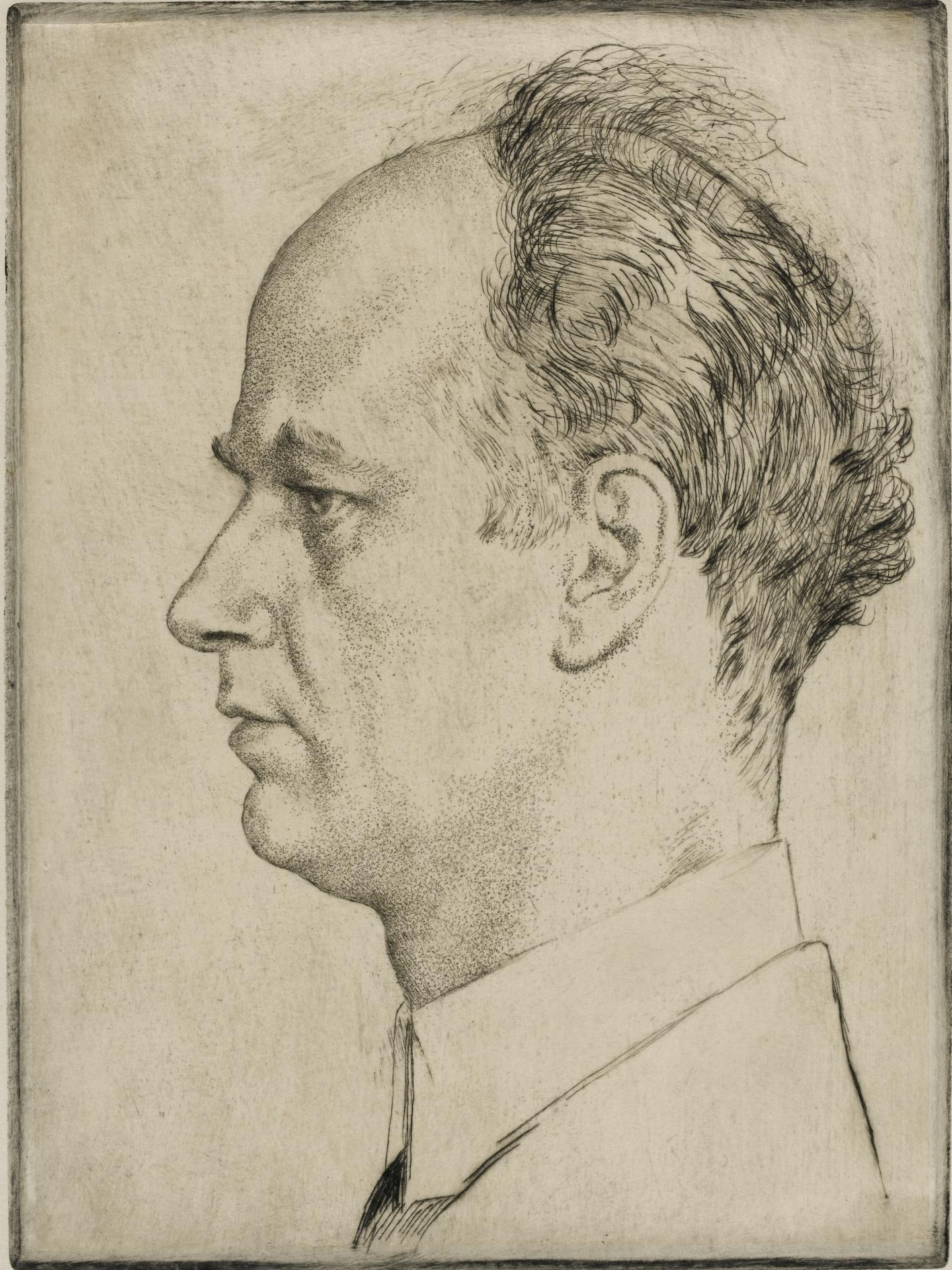
Wilhelm Furtwängler

Conflict between Goebbels and Rosenberg had not ended with the creation of the Chamber of Culture. For instance, they battled over the composer Paul Hindemith. As an enfant terrible Hindemith had composed in a modernist style, but changed to a neo-Classical style in 1930. Goebbels wished to keep Hindemith in Germany because his international recognition was second only to Strauss'. He was appointed to the governing council of the Chamber of Music's Composers' Section and his new compositions were given prestigious premieres. Unlike Goebbels, however, who appreciated more modern music, Rosenberg's tastes were strictly old-fashioned, more in line with Hitler's, and he launched a series of attacks on Hindemith's previous musical style and his earlier political affiliations. That his wife was half-Jewish did not help his case. Rosenberg pressured radio stations not to play Hindemith's works and concert halls not to program them.

The noted conductor Wilhelm Furtwängler defended Hindemith in an article in a daily newspaper, but did so in a way that denigrated political criteria being used to judge art, and defending artistic freedom. While Furtwängler received a very positive response from the audience when he took the rostrum to conduct that night, Goebbels was in the audience, as was Göring, and he subsequently closed ranks with Rosenberg to counter the implicit criticism of the regime's cultural policies. The Propaganda Minister forced Furtwängler out of all his numerous official positions, but did not ban him from working. Goebbels subsequently relented somewhat, but kept the conductor on a short leash, telling him that if he accepted a guest conductor opportunity with the New York Philharmonic, he would not be allowed back into Germany.

Hindemith, meanwhile, took an indefinite leave of absence from his teaching job in Berlin, but stayed in Germany. He made efforts to distance himself from his previous musical styles, worked on musical education, and swore an oath of allegiance to Hitler. His works were performed in small concert venues, but the attacks on him continued and were sufficient to discourage major music institutions from hiring him or programming his music. In 1936, responding to a speech by Hitler urging that the regime increase its efforts to purify the arts, the Propaganda Ministry banned performances of Hindemith's music. Hindemith emigrated to Switzerland in 1938, and from there to the United States.

=== Jean Sibelius and Hitler’s Germany ===
Sibelius was awarded the Goethe Medal in 1935 for his music, which was said to "overflow with national spirit." That same year, Sibelius received another honor from Nazi Germany — the Brahms Medal.

The Sibelius Society was established on Goebbels' orders in April 1942. Additionally, from 1941 onwards, Sibelius received an artist's pension from Germany, amounting to half the average annual income of a German citizen at the time.

Finland's national broadcaster Yleisradio sent a speech by Sibelius to Berlin, in which he referred to the shared destiny of Finland and Germany. Finland fought alongside Germany in World War II with hopes to recapture territory conquered by the Soviet Union (Russia) in the so-called Winter War (where Finland had to defend itself without any allies).

In the Wehrmacht's guidebook for soldiers Sibelius’ music was described as follows: "Heroic audacity and a tendency toward mystical contemplation go hand in hand, as does an awareness of life’s hardships and a love for serene and mysterious nature. No one else can sense the soul of a people and a fatherland as he can."

Sibelius’ wife, Aino Sibelius, was also known for her interest in pro-Nazi views.

=== Degenerate Music ===
In May 1938, as part of the first Reich Music Rally, Hans Severus Ziegler assembled in Düsseldorf an exhibition of "Degenerate Music" (Entartete Musik). Ziegler, the manager of the national theatre in Weimar, was inspired by the tremendously popular "Degenerate Art Exhibition" which had been presented the year before in Munich. The exhibition featured sections on Jewish composers and conductors, modernist and atonal music, jazz, and other subjects. Ziegler positioned the show as presenting examples of Cultural Bolshevism, saying at the opening ceremony:

What's been gathered together in [this] exhibition constitutes the portrayal of a true witches' sabbath and the most frivolous spiritual-artistic cultural bolshevism and a portrayal of the triumph of subhumanity, of arrogant Jewish insolence and total spiritual senile dementia.

Booths had been installed where attendees could listen to specially made records with excerpts of "Degenerate Music". However, long lines at the booth for Kurt Weill's Threepenny Opera showed that not all of the music presented at the exhibition was disliked by the public.

Ziegler had mounted the show with help from Rosenberg's staff, so it was perhaps inevitable that Goebbels would not totally approve of it. He wrote in his diary that the exhibition was "getting a lot of criticism. I get the objectionable parts removed." Goebbels' disapproval may account for the exhibition running only for three weeks.

== Radio and popular music ==
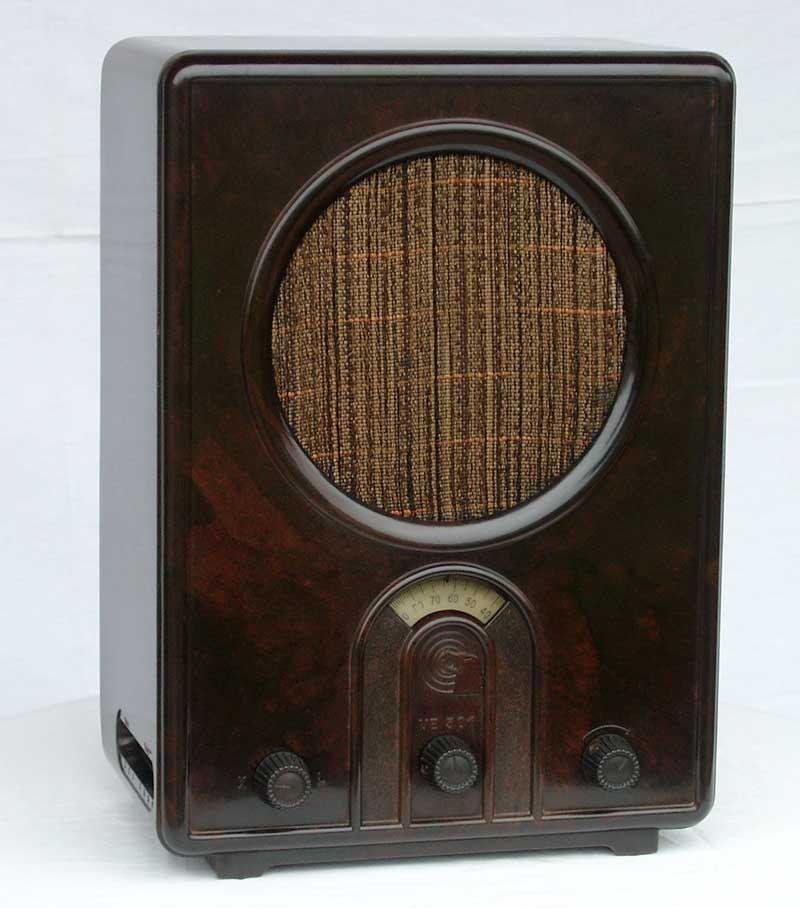
A Volksempfänger ("people's receiver")

Goebbels famously stated that the radio is an instrumental tool for the nation-state to influence the masses. In "Radio as the Eighth Great Power" Goebbels stresses the importance of the radio as an intermediary between the government and the nation. He blamed the profit-driven radio industry for diluting the political potential of this medium. The corporate entities focused more on profit than political enlightenment, motivating Goebbels to institute strict Nazi control of the industry.

The Office of Radio Technology released the Volksempfänger, "the people’s receiver", in August 1933. The low price of 76 German Reichsmarks, roughly two weeks pay, enabled the broad masses to become radio consumers. The units were, however, not of good quality and they broke down often. With spare parts difficult to come by, a thriving black market sprang up for them.

Under the Chamber of Culture the Party Propaganda Department, or Reichspropagandaleitung, was responsible for radio regulation. The radio division was split into three offices: Cultural Radio and Radio Organization, Radio Technology, and Radio Propaganda. The Office of Radio propaganda censored music and programming, adhering to the strict authority seen in the concert hall regulation.

Goebbels understood that while the radio was an effective mechanism to disseminate propaganda, radio programming could not be dominated by propaganda because the listener would get bored and tune out. Even as early as May 1934, he was turning down requests from high Nazi officials for airtime, and he insisted to radio station managements that a mixture of interesting and imaginative content, including music – and not primarily martial music. "The first law," he wrote to them in March 1933, "is don't be boring!" In spite of this admonition, at first speeches by Hitler and other propaganda dominated the radio airways. For the Mayday celebrations in 1934, 17 hours of speeches, songs, and marches were broadcast.

Over time, between 1932 and 1939 the amount of time given over to music gradually increased to 33%, and a full 87.5% of that was popular music. By 1944, the radio network broadcast 190 hours of content, of which 71 hours was popular music and 24 was classical music. Because it was wartime, some listeners objected to the broadcasting of popular music, especially those in rural areas, who objected to crooners and dance music. But these programs were popular with German troops and those in the Labour Service, and the morale value of the music won out.

Stations played music of approved "Aryan" composers such as Wagner, prohibiting any Jewish compositions or "degenerate music" such as the newly popular American jazz. Goebbels acknowledged the importance of pop music, claiming "Not all music suits everyone. Therefore that style of entertaining music that is found among the broad masses also has a right to exist". Unlike degenerate music, pop music was accepted as long as it reiterated the theme of nationalism. "Everything should include the theme of our great reconstructive work, or at least not stand in its way". He stressed that popular music and entertainment, though not directly affecting political enlightenment, provides cultural enrichment and a potential step towards cultural imperialism.

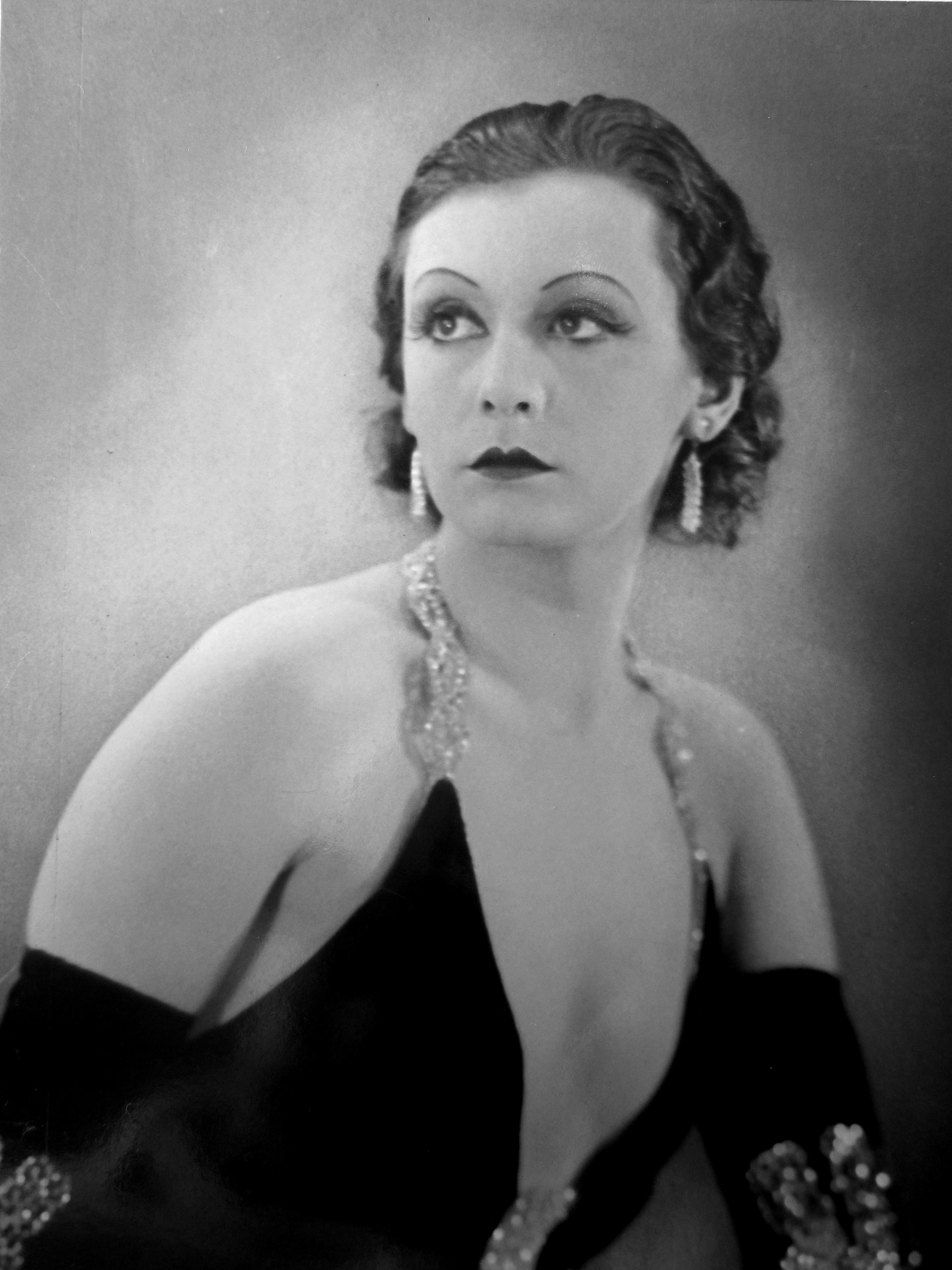
Zarah Leander (1931)

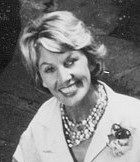
Lale Andersen (c.1951)

Especially popular with the public was the "request concert" in which hit songs and other entertainment music was played, in style essentially unchanged from that of the Weimar Republic. Also popular were sentimental songs such as "Ich weiss, es wird einmal ein Wunder geschehen" [I know, one day a miracle will come] by Zarah Leander, and Lale Andersen singing "Es geht alles vorüber, es geht alles vorbei" [It'll all be over / It'll end one day], which the German troops in the Battle of Stalingrad huddled around radios to listen to, as well as her "Lili Marleen", which was also sung to Allied soldiers as "My Lili of the Lamplight" by Marlene Dietrich and Vera Lynn, and by Suzy Solidor in a French version. Goebbels was not pleased with that song's tone of pessimism and nostalgia, and he had Andersen arrested in September 1942 for undermining the morale of the troops, blackballing her until the middle of 1943. At her first concert after returning to public performances, "Lili Marleen" was not included in the programme, and the audience called for her to sing it. When she did not, they sang it themselves. The song was subsequently banned outright in August 1944. Near the end of the war, British officials broadcast the German version of the song across the English Channel, hoping to depress the German troops.

The various number of bureaucrats and committees involved in the radio industry resulted an unorthodox structure. The lack of unified organization across the industry was a hindrance to productivity and a sign of corruption, according to Goebbels. State-regulated radio was necessary to meet the needs of the masses, placing their common good in the forefront. With the Propaganda Ministry in place, after August 1939 Goebbels exercised complete control of the radio industry from content to distribution. Now instead of regulating music on the local level in concert halls, Goebbels and the Chamber of Culture had centralized control of the massively influential medium of radio. Through the saturation of German nationalist music and boycotting of Jewish compositions, Goebbels harnessed cultural products to further political control.

As with classical music, Jewish popular entertainers were forced to stop performing, and were frequently sent to concentration camps. The cabaret artist Fritz Grünbaum was turned away at the border when he tried to leave Austria after the Anschluss for Czechoslovakia, and was sent to Buchenwald and later to Dachau, where he died in 1941. The noted Bohemian lyricist Fritz Löhner-Beda, who had collaborated on operas with Franz Lehár, spent time in Dachau and Buchenwald before being sent to Auschwitz, where he was beaten to death in the Monowitz sub-camp. The Silesian writer of hit songs, Ralf Erwin, left Germany in 1933 after the Nazi seizure of power, but was later captured in France, and died in an internment camp there.

The advent of swing music, pioneered in the United States by clarinetist Benny Goodman and his groups, caught on with European youths in a major way. Nazi officials could not stop it completely – even though, like all forms of jazz it was derided as "Negermusik" ("Negro music") – but did attempt to control it. For instance, the official swing band of Nazi Germany was Charlie's Orchestra, which also had a radio following in the UK. Still, even SS officers posted to Paris after the defeat of France in 1940 would go to jazz clubs, despite the official disapproval of the music.

== See also ==
- Art in Nazi Germany
- Aryanism
- Negermusik, derogatory term used in Nazi Germany for jazz and other music that were associated with black people
- Reich Music Days, a propaganda event
