= Heinz Drewes =

German conductor

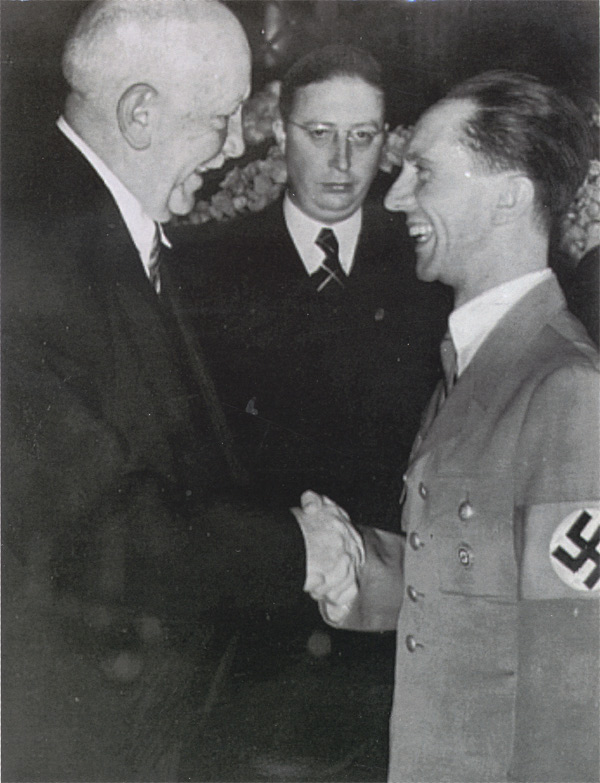
Richard Strauss (left), generalintendant of Reichsmusikprüfstelle Heinz Drewes and Joseph Goebbels in 1938.

Heinz Drewes (1903–1980) was a German conductor and 1937–1944 head of division X (music) of Reichsministerium für Volksaufklärung und Propaganda at the time when Reichsmusikkammer was led by Peter Raabe from 1935 onwards. He was one of the most influential people in the German music world at that time. Drewes was head of division X (music) subordinated divisions: Reich Music Examination Office, Reichsstelle für Musikbearbeitungen, Auslandsstelle für Musik, Amt für Konzertwesen.

== Career ==
Drewes and Raabe struggled "the leadership in music," and this made Joseph Goebbels happy as he could use their words as a threat to one or the other.

Drewes worked in Deutsches Nationaltheater und Staatskapelle Weimar as a répétiteur and conductor. In 1930, he went to Landestheater in Altenburg (Theater & Philharmonie Thüringen) as a conductor. He started there a local chapter for KfdK (Kampfbund für deutsche Kultur) and the same year he went to NSDAP and wrote articles in NS-Zeitung and Völkischer Beobachter. Deutscher Musiker-Kalender tells in 1943 he was Generalintendant and Generalmusikdirektor.

Denazified Drewes worked after the war in Nürnberg Conservatory. Later, a story emerged that Drewes used pseudonyms when he was working in the propaganda ministry. He conducted only with the radio orchestras. It was he who hired and fired the conductors. He may have used the name Hermann Desser when he conducted Felix Draeseke's Symphonia Tragica with the Berlin Symphony Orchestra, published in 1955 by Urania Records. Alan Krueck says there is no such conductor as Hermann Desser, and the music was typical for the Third Reich. On the other hand, the quality of the recording was consistent with what was achievable at the time. Later Christoph Schlüren also identifies Drewes.

Drewes appreciated Jean Sibelius who was the president of the German Sibelius Society (Deutsche Sibelius Gesellschaft). He wrote a preface to Ernst Tanzberger's dissertation Die symphonischen Dichtungen, von Jean Sibelius, eine inhalts- und formanalytische Studie (K. Triltsch, 1943). Tommi Mäkelä writes in his Sibelius biography that it was explicitly meant to be a greeting 'to our Finnish friends and comrades-in-arm.' Drewes himself writes that the symphonic sagas of Sibelius evidence that "while the Finnish Volk could be counted racially among the Finno-Ugric tribe," over centuries it had "turned happily toward the German world".

Drewes was a friend of Richard Strauss, who asked him to extend his protection to Strauss' librettist Joseph Gregor. Strauss again asked for protection in 1939 from his non-Aryan daughter-in-law and grandchildren.

The Swedish composer Kurt Atterberg was worried about the German conductor Helmuth Thierfelder whether he could conduct Attenberg's compositions, and about his possibility of visiting Sweden.

The concertmaster of Philharmonischen Orchester Landestheater Coburg Ralph Braun says the significance of Drewes has not been known until today.
