= Cultural Bolshevism =

Nazi slogan opposing modernist and progressive cultural movements

Cultural Bolshevism (German: Kulturbolschewismus), sometimes referred to specifically as art Bolshevism, music Bolshevism or sexual Bolshevism, was a term widely used by state-sponsored critics in Nazi Germany to denounce casual clothing and secularist, modernist and progressive cultural movements. The term is closely related to the Jewish Bolshevism conspiracy theory.

This first became an issue during the 1920s in Weimar Germany, when German artists such as Max Ernst and Max Beckmann were denounced by Adolf Hitler, the Nazi Party, and other German nationalists as "cultural Bolsheviks". Nazi claims about attacks on conceptions of family, identity, music, art and intellectual life were generally referred to as cultural Bolshevism, the Bolsheviks being the Marxist revolutionary movement in Russia.

"Cultural Marxism" is a contemporary variant of the term which is used to refer to the far-right antisemitic Cultural Marxism conspiracy theory. This variant of the term was used by far-right terrorist Anders Breivik in the introductory chapter of his manifesto.

== History ==
The development of modern art at the beginning of the 20th century, albeit with roots going back to the 1860s, denoted a revolutionary divergence from traditional artistic values to ones based on the personal perceptions and feelings of the artists. This rejection of traditional authority, intimately linked to the Industrial Revolution, the individualistic values of the Age of Enlightenment and the advance of democracy as the preferred form of government in the West, was exhilarating to some. However, it proved extremely threatening to others, as it took away the security they felt under the older way of things. To many Germans of the time, and especially to the adherents of Nazism, the very cohesiveness of Western culture and civilization appeared to be in dire peril.

The modernist break occurred around the same time as the October Revolution of 1917 in Russia, and those who felt threatened by the new artistic viewpoint associated it with the group that came to power after that revolution, the Bolsheviks with their Marxist–Leninist political philosophy. In reality, the connection between the modernism and Bolshevism was extremely tenuous, and primarily a matter of both existing at the same turbulent time in European history. Still, some artists in Western Europe drew inspiration from revolutionary ideals, to the extent that Dadaist Richard Huelsenbeck confidently declared in 1920 that Dada was a "German Bolshevist affair".

One of the first writers outside of Germany to associate Bolshevism as an art movement, a link to what would become Cultural Marxism in the late 1990s, was Italian far-right author Julius Evola. Evola was a dadaist painter after the first World War, something which was considered decadent and subversive. In an article called Sui limiti del bolscevismo culturale, published in February 1938 in La Vita Italiana monthly magazine, he named the movement as "cultural Bolshevism" (bolscevismo culturale).

The association of new art with Bolshevism circulated in right-wing and nationalist discourse in the following years, being the subject of a chapter in Adolf Hitler's Mein Kampf. Amid Hitler's rise to power, the Nazis denounced a number of contemporary styles as "cultural Bolshevism," notably abstract art and Bauhaus architecture. After seeing a colleague beaten by Nazi supporters for comments sympathetic to modern art, typographer Paul Renner published an essay against Nazi aesthetics titled "Kulturbolschewismus?" Around the same time, Carl von Ossietzky mocked the flexibility of the term in Nazi writings:

Cultural Bolshevism is when conductor Klemperer takes tempi different from his colleague Furtwängler; when a painter sweeps a color into his sunset not seen in Lower Pomerania; when one favors birth control; when one builds a house with a flat roof; when a Caesarean birth is shown on the screen; when one admires the performance of Chaplin and the mathematical wizardry of Einstein. This is called cultural Bolshevism and a personal favor rendered to Herr Stalin. It is also the democratic mentality of the brothers [Heinrich and Thomas] Mann, a piece of music by Hindemith or Weill, and is to be identified with the hysterical insistence of a madman for a law giving him permission to marry his own grandmother.

Once in control of the government, the Nazis moved to suppress modern art styles and to promote art with national and racial themes. Various Weimar-era art personalities, including Renner, Huelsenbeck, and the Bauhaus designers, were marginalized.

== See also ==
- Art in Nazi Germany
- Cultural Marxism conspiracy theory
- Degenerate art
- Degeneration theory
- Degenerate music
- Deutsche Physik
- Jewish Bolshevism
- Music in Nazi Germany
- Negermusik
- Reichsmusikkammer
- Sexual Bolshevism
- Weimar culture
