= Reich Music Examination Office =

Music censorship office operated within Nazi Germany

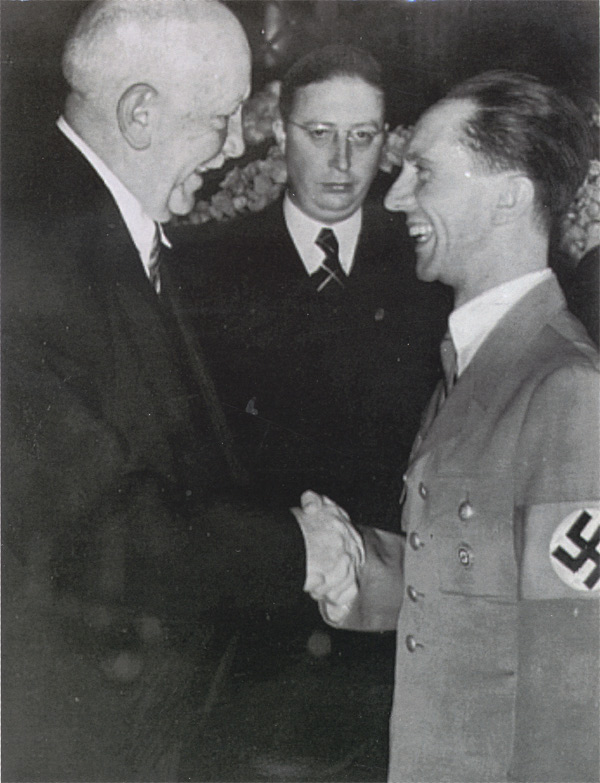
Heinz Drewes between Richard Strauss (left) and Joseph Goebbels in 1938

The Reich Music Examination Office (German: Reichsmusikprüfstelle) was an organisation within the Reich Ministry for Popular Enlightenment and Propaganda whose role was to prevent the distribution of 'undesirable' music within Nazi Germany. In doing so, it worked in conjunction with the Music Chamber of the Reich Chamber of Culture.

== Degenerate music ==
The Office was established as a result of an 'Order Concerning Undesirable and Dangerous Music', issued by the Music Chamber in December 1937. Heinz Drewes became the Office's first director. Initially, the Office's remit was to screen all foreign music before publication or distribution, but in March 1939, this role expanded to encompass all music. As this task was too great for one bureau to deal with, publishers were only under compulsion to submit music to the Office if it was requested, although some composers submitted their own compositions anyway.

As part of its work, the Reich Music Examination Office published lists of 'undesirable' compositions, the first of which was produced on 31 August 1938 and published in the Music Chamber's official journal on 1 September. Five more of these lists were published (containing in total 83 titles or composers' names). This small number indicates that the mere existence of the office had a self-regulatory effect. Much of the banned material comprised what the Nazis called degenerate music, such as jazz or negermusik as well as the compositions of Jewish composers like Mahler.

== See also ==
- Music in Nazi Germany
- Reich Chamber of Music
