= Paul Graener =

German composer and conductor

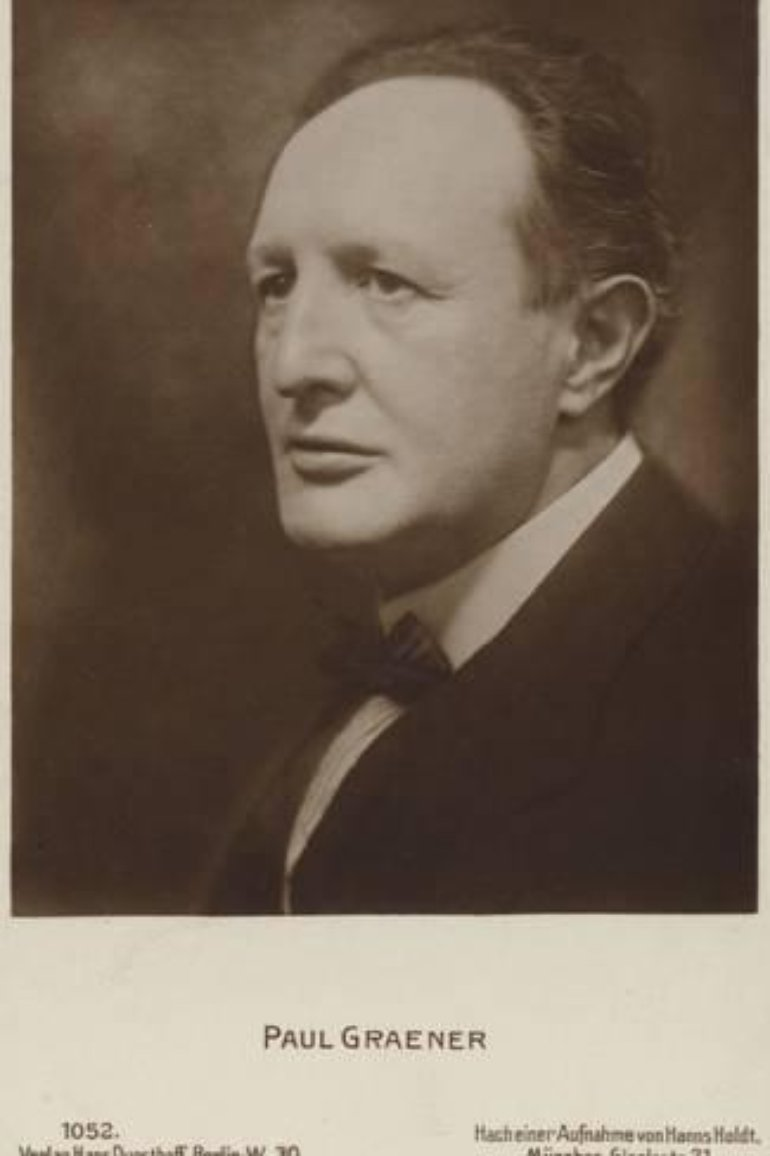
Paul Graener

Paul Graener (11 January 1872 – 13 November 1944) was a German composer and conductor. He composed numerous operas and orchestral works in the style of late Romanticism.

== Biography ==
Graener was born in Berlin and orphaned as a young child. A boy soprano, he taught himself composition and in 1896 moved to London, where he gave private lessons and served briefly as conductor at the Haymarket Theatre. Before the move, he had married Maria Elisabeth Hauschild, who bore him three children in London. Graener is recorded in the United Kingdom Census of 1901 as a "musical director (theatre)" living at 3 Poplar Grove in Hammersmith together with Maria (born in Kiel), their first two children (Heinz and Paul, aged 4 and 2) and Graener's author cousin, George.

In around 1910, Graener moved to Vienna, where he took up a teaching post at the Neues Wiener Konservatorium. He moved several times in the 1910s, living in Salzburg, Dresden and Munich, eventually accepting the position of professor of composition at the Leipzig University of Music and Theatre which had previously been held by Max Reger. In 1925, he left in order to focus on composition.

Returning to Berlin in 1930, he directed the Stern'sches Konservatorium and, from 1935 to 1941, served as vice-president of the Reichsmusikkammer. This position, previously held by Wilhelm Furtwängler, was a major governmental post within an arm of the Nazi Propaganda Ministry, although the extent to which Graener sympathized with Nazi ideals is a subject of debate - however, Erik Levi states in Graener's entry in the New Grove Dictionary of Music and Musicians (ç. 1988) that he continued to support the regime until he died. In the late 1920s, Graener had joined the Militant League for German Culture, and on 1 April 1933 he became a member of the Nazi Party. During World War II, his Berlin apartment was bombed and he moved with his family to, successively, Wiesbaden, Munich, Vienna and Salzburg, where he died aged 72 in 1944.

Stylistically, Graener was heavily indebted to the late Romanticism of Richard Strauss and Max Reger.

== Works ==
=== Operas ===
- The Faithful Sentry, Op. 1 (premiered 1899)
- Das Narrengericht, Op. 38 (1913)
- Don Juans letztes Abenteuer, Op. 42 (1914)
- Theophano, Op. 48 (premiered 1918, Munich)
- Schirin und Gertraude, Op. 51 (1920)
- Hanneles Himmelfahrt, W/o Op. (1927) (after Gerhart Hauptmann's play)
- Friedemann Bach, Op. 90 (1931) (after Albert Emil Brachvogel's novel)
- Der Prinz von Homburg, Op. 100 (1935)
- Schwanhild (1941, premiered January 4, 1942, Cologne)

=== Orchestral ===
- 2 Stücke, Op. 9
- 3 Stücke, Op. 26
- Sinfonietta for Strings and Harp, Op. 27 (1910)
- Symphony in D Minor Schmied Schmerz (1912, Op. 39)
- Aus dem Reiche des Pan, Op. 22 (1920)
- Romantische Phantasie, Op. 41
- Musik am Abend, Op. 44
- Variationen über ein russisches Volkslied, Op. 55 (from 1926)
- Waldmusik, Op. 60
- Divertimento in D major, Op. 67
- Piano Concerto, Op. 72
- Juventus academica (overture), Op. 73
- Gotische Suite, Op. 74
- Concerto for Cello and Chamber Orchestra, Op. 78 (published in 1927)
- Die Flöte von Sanssouci, Op. 88 (1930)
- Comedietta, Op. 82
- Variationen über Prinz Eugen, Op. 108 (1939)
- Sinfonia breve, Op. 96
- 3 schwedische Tänze, Op. 98
- Violin Concerto, Op. 104
- Feierliche Stunde, Op. 106
- Turmwächterlied, Op. 107 (1938)
- Wiener Sinfonie, Op. 110 (1941, First Performance: Hans Knappertsbusch, Berlin Philharmonic)
- Flute Concerto, Op. 116

=== Chamber music ===
- 4 String Quartets (incl. Opp. 54, 65 and 80 published 1920-8)
- Suite, Op. 63 for flute and piano (published in 1924)

=== Other ===
- ca. 130 songs
