= Negermusik =

Defamatory term for blues and jazz

Poster of a 1938 exhibit in Düsseldorf, "Degenerate Music"

Negermusik (transl. negro music) was a derogatory term used by the Nazi Party during the Third Reich to demonize musical styles invented by black people such as blues and jazz. The Nazi Party prohibited these styled as degenerate works created by an "inferior" race. The term was also applied to indigenous music styles of black Africans.

== Nazi Germany ==
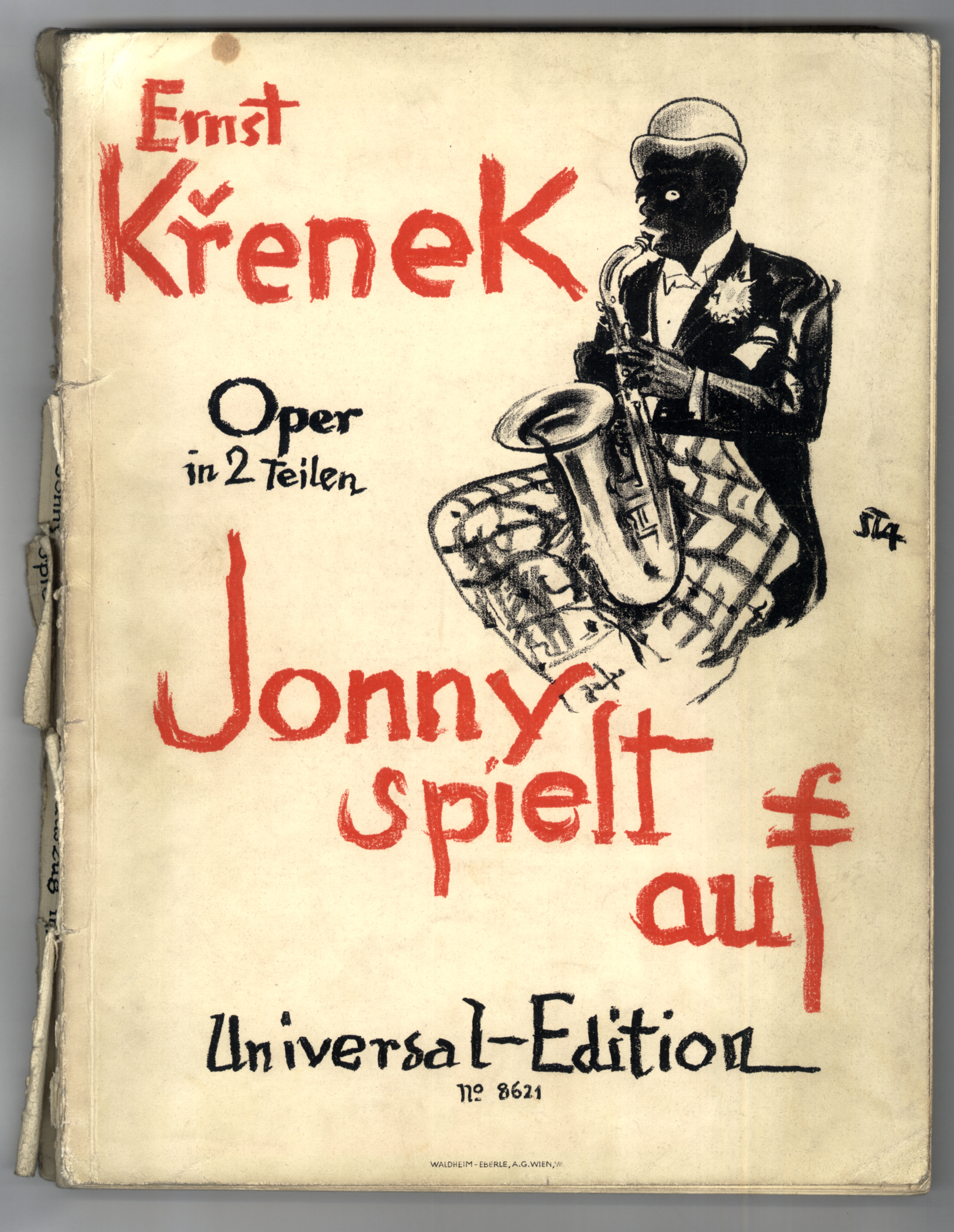
Poster of Jonny spielt auf

At the time of the Weimar Republic during 1927, Ernst Krenek's opera of Jonny spielt auf (Jonny Plays) contained jazz musical performances that caused protests among some right-wing ethnic-nationalist groups in Germany at the time. In 1930, the American musician Henry Cowell wrote in the Melos journal that jazz interpreted a mixture of African-American and Jewish elements, stating that:

The fundamentals of jazz are the syncopation and rhythmic accents of the Negro. Their modernization is the work of New York Jews ... So jazz is Negro music seen through the eyes of the Jews.

Such views were readily picked up by the Nazis. Their criticisms have included "gratuitous use of syncopation" and "orgies of drums". More statements from the Nazis included such things as "artistic licentiousness" and "corruption seed in the musical expression" with "indecent dance forms". They went on to scrutinize all modern music of the 1930s as a "political weapon of the Jews". On 4 May 1930, Wilhelm Frick, the Reich's newly appointed Minister of the Interior and Education for Thuringia made a decree called "Against the Negro Culture – For Our German Heritage".

In 1932 the national government under Franz von Papen pandered to the Nazis by banning all public performances by black musicians. After Adolf Hitler gained power in 1933, the Reich's Music Chamber was also created in that same year. This was then followed by a full legal ban on this music on October 12, 1935, across all German national radio. This ban was spearheaded by the German Reich's radio conductor, Eugen Hadamovsky, who purportedly stated: "As of today, I decree a definitive ban on the negro jazz for the entire German Radio." (Note: Mit dem heutigen Tag spreche ich ein endgültiges Verbot des Negerjazz für den gesamten Deutschen Rundfunk aus.)

In 1938, the Nazis organized the Entartete Musik (Degenerate music) public exhibition in Germany, mainly held in Düsseldorf. This exhibition included a poster displaying a cartoon caricature of an African-American male playing on a saxophone with the Star of David on his tuxedo lapel. The overall theme of the exhibition was defamation of contemporary American music as "Negro music" and as another Jewish 'plot' upon German culture.

== Swing Kids ==
The "Swing Kids" (German: Swingjugend) were a group of jazz and swing lovers in Germany in the 1930s, mainly in Hamburg (St. Pauli) and Berlin. They were mainly composed of 14- to 18-year-old boys and girls. They defied the Nazis by listening and dancing to this same banned music in private quarters, clubs, rented halls and vacant cafés. German jazz was offensive to Nazi ideology, because it was often performed by blacks and a number of Jewish musicians. The Swing Kids gave the impression of being apolitical, similar to their zoot suiter counterparts in North America.

On 18 August 1941, in a brutal police operation, over 300 Swing Kids were arrested. The measures against them ranged from cutting their hair and sending them back to school under close monitoring, to the deportation of their leaders to Nazi concentration camps.

The 1993 movie Swing Kids gives a fictional portrayal of these same youths in that period in Germany.

== World War II ==
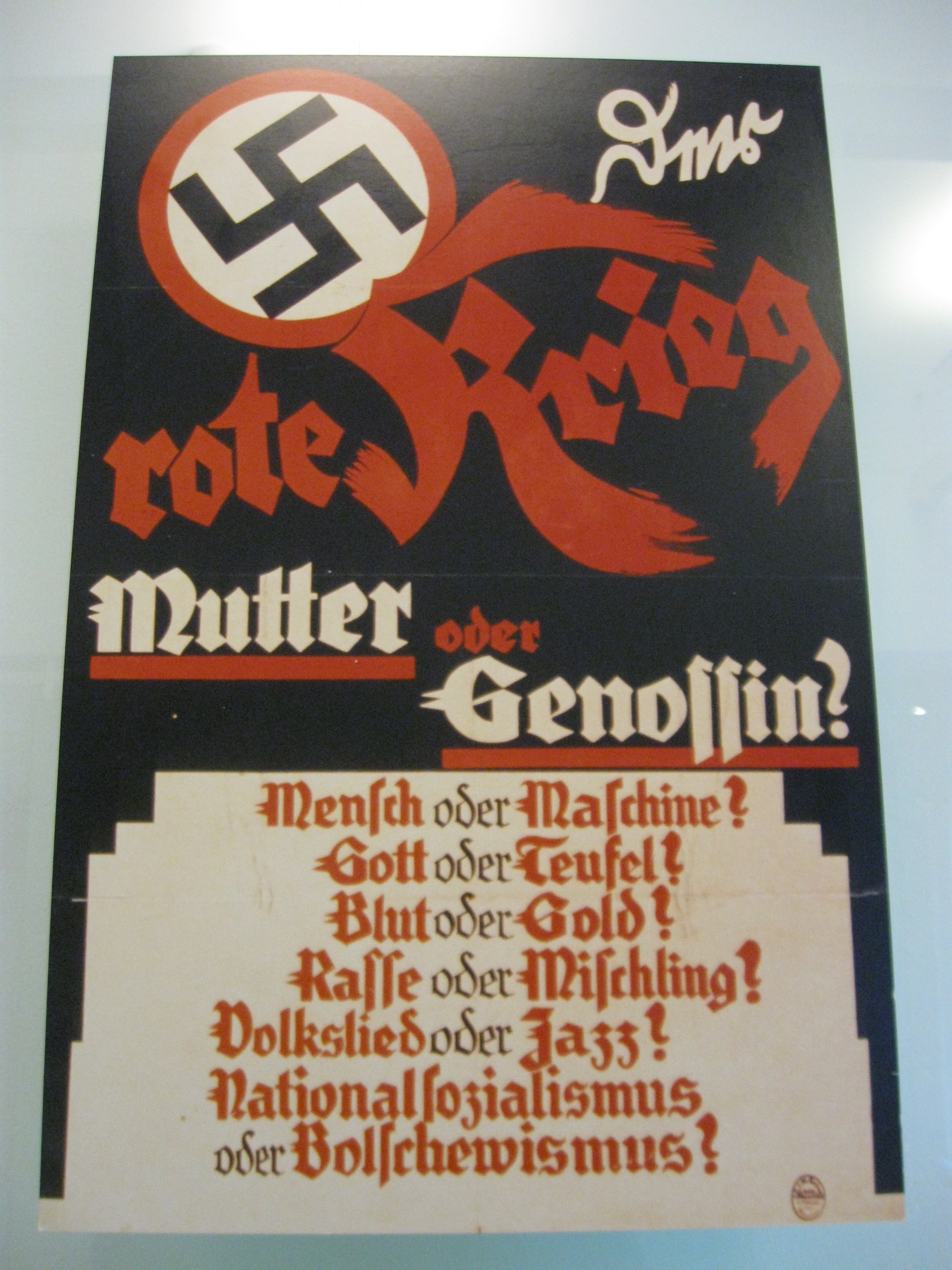
Nazi propaganda poster about the "Red War". Among the questions posed are "Volkslied or Jazz?"

Prior to the D-Day landings, during the German occupation of the Netherlands, Joseph Goebbels's propaganda ministry published pamphlets written in Dutch named "Greetings from England – The Coming Invasion". These pamphlets contained in-between statements, such as "old jazz-records" and a further full statement declaring "at the celebration of liberation your daughters and wives will be dancing in the arms of real Negroes". This further equated jazz music with 'blackness' during this time to stir up racism and anti-Allied propaganda within occupied Europe. However, Goebbels managed to create a Nazi-sponsored German swing band named Charlie and his Orchestra whose propagandistic purpose was to win over Nazi support and sympathy from British and American listeners through shortwave radio.

Additionally counter-propaganda was used by Allied forces which played upon the fears of the Nazi's banned music. One such example is Glenn Miller, who was a White American jazz musician, that initially provided jazz music, through radio, to Allied combat soldiers for the purposes of entertainment and morale. His same music was used as counter-propaganda by AFN radio broadcasting to denounce fascist oppression in Europe with even Miller once stating himself: "America means freedom, and there's no expression of freedom quite so sincere as music."

== Post-War period ==
Even in the post-World War II years in 1950s Germany, there were some protests from churches, school authorities and politicians against the "obscene Negro music" of the newly emerging rock 'n' roll genre with such acts like Elvis and Chuck Berry gaining new popularity amongst youth. This attitude continued as far along as the 1960s, carrying the same derogatory term—a phrase that represented the resentment held by older generations and conservatives toward earlier-targeted jazz, but also was an aggressive defense against a then new contemporary American culture.

== See also ==
- Degenerate music
- Low culture
- Music in Nazi Germany
- Nazism and race
- Persecution of black people in Nazi Germany
- Racial policy of Nazi Germany
- Rhineland Bastard
