= Mann brothers =

The Mann brothers refers to the German writers Heinrich Mann (1871–1950) and Thomas Mann (1875–1955). Both went to the United States after Adolf Hitler and the Nazi Party came to power in Germany. A third brother, Viktor, did not have a high public profile.

== See also ==
- Mann family
