= Jonny spielt auf =

Opera by Ernst Křenek

- Opera by Ernst Krenek
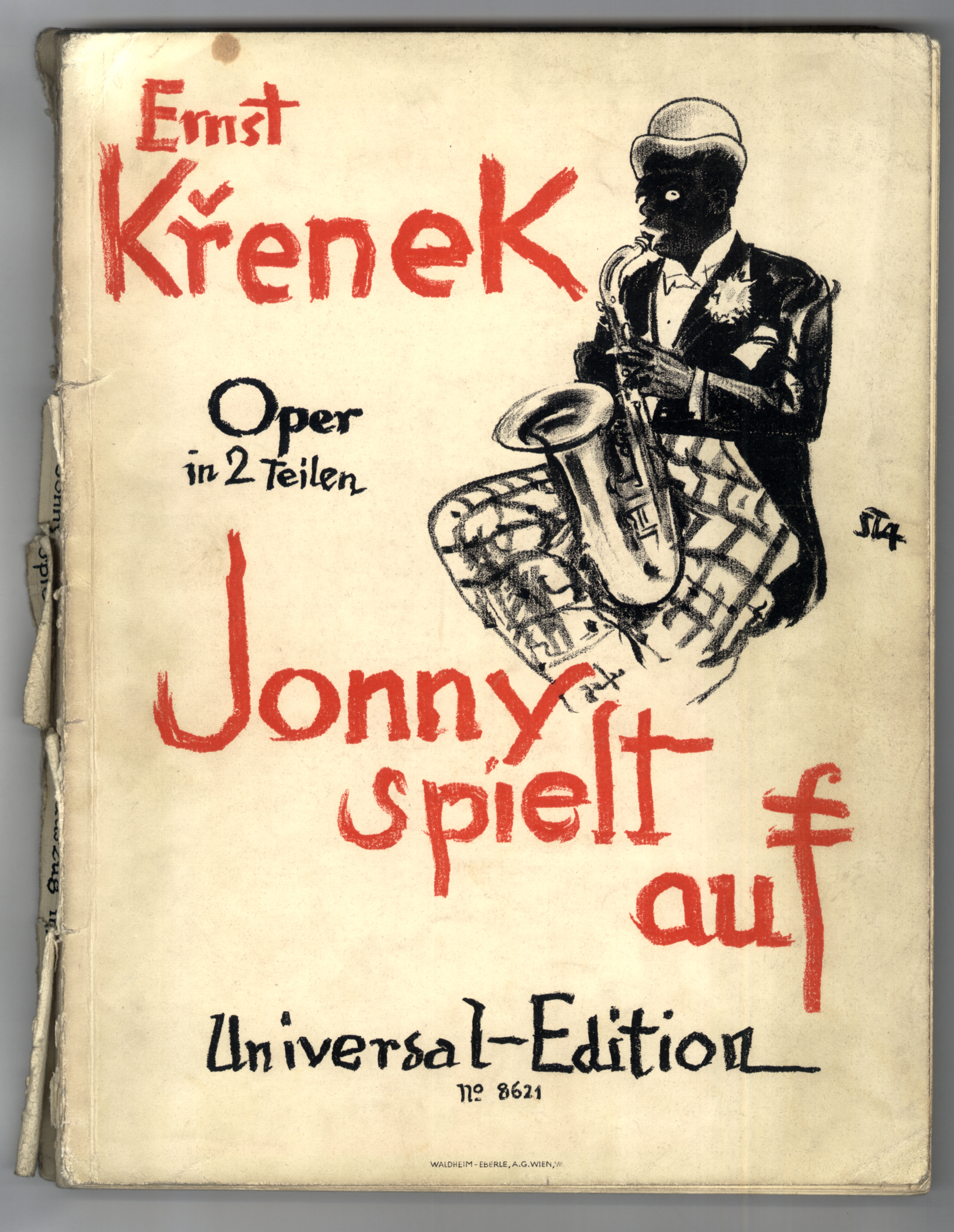
- Title page of the 1926 vocal score (1st edition)
- Translation: Jonny Strikes Up
- Librettist: Krenek
- Language: German
- Premiere: 10 February 1927; Neues Theater (Leipzig)

Jonny spielt auf (Jonny Strikes Up), Op. 45, is a German-language Zeitoper with words and music by Austrian composer Ernst Krenek about a jazz violinist. He dedicated the opera to his second wife, Berta Herrmann. A performance lasts about two hours. The work typified the cultural freedom of the 'golden era' of the Weimar Republic.

== Performance history ==
Walther Brügmann directed the premiere at the Neues Theater (Leipzig), the predecessor to the Leipzig Opera, on 10 February 1927. The work was quickly adopted by opera houses across Germany, where it was performed 421 times on various stages during its first season alone. It provided Krenek with the financial security to be able to devote all his time to composing. The arietta from act 1, "Leb' wohl, mein Schatz", was as an arrangement for jazz band or salon orchestra released as "Jonny’s Blues" on several 78 rpm recordings. It was staged in 42 opera houses, including at the Metropolitan Opera in New York City on 19 January 1929 where it was given under Artur Bodanzky with Florence Easton, Edytha Fleischer, Walter Kirchhoff, Michael Bohnen and Friedrich Schorr. The libretto was translated into 14 languages. It was the first opera performed by Swiss tenor Hugues Cuénod.

Nevertheless, with the rise of the Nazi movement, the opera encountered hostility in Vienna in 1927–1928 from Nazi sympathisers. The magazine Vogue described the scene in spring of 1928:

In Munich, for instance, the opera-house was closed to it, and, to be presented at all, it had to go to the Gaertner Platz Theater. At the first performance, angry witnesses threw evil-smelling devices. At the second, ironic partisans of Hitler unloosed a cageful of white mice. After the show, crowds in the street outside threatened the audience for having willingly looked upon the "Black Shame!"

The same protests occurred several years later in Munich. After the National Socialists attained power in Germany, they banned the opera. At the 1938 Entartete Musik exhibition in Düsseldorf, organiser Hans Severus Ziegler condemned the opera as the very archetype of Weimar decadence and used a racist and antisemitic caricature of one of the original promotional posters for the work from 1927 as the main promotional image for his exhibition.

== Roles ==
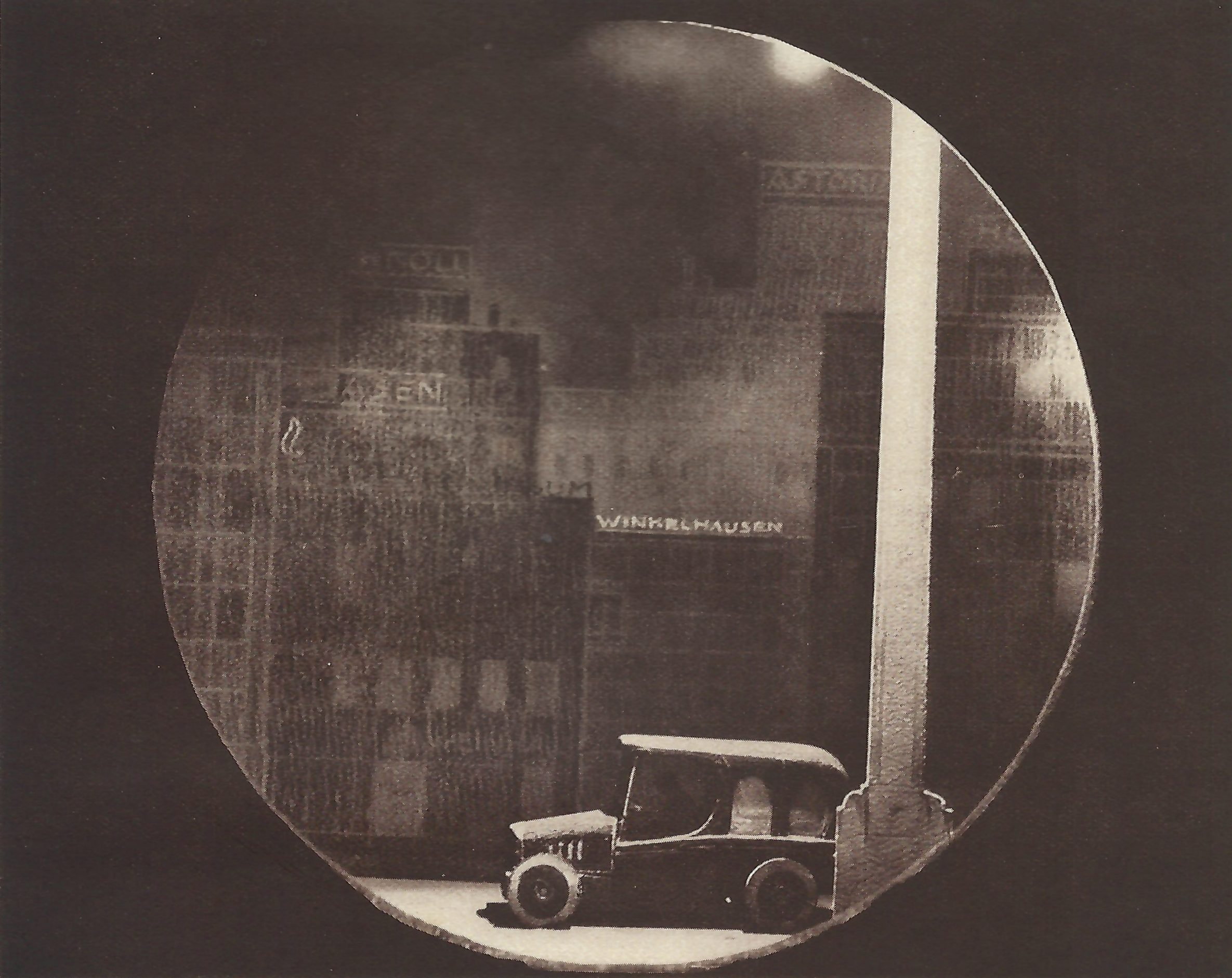
Scene design by Walther Brügmann (1927)

Roles, voice types, premiere cast
Role	Voice type	Premiere cast, 10 February 1927 Conductor: Gustav Brecher
Anita, an opera singer	soprano	Fanny Cleve
Max, a composer	tenor	Paul Beinert
Daniello, a virtuoso violinist	baritone	Theodor Horand
Jonny, a black jazz band fiddler	baritone	Max Spilcker
Yvonne, a hotel chambermaid	soprano	Claire Schulthess
Hotel director	tenor	
Railway employee	tenor	
Artists' manager	tenor	
Three policemen	tenor / baritone / bass	

== Synopsis ==
=== Part 1 ===
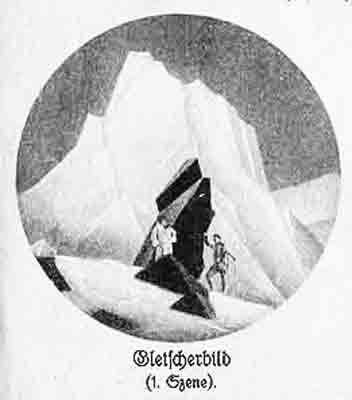
Scene 1, glacier (1927 Dresden premiere)

The opera singer Anita is walking in the mountains. Lost, she meets the composer Max, who is admiring a glacier. She recognizes Max and tells him that she sang the title role in one of his operas. Both return together to the mountain hotel. A few days later, and it is clear Max has fallen in love with Anita, but she has to leave for Paris where she is performing in his new opera.

As jazz plays in the foyer of a Paris hotel, a chambermaid, Yvonne, who is in a relationship with the jazz fiddler Jonny, is cleaning the room of the famous Daniello – a concert violinist. Jonny slips into the room, sees Daniello's Amati violin and decides to steal it but is prevented from doing so by Anita's arrival. Wasting no time. Jonny makes a none-too-subtle pass at Anita and they are in an embrace when Daniello shows up. Daniello pulls Jonny off Anita, locks up the valuable violin, and takes Anita to his bedroom. Jonny observes this and, with the help of key he has obtained from Yvonne, steals the violin and hides it in Anita's banjo case.

The next morning Anita leaves Daniello's room to meet with her manager and sign a contract that will take her over to America to sing there. Daniello then discovers his violin is missing, realizes someone has to have had access to his room and summons the hotel manager who sacks Yvonne. Daniello thinks Anita is in some ways involved and decides to take revenge by embarrassing her. He gives Yvonne a ring Anita has just given to him, telling Yvonne to show it to Max and tell him about his and Anita's affair, then he follows Anita. Jonny is also in pursuit of Anita because she has with her the banjo case containing the priceless violin.

=== Part 2 ===
Back in Anita's house in the Alps, Max is asleep, having stayed up all night waiting for Anita. When Anita finally arrives she is hardly affectionate, puts the banjo case on the piano and heads to bed. Shortly after, Yvonne arrives, tells Max about Anita's love life in Paris and shows him the ring. Max storms out to seek solace and calm by beside the glacier.

Meanwhile, Jonny shows up. Yvonne thinks he has come to make up with her while Jonny thinks Yvonne is trying to recover the violin to return it to Daniello. Opening the banjo case and grabbing the violin, Jonny escapes through the window. Now we find Max beside the glacier and contemplating throwing himself into one of its deep crevices but the glacier speaks to Max, advising Max against suicide.

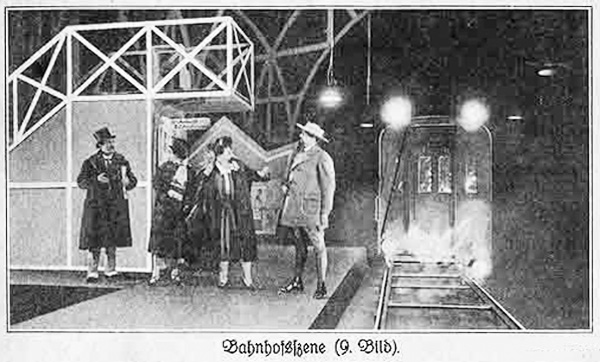
Scene 9, railway station (1927 Dresden premiere)

The sound of Anita's voice, singing one of Max's arias on the radio and broadcast via a hotel loudspeaker floats up to Max and he realizes he must return to Anita. The radio station plays another track, this time of Jonny's jazz band and Daniello, who is also listening to the broadcast while staying in another hotel recognizes the sound of his Amati violin. Realizes who the thief was, Daniello sends a telegram to alert the police. Three policemen pursue Jonny who is trying to flee to America with the violin. One of the policemen finds a railway ticket dropped by Jonny. Max has by chance come to the same railway station and Jonny, observing Max's luggage being deposited on the platform, slips the violin (now in Jonny's battered violin case) among Max's suitcases. The policemen see the violin case, seize it and arrest Max. Anita, who had been summoned by telegram to the station so Max could say goodbye to her face-to-face, arrives but Yvonne and Daniello are also there, and when Daniello tells Anita that Max has been arrested, Anita demands that Yvonne explain to Daniello Max's innocence. In the ensuing confusion Yvonne accidentally pushes Daniello off the platform and he is killed by an incoming train.

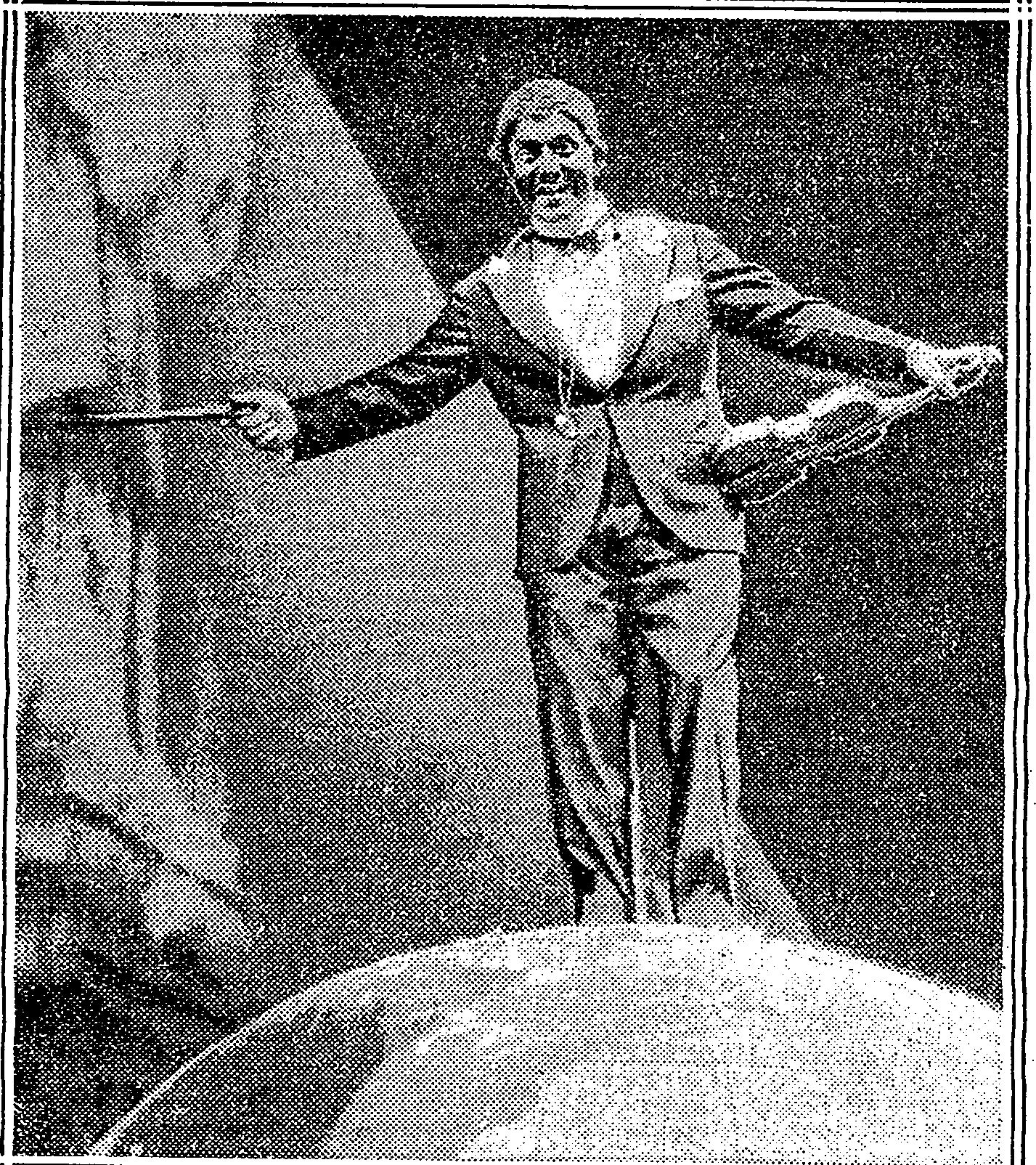
Michael Bohnen as Jonny in the American premiere of Jonny Spielt Auf

Jonny meanwhile knocks out the sleeping driver of the police van, taking his place behind the wheel while Max and the violin case are placed inside the van, and another policemen sits in the passenger seat. The van speeds off but Yvonne has managed to persuade Jonny to help Max so when max asks the driver turn around Jonny pushes the other policemen out of the van, turns the van around and heads back to the station. The train with Anita on board is pulling out of the station when Max jumps into her compartment and Jonny, violin in one hand, can be seen climbing onto the hands of the giant station clock high above the platform. When Jonny starts to play, all the passengers start to dance, then magically transferred to the North Pole, Jonny leads the whole world in dancing ... and all the other characters in the opera urge the audience to join in, too.

== Recordings ==
- Decca 436 631-2: Alessandra Marc, Krister St. Hill, Michael Kraus, Maria Posselt, Andreas Korn, Gunar Kaltofen, Roald Reinecke, Dieter Scholz; Leipzig Gewandhaus Orchestra; Lothar Zagrosek, conductor
- Vanguard Classics: Lucia Popp, Gerd Feldhoff, Thomas Stewart, Leo Heppe, Evelyn Lear; Vienna State Opera Orchestra; Heinrich Hollreiser, conductor
