= Degenerate music =

Nazi Germany label for certain music genres

Poster of a 1938 exhibition in Düsseldorf

Degenerate music (German: Entartete Musik, German pronunciation: [ɛntˈaʁtɛtə muˈziːk]) was a label applied in the 1930s by the government of Nazi Germany to certain forms of music that it considered harmful or decadent. The Nazi government's concerns about degenerate music were a part of its larger and better-known campaign against degenerate art (German: Entartete Kunst). In both cases, the government attempted to isolate, discredit, discourage, or ban the works.

== Racial emphasis ==
Jewish composers such as Felix Mendelssohn and Gustav Mahler were disparaged and condemned by the Nazis. In Leipzig, a bronze statue of Mendelssohn was removed. The regime commissioned music to replace his incidental music to A Midsummer Night's Dream.

The Nazis also regulated jazz, including the banning of solos and drum breaks, scat, "Negroid excesses in tempo" and "Jewishly gloomy lyrics".

== Discrimination ==
From the Nazi seizure of power onward, these composers found it increasingly difficult, and often impossible, to get work or have their music performed. Many went into exile (e.g., Arnold Schoenberg, Kurt Weill, Paul Hindemith, Berthold Goldschmidt); or retreated into "internal exile" (e.g., Karl Amadeus Hartmann, Boris Blacher); or ended up in the concentration camps (e.g., Viktor Ullmann, or Erwin Schulhoff).

Like degenerate art, examples of degenerate music were displayed in public exhibits in Germany beginning in 1938. One of the first of these was organized in Düsseldorf by Hans Severus Ziegler, at the time superintendent of the Deutsches Nationaltheater Weimar, who explained in an opening speech that the decay of music was "due to the influence of Judaism and capitalism".

Ziegler's exhibit was organized into seven sections, devoted to:

1. The influence of Judaism
2. Arnold Schoenberg
3. Kurt Weill and Ernst Krenek
4. Minor Bolsheviks (Franz Schreker, Alban Berg, Ernst Toch, etc.)
5. Leo Kestenberg, director of musical education before 1933
6. Hindemith's operas and oratorios
7. Igor Stravinsky

From the mid-1990s the Decca Record Company released a series of recordings under the title "Entartete Musik: Music Suppressed by the Third Reich", covering lesser-known works by several of the above-named composers.

== See also ==
- Cultural Bolshevism
- Low culture
- Music in Nazi Germany
- Musikwissenschaftliche Tagung 1938
- Negermusik
- Reich Music Examination Office
- Reichsmusikkammer
- Reichsmusiktage
- Swing Kids
