= Militant League for German Culture =

Nationalistic anti-Semitic political society during the Weimar Republic and the Nazi era

The Militant League for German Culture (German: Kampfbund für deutsche Kultur, KfdK), was a nationalistic antisemitic political society during the Weimar Republic and the Nazi era. It was founded in 1928 as the Nationalsozialistische Gesellschaft für deutsche Kultur (NGDK, National Socialist Society for German Culture) by Nazi ideologue Alfred Rosenberg and remained under his leadership until it was reorganized and renamed to the National Socialist Culture Community (Nationalsozialistische Kulturgemeinde) in 1934.

Its aim was to make a significant imprint on cultural life in Germany that was based on the aims and objectives of the inner circles of the Nazi Party. Upon its reorganization, it was merged with the Deutsche Bühne (German Stage), connected with the establishment of the official body for cultural surveillance, the "Dienstelle Rosenberg" (DRbg, Rosenberg Department), which was later known as the Amt Rosenberg (ARo, Rosenberg Office).

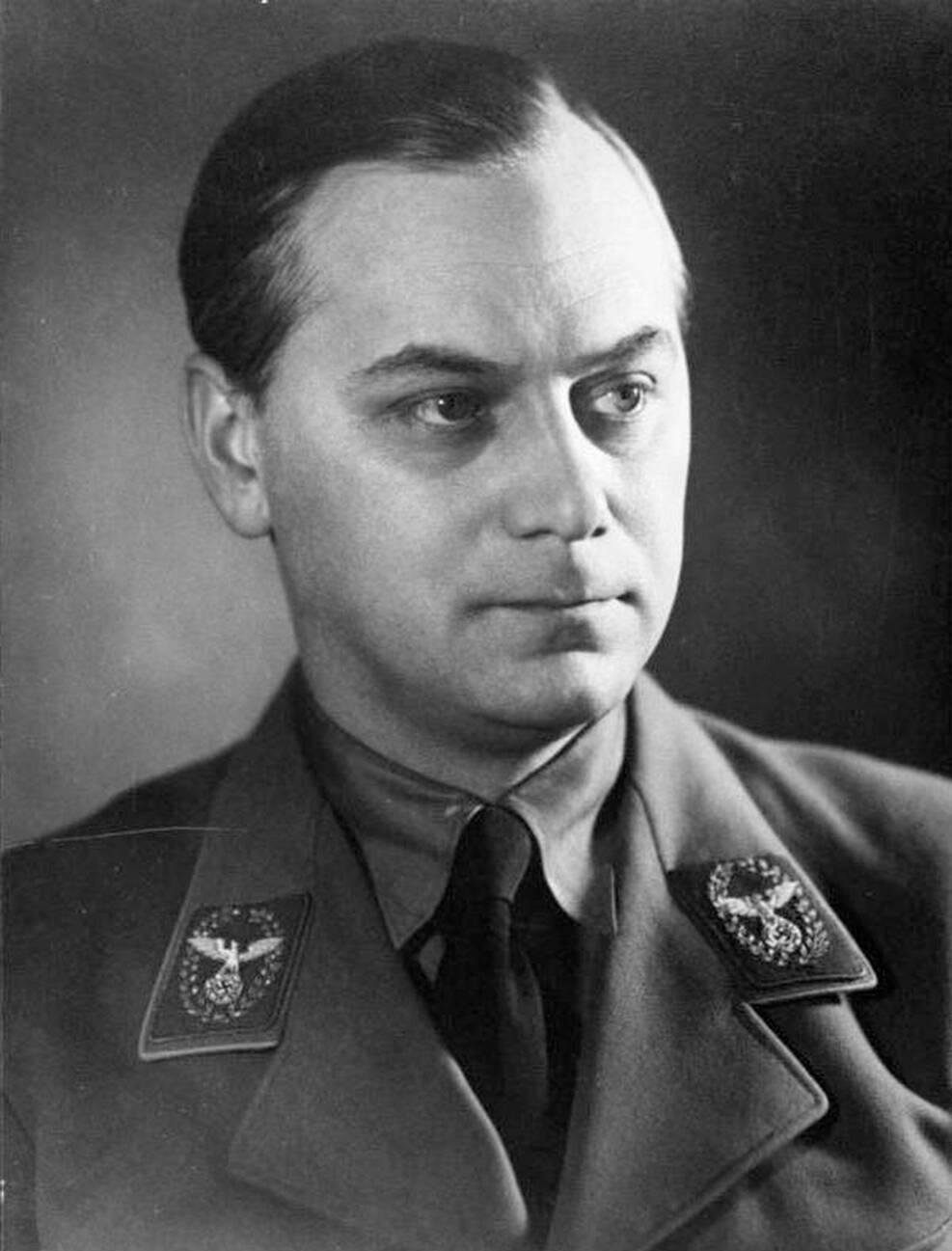
Alfred Rosenberg in 1939

== Members and followers ==
The number of members, who were organized in local chapters, rose from approximately 300 in 25 chapters in April 1929 to about 38,000 in 450 chapters by October 1933.

The members and supporters included representatives of the extreme right wing of the National Socialist movement. These included antisemitic literary historians Adolf Bartels, Ludwig Polland, Gustaf Kossinna, physicist and Albert Einstein-opponent Philipp Lenard, publishers Hugo Bruckmann and Julius Friedrich Lehmann, the leaders of the Bayreuth Society Winifred Wagner, Daniela Thode, Hans Freiherr von Wolzogen, the widow of racial ideologist Houston Stewart Chamberlain, Eva Chamberlain, the composer Paul Graener, the philosophers Otto Friedrich Bollnow, and Eugen Herrigel, the poet and later president of the Reichsschrifttumskammer Hanns Johst; the architect Paul Schulze-Naumburg, who edited the periodical Kunst und Rasse [Art and Race], and who spoke at many events; Gustav Havemann, a violinist and later leader of the Reichsmusikkammer (who founded and lead a Kampfbund orchestra); the theater director Karl von Schirach; Fritz Kloppe who led Werwolf, a paramilitary organization; and the theologian, nationalist musicologist Fritz Stein, actors Carl Auen and Aribert Mog, philosopher, sociologist and economist Othmar Spann, and Austrian political philosopher and a teacher of Friedrich Hayek. After an ad on April 20, 1933, Edwin Werner, PhD, founded his own association in Passau.

Corporate and organizational members included the Association of German Fraternities [Deutsche Burschenschaften], the German Homeland Association [Deutsche Landsmannschaft], German College Gymnastics Associations [Turnerschaften an deutschen Hochschulen], the Association of German Guilds [Deutsche Gildenschaften], the Association of German Glee Clubs [Deutsche Sängerschaft], the German College Music Society [Sondershäuser Verband], and German College Art Society [Deutscher Hochschulring].

== Publications and political action ==
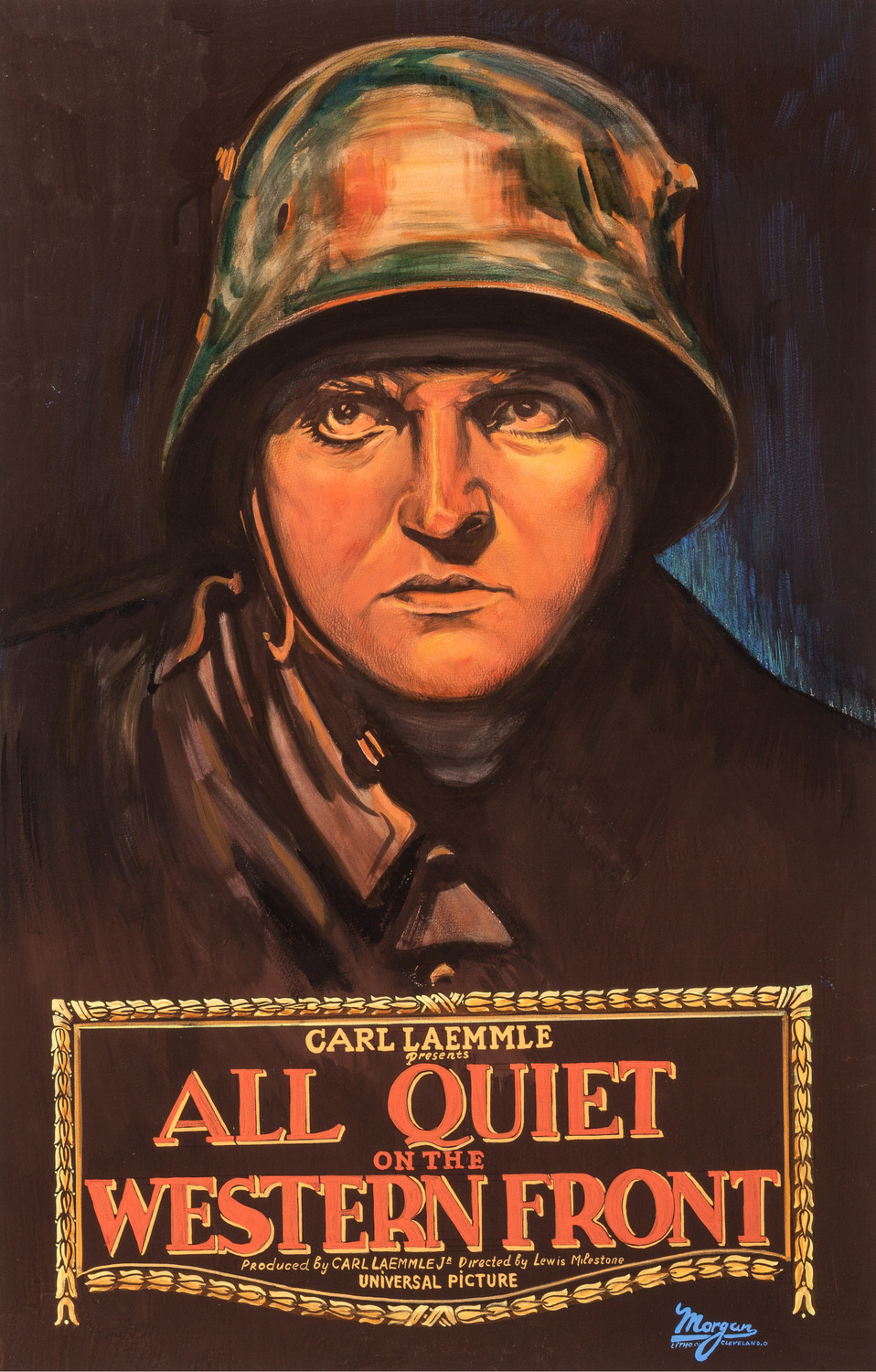
Film poster for All Quiet on the Western Front based on Erich Maria Remarque's book

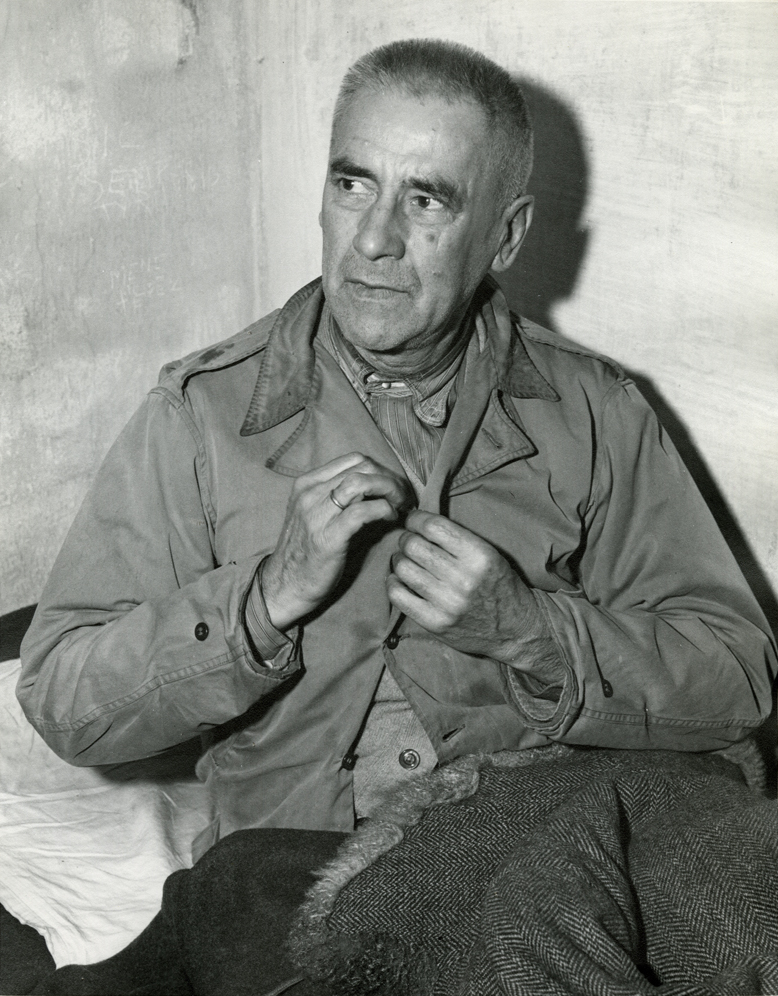
Frick in his cell, November 1945

The Society published the periodical Mitteilung des Kampfbundes für deutsche Kultur [Proceedings of the KfdK] from 1929 to 1931. Under the heading "Signs of the Times" they listed their enemies: Erich Kästner, Kurt Tucholsky, Thomas Mann, Bertolt Brecht, Walter Mehring, and the Berlin Institute for Sexual Research. Later the most frequently mentioned were Paul Klee, Kandinsky, Kurt Schwitters, the Bauhaus Movement, Emil Nolde, Karl Hofter, Max Beckmann, and Georg Grosz. Books by Ernst Toller, Arnold Zweig, Jakob Wassermann, Lion Feuchtwanger, Arnolt Bronnen, Leonhard Frank, Emil Ludwig, and Alfred Neumann were dismissed as not properly German. In 1930, the society directed a campaign against Ernst Barlach and the so-called "hate art" (Hetzkunst) of Käthe Kollwitz.

The Society published German Culture Watch: Journal of the KfdK in October 1932, reprinted in 1933, under the editorship of Hans Hinkel.

Their activities had a nationwide impact. In 1930 Wilhelm Frick, the Nazi Interior and Cultural minister of Thuringia and KdfK regional leader, named Hans Severus Ziegler of the Schultze-Naumburg firm as director of the Weimar Architecture Institute. He immediately dismissed all practitioners of the Bauhaus style. Frick ordered artworks by "degenerate artists" to be removed from the Schlossmuseum in Weimar. These included works by Otto Dix, Lyonel Feininger, Kandinsky, Paul Klee, Barlach, Oskar Kokoschka, Franz Marc, and Emil Nolde, although the latter was himself a Nazi. Works by modernist composers Stravinsky and Hindemith were struck from state-subsidized concert programs, and books by Erich Maria Remarque, and films by Eisenstein, Pudovkin, and Georg Wilhelm Pabst were banned outright.

The KfdK, under Frick's auspices, arranged its first major youth conference on Pentecost in 1930. It presented Nazi leaders Baldur von Schirach, Goebbels, Göring, and Darré. Referencing Weimar's "spiritual heroes" a resolution called for "strengthening German military will" and, in reference to the arts, "resistance against all populist harmful influences in the area of theater, literature and fine arts, and against alien architecture." The following Pentecost in 1931, saw a youth and cultural meeting in Potsdam, where Rosenberg gave lectures on "Blood and Honor," and "Race and Personality", and Göring on the theme "Readiness to fight to protect our culture."

== Bibliography ==
Background history

- Hildegard Brenner: Die Kunstpolitik des Nationalsozialismus. Reinbek bei Hamburg 1963, DNB.
- Klaus Vondung: Die Apokalypse in Deutschland. Munich 1988, ISBN 3-423-04488-8.
- Jan-Pieter Barbian: Literaturpolitik im »Dritten Reich«. Institutionen, Kompetenzen, Betätigungsfelder, Nördlingen 1995, ISBN 3-423-04668-6.
- Wolfram Meyer zu Uptrup: Kampf gegen die „jüdische Weltverschwörung“. Propaganda und Antisemitismus der Nationalsozialisten 1919–1945. Berlin 2003, ISBN 3-932482-83-2.

Primary sources and documents

- Alfred Rosenberg: Aufruf!. in: Der Weltkampf 5 (May 1928), pp. 210–212.
- Nationalsozialistische Propaganda in der Münchner Universität. In Frankfurter Zeitung, Evening Edition 25. February 1929, p. 2.
- Reichsleitung/Kampfbund für deutsche Kultur (ed.): Schwarze Liste für öffentliche Büchereien und gewerbliche Leihbüchereien. Berlin 1934, DNB

Research and monographs

- Reinhard Bollmus: Das Amt Rosenberg und seine Gegner. Studien zum Machtkampf im nationalsozialistischen Herrschaftssystem. Stuttgart 1970, DNB (2. Aufl., Munich / Oldenburg 2006, ISBN 3-486-54501-9.) (One chapter of quantitative data based closely on source material)
- Frank Wende (ed.): Lexikon zur Geschichte der Parteien in Europa. Kröner, Stuttgart 1981, ISBN 3-520-81001-8.
- Jürgen Gimmel: Die politische Organisation kulturellen Ressentiments. Der „Kampfbund für deutsche Kultur“ und das bildungsbürgerliche Unbehagen an der Moderne. Münster / Hamburg / London 1999, ISBN 3-8258-5418-3.
- Harald Lönnecker: „... Boden für die Idee Adolf Hitlers auf kulturellem Felde gewinnen“. Der „Kampfbund für deutsche Kultur“ und die deutsche Akademikerschaft. In: GDS-Archiv für Hochschul- und Studentengeschichte, Vol. 6, edited by Friedhelm Golücke / Peter Krause / Wolfgang Gottwald / Klaus Gerstein / Harald Lönnecker, Cologne 2002, pp. 121–144.

== See also ==
- Nordische Gesellschaft
