= Hans Severus Ziegler =

German publicist and Nazi Party official (1893–1978)

- Born: 13 October 1893; Eisenach, German Empire
- Died: 1 May 1978 (aged 84); Bayreuth, West Germany
- Occupations: publicist, teacher
- Organization: Nazi Party
- Known for: Head of the Militant League for German Culture
- Relatives: Gustav Schirmer (grandfather)

Hans Severus Ziegler (13 October 1893 – 1 May 1978) was a German publicist, theater manager, teacher and Nazi Party official. A leading cultural director under the Nazis, he was closely associated with the censorship and cultural co-ordination of the Third Reich.

== Early years ==
Ziegler was born on 13 October 1893 in Eisenach. He was the son of a banker and, through his mother, the grandson of Gustav Schirmer. His grandmother, the American-born Mary Francis Schirmer, was a close friend of Cosima Wagner and from an early age Ziegler was attracted to the militant nationalism in which the Wagner family were steeped. Ziegler studied German literature at university, completing his education with a PhD. He became a journalist, writing mostly for extreme right organs such as the Deutsche Wochen-Zeitung.

In 1924 Ziegler founded and edited a weekly political newspaper called Der Völkische. On 31 March 1925 Ziegler became a member of the Nazi Party, with his membership number being the comparatively low 1317. That year his newspaper expanded to a daily and changed its name to Der Nationalsozialist, becoming the Nazi Party organ of Thuringia. He served as Deputy Gauleiter in Thuringia under Artur Dinter from 1925 to 1927 and under Fritz Sauckel from 1927 to 1931. In 1928 he was appointed head of the Militant League for German Culture. It was also Ziegler who in 1926 came up with the name Hitler-Jugend (Hitler Youth) for the Nazi youth movement. Ziegler was a close friend of the Schirach family and in 1925 he introduced Baldur von Schirach, who would go on to lead the Hitler Youth, to Adolf Hitler.

Ziegler was associated with the hard-line racialist wing of the Nazi Party, which looked to Alfred Rosenberg as its champion. In keeping with this wing he was particularly staunch in his anti-Semitism.

== Under the Nazis ==
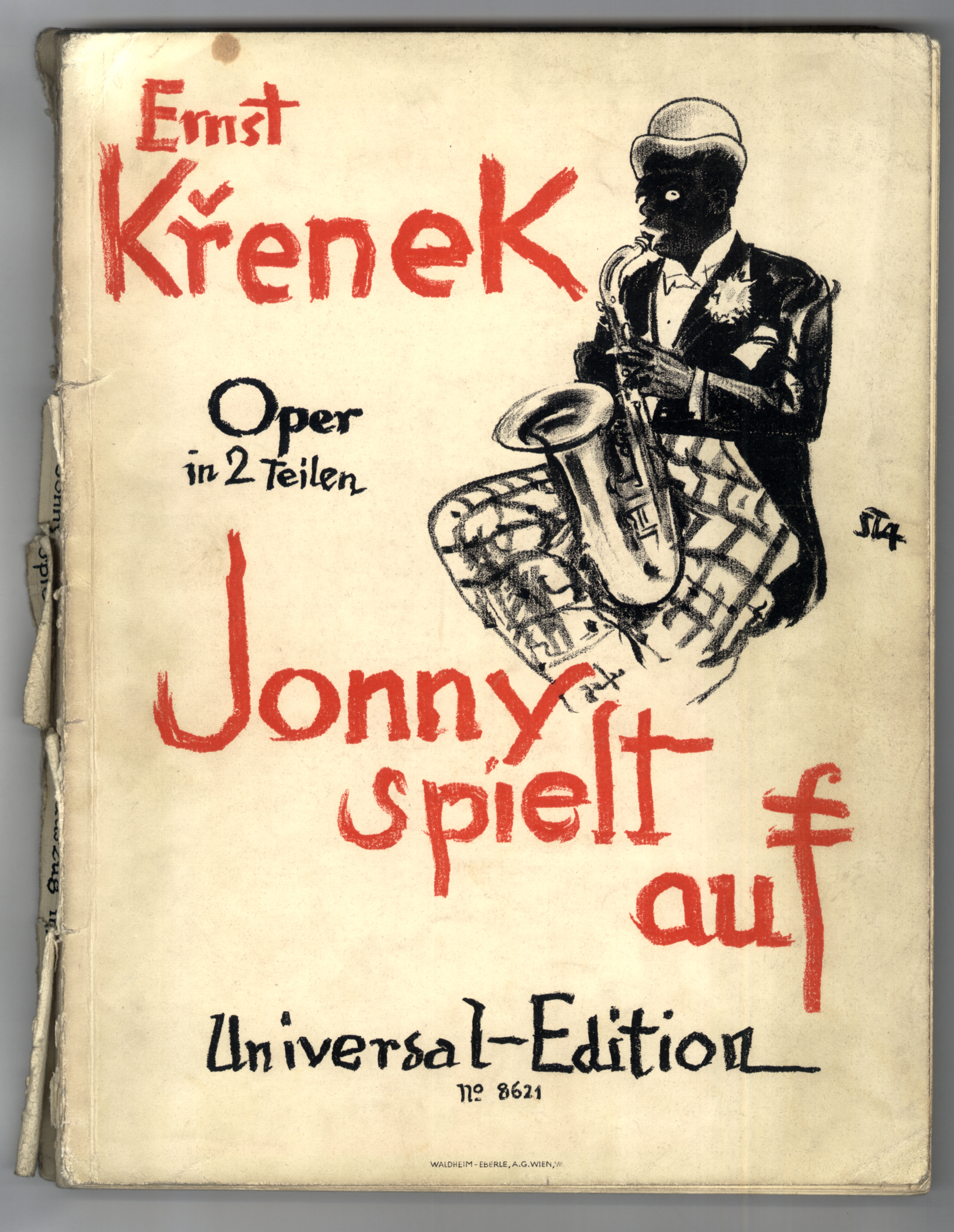
Jonny spielt auf, the title page of the 1926 vocal score (1st edition)

In 1933 Ziegler was appointed to the Council of State and as a member of the State Government of Thuringia. In addition, he served as President of the Deutsche Schillerstiftung and Reich culture Senator. In 1936, he was appointed the general manager of the Deutsches Nationaltheater and Staatskapelle Weimar and state commissioner for the State Theatre in Thuringia. In 1935 he was placed on leave whilst he was investigated for alleged breaches of Paragraph 175, the anti-homosexual legislation, although the case was dropped. He was long assumed to be homosexual during his lifetime.

Ziegler played a leading role in promoting the Nazi vision of culture, particularly with regards to "degenerate" music. He was a strong critic of atonality, dismissing it as decadent "cultural Bolshevism". In May 1938 he curated the Entartete Musik exhibition in Düsseldorf, with Arnold Schoenberg, Alban Berg, Walter Braunfels, Karol Rathaus and Wilhelm Grosz amongst those receiving the strongest condemnation in the pamphlet he wrote to accompany the exhibition. Whilst working under Frick, in Thuringia, Ziegler had also overseen the removal of modern art pieces from museums and public buildings, and helped to bring about a crackdown on the "glorification of Negroidism" by restricting the performance of jazz music. Promulgated in his 1930 edict Against Negro Culture, the Thuringian foreshadowed the co-ordination of culture that was to happen under the Nazi government. Entartete Musik would continue Ziegler's crusade against jazz, whilst also condemning Ernst Krenek's opera Jonny spielt auf as the archetype of Weimar decadence and miscegenation.

== After the war ==
In the Soviet occupation zone several of Ziegler's writings, as well as a book about him, were placed on the Liste der auszusondernden Literatur (list of banned literature).

After the war he worked as a representative for Gaststättenporzellan and subsequently as a private tutor in Essen. He also directed a private theatre from 1952 to 1954. Politically, he was active in Deutsches Kulturwerk Europäischen Geistes, an extreme right study group established in 1950. In this role, he became a regular guest of Winifred Wagner, who regularly hosted such other far-right luminaries as Adolf von Thadden, Edda Göring, and Oswald Mosley.

Ziegler died in Bayreuth on 1 May 1978.
