= Peter Raabe =

German conductor

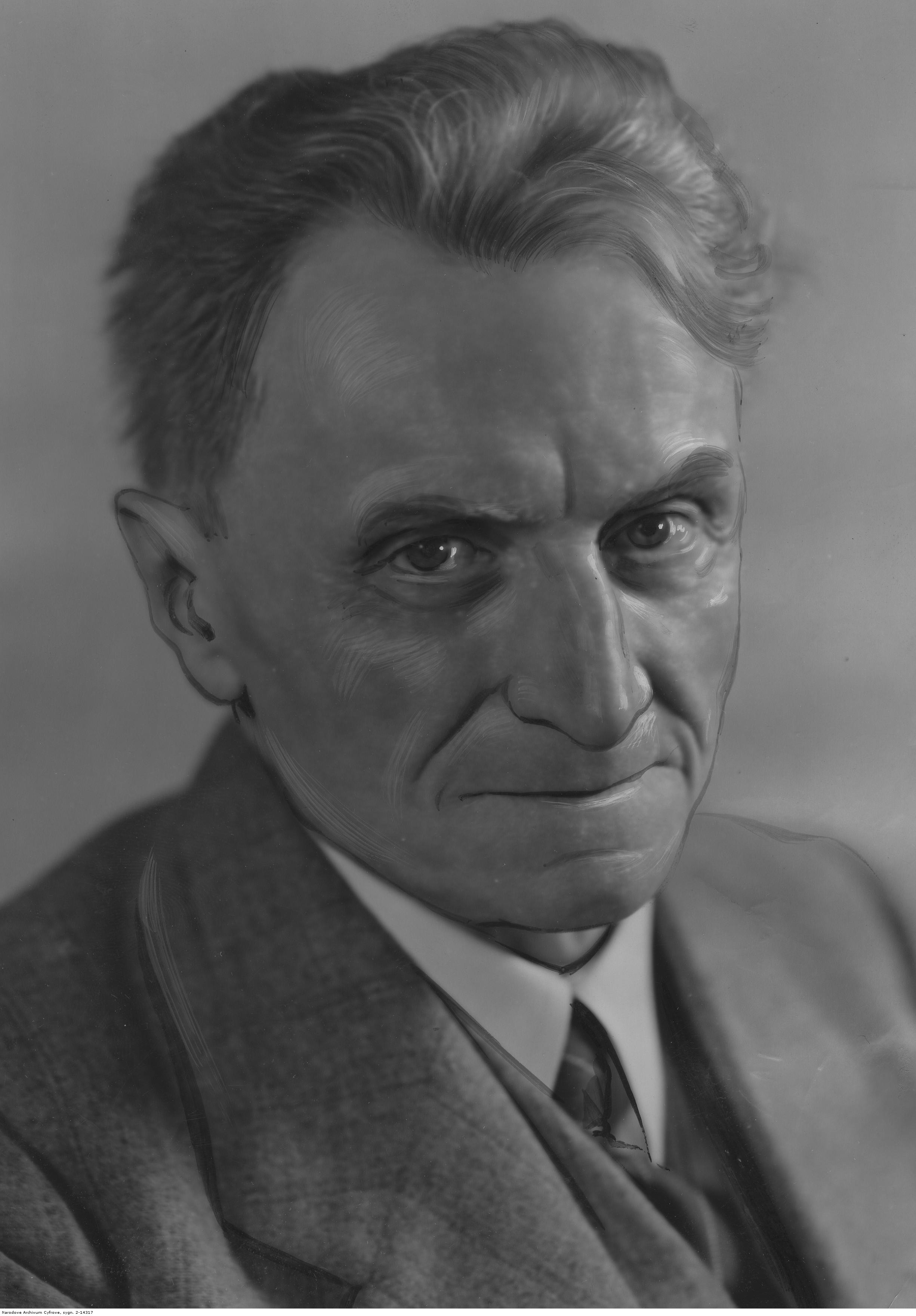

Background information
- Born: 27 November 1872; Frankfurt (Oder), German Empire
- Died: 12 April 1945 (aged 72) Weimar, Germany
- Genres: Classical

Peter Raabe (27 November 1872 – 12 April 1945) was a German composer and conductor.

== Biography ==
Raabe graduated from three schools: the Higher Musical School in Berlin, the Ludwig-Maximilians-Universität München, and the University of Jena. From 1894 to 1898, Raabe worked in Königsberg and Zwickau. From 1899 to 1903, he worked in the Dutch Opera-House (Amsterdam). From 1907 to 1920, Raabe was the 1st Court Conductor in Weimar. Raabe performed in the United Kingdom, Belgium, and the Netherlands, among other locations. On 19 July 1935 Raabe superseded Richard Strauss as the president of Reichsmusikkammer, the Nazi State Music Institute. For almost ten years, Raabe directed the music activity of the Third Reich.

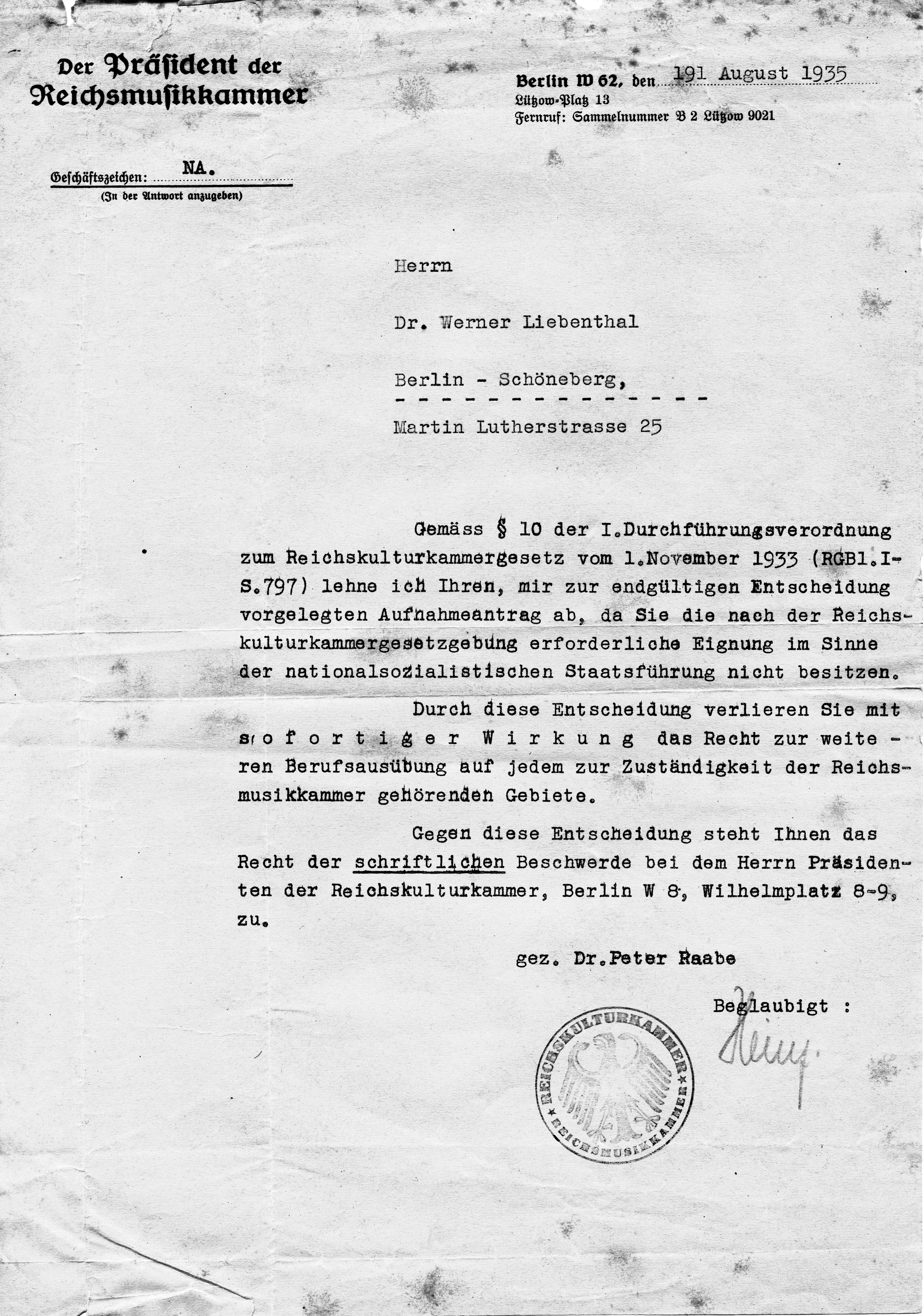
Reichsmusikkammer decree issued on 9 August 1935 by Dr. Peter Raabe, notifying the Berlin musician Dr. Werner Liebenthal of the immediate cessation of his professional activity.

Raabe wrote the first complete chronology of the works of Franz Liszt.

== General references ==
- Who Was Who in the Third Reich. Biographic encyclopedical dictionary, Moscow, 2003 (in Russian)
