= Reich Chamber of Music =

Music regulating company in Nazi Germany

- Reichsmusikkammer

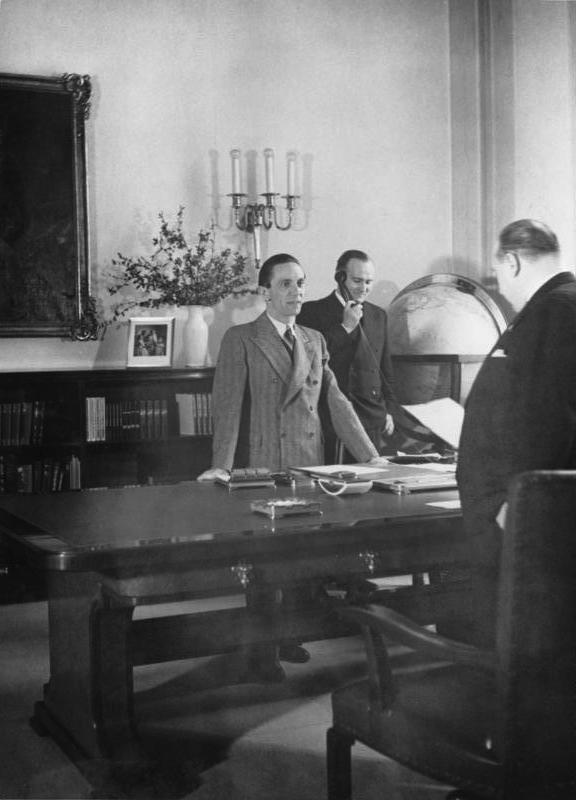
- Reich Minister Joseph Goebbels has a meeting with State Secretary Walther Funk in his office. In the background, Goebbels' assistant Karl Hanke takes a call.

Statutory corporation overview
- Formed: 1933
- Dissolved: 1945
- Jurisdiction: Nazi Germany
- Headquarters: Wilhelmplatz, Berlin
- Minister responsible: Joseph Goebbels, Reich Minister of Propaganda

The Reich Chamber of Music (German: Reichsmusikkammer; RMK) was a government agency which operated as a statutory corporation controlled by the Ministry of Public Enlightenment and Propaganda that regulated the music industry in Nazi Germany between 1933 and 1945. It promoted "good German music" which was composed by Aryans and seen as consistent with Nazi views, while suppressing other, "degenerate" music, which included atonal music, jazz, and, especially, music by Jewish composers. The Chamber was founded in 1933 by Joseph Goebbels as part of the Reich Chamber of Culture, and it operated until the fall of the Nazi Germany in 1945.

== Functions ==
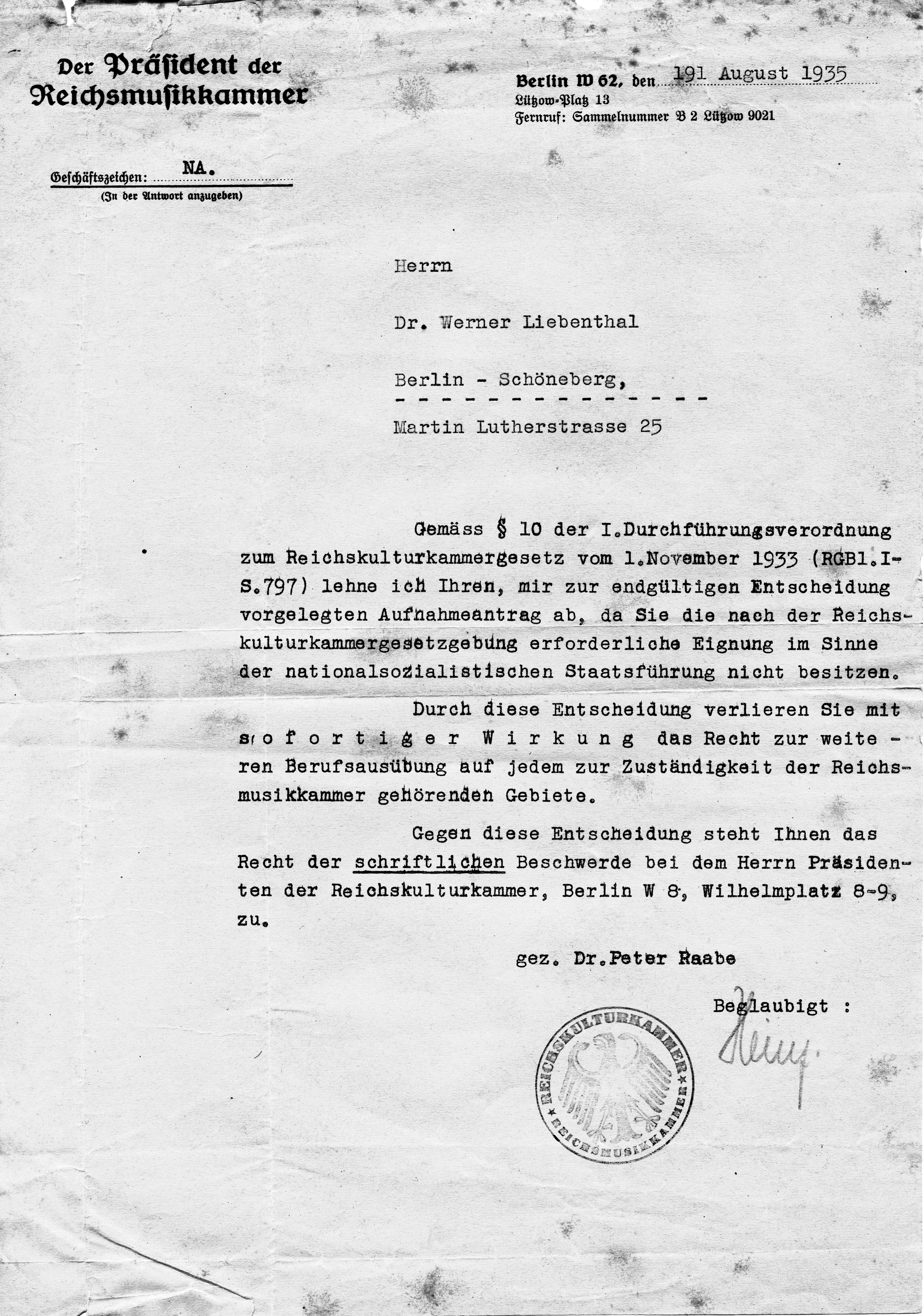
1935 Reichsmusikkammer decree to the Berlin musician Werner Liebenthal dictating the immediate cessation of his professional activity

The Institute's primary goals were to extol and promote "good German music” — specifically that of Beethoven, Wagner, Bach, Mozart, Haydn, Brahms, Bruckner and the like — and legitimize the claimed world supremacy of Germany culturally. These composers and their music were re-interpreted ideologically to extol German virtues and cultural identity. The Nazis highly censored what was considered Entartete Musik (Degenerate Music) including compositions written by Jews, Jewish sympathizers, and political opponents, as well as atonal and expressionist compositions.

Music and composers who did not fall into the RMK's definition of "good German music" were deprecated and then banned. The Institute proscribed various great composers of the past, including the Jewish-by-birth composers Mahler, Mendelssohn, and Schoenberg, and also Debussy, who had married a Jew. The music of politically dissident composers such as Alban Berg was also banned, and composers whose music had ever been considered sexually suggestive or "savage", such as Hindemith, Stravinsky and the like, were denounced as "degenerate", and banned.

Jazz and swing music were seen as degenerate and proscribed. Jazz was labelled Negermusik ("Negro Music"), and swing music was associated with various Jewish bandleaders and composers such as Artie Shaw and Benny Goodman. Also proscribed were Jewish Tin Pan Alley composers like Irving Berlin and George Gershwin.

The Reichsmusikkammer also functioned as a musicians' guild, with composers, performers, conductors, teachers, and instrument manufacturers being obliged to join in order to pursue or continue a career in music. Membership could be denied on grounds of race or politics. Dozens of composers, songwriters, lyricists, and musicians were ruined or forced into exile because for one reason or another (often political or racial) they did not adhere to or comply with the RMK's standards. The career, for instance, of popular operetta composer Leon Jessel was destroyed by the Institute when it promoted boycotts of his music and finally banned it.

== Personnel ==
Although Joseph Goebbels and other high-level Nazis in the Reichskulturkammer (Reich Culture Institute) basically controlled the RMK, titular presidents and vice-presidents were appointed; in the beginning, this was largely for the sake of the Music Institute's public relations and prestige.

President

Because of his international fame, Richard Strauss, although privately a critic of the Nazi Reich, was installed as president of the Reichsmusikkammer in November 1933. Strauss's motivations in accepting the post were largely to protect his Jewish daughter-in-law and Jewish grandchildren, and preserve and conduct the music of banned composers like Mahler, Debussy, and Mendelssohn. He was dismissed from the post in June 1935, when a letter to his Jewish librettist Stefan Zweig, critical of Nazi racial profiling, was intercepted by the Gestapo.

Peter Raabe was appointed president after Strauss's dismissal. For much of his tenure as president, Raabe was not the sole leader regarding musical culture in the Reich: In 1936 Goebbels appointed Heinz Drewes, then general music director of Altenburg, to head a department of music in the Propaganda Ministry, resulting in confused and tangled roles. Raabe tried to resign in 1938, but his resignation was not accepted, and he served until the end of the Reich in 1945.

Vice-president

Renowned conductor Wilhelm Furtwängler was appointed vice-president of the Institute in 1933. However, he refused to adhere to the ban on Hindemith's Mathis der Maler, and resigned in 1934, condemning anti-Semitism.

Paul Graener was appointed vice-president upon Furtwängler's resignation. He resigned in 1941.

== See also ==
- Art of the Third Reich
- Cultural Bolshevism
- Degenerate art
- Degenerate music
- Music in Nazi Germany
- Negermusik
- Reich Music Examination Office
- Swing Kids
