= Rolf Apreck =

German tenor (1928–1989)

Rolf Apreck (9 February 1928 – 21 May 1989) was a German operatic tenor.

== Life ==
=== Training and engagement in Halle ===
Born in Leipzig, Apreck was the son of a bank director and studied singing at the University of Music and Theatre Leipzig from 1946 to 1949. During this time, he was already singing oratorio solo parts in the University Church. His first engagement took him to Halle/Saale, he was a member of the ensemble of the Handel Festival, Halle. At the same time his career as a concert and oratorio singer began. Guest performances with the Thomanerchor and the Dresdner Kreuzchor, Lieder recitals and concerts took him all over the world. In 1956, he was engaged by the Landestheater Halle, where he made his debut with the part of Don Ottavio in Don Giovanni.

=== Chamber singer in Leipzig ===
In 1959, Apreck was awarded the title "Kammersänger" and the National Prize of the German Democratic Republic. From the 1959/60 season, he was engaged as Heldentenor at the Leipzig Opera, whose ensemble he was a member of until 1989.

At the opening of the new Leipzig Opera House, Apreck sang Tigrane in Handel's Radamisto, at his side aming others Hanne-Lore Kuhse, Sigrid Kehl and Bruno Aderhold. During the years of his Leipzig engagement, he sang all the great roles of his profession such as Max in Der Freischütz, Don José in Carmen, the Emperor in Die Frau ohne Schatten in the legendary production by Joachim Herz as well as Florestan in Fidelio, Bacchus in Ariadne auf Naxos, Riccardo in Un ballo in maschera and Alvaro in La forza del destino.

Apreck took on numerous roles from the opera and concert literature of the musical modern age. He sang the tenor part in the premiere of the requiem Deutsches Miserere by Paul Dessau in Leipzig in 1966. His interpretation was also considered outstanding as Pierre in Prokofiev's War and Peace. Towards the end of his career he sang character roles in Zimermann's Die wundersame Schustersfrau and in Janáček's The Makropulos Affair.

Apreck died in Leipzig at the age of 61.

=== Guest appearances ===
Apreck had guest appearances at the Staatsoper Unter den Linden and at the Komische Oper Berlin. In 1965, Apreck also gave a guest performance at the Bolshoi Theatre as Erik in the Flying Dutchman. As a concert singer, he performed in West Germany, Switzerland and England.

=== Film and audio recordings ===
In 1964, he took over the singing part of the role of Erik in the DEFA feature film Der fliegende Holländer. The role itself was played by Herbert Graedtke. Apreck recorded a number of works of classical and contemporary music literature for radio as well as for domestic and foreign record companies with all major Leipzig conductors.

== Recordings ==
Complete recording:

- Johann Sebastian Bach: : Cantatas and other vocal works (Ramin, Leipziger Thomanerchor)
- Georges Bizet: Carmen
- Paul Dessau: Die Verurteilung des Lukullus
- Mozart: Die Entführung aus dem Serail
- Mozart: Great Mass
- Mozart: Cantatas and other vocal work: Requiem
- Heinrich Schütz: Lukas-Passion
- Bedřich Smetana: Die verkaufte Braut
- Handel: Radamisto – With H.-L. Kuhse, S. Kehl, H. Kaphahn, R. Süß, G. Leib conducted H.-T. Margraf, Rundfunkchor Leipzig, Händel-Festspielorchester Halle (3 CDs at Berlin Classics.
