= Ursula Brömme =

German soprano

Ursula Brömme (9 August 1931 – 8 March 2001) was a German singer (first an alto, then a soprano) and music educator.

== Life ==
Born in Halle an der Saale, Brömme came from a family of craftsmen in which house concert was cultivated. In her childhood she received piano lessons, from 1947 she was one of the first students of the piano department at the Staatliche Hochschule für Theater und Musik Halle. Lied accompaniment encouraged her interest in singing. She received private singing lessons and observed in the singing department of the college. In 1948 she joined the class for concert and oratorio singing. The singing teacher Kurt Wichmann recognised her talent and promoted her in the best possible way. After the artistic and pedagogical Staatsexamen, she additionally attended the opera class of the director Heinz Rückert.

In 1953, she made her debut as Emilia in Verdi's Otello at the Stralsund Theatre. She sang among others the old Burya in Jenůfa, the Countess in Der Wildschütz and Frau Reich in The Merry Wives of Windsor. A year later she received an engagement from the studio of the Berlin State Opera. From 1955 to 1959 she worked at the Meiningen Court Theatre. There she switched from alto to soprano.

She came to the attention of the Leipziger Ensemble during a guest performance of Strauss' opera Salome. In 1959, she was engaged as the first soprano at the newly emerging Opera. There she sang numerous roles, among others in Fidelio (Leonore), Carmen (title role), Un ballo in maschera (Amelia), Aida (title role), Der fliegende Holländer (Senta), Die Meistersinger von Nürnberg (Eva), Rienzi (Adriano), The Maid of Orleans (title role), Salome (title role), Die Frau ohne Schatten (Dyer), Tannhäuser (Elisabeth), Jenůfa (title role) and Lady Macbeth of the Mtsensk District (Katarina Ismailova). In 1969, she participated in the premiere of Hanell's The Greek Wedding. Guest appearances in the 1960s took her to the Semperoper Dresden, to the Bavarian State Opera Munich and the Hungarian State Opera House in Budapest. In 1985, she retired.

She also taught at the University of Leipzig and the University of Music and Theatre Leipzig. She was involved in several record productions.

Brömme died in Leipzig at the age of 69.

== Awards ==
In 1965, she was awarded the Art Prize of the GDR; she also held the honorary title of Kammersängerin.

== Publications ==
- Wir waren damals keine Stars. Kammersängerin Ursula Brömme (1931–2000) über die Eröffnung des Opernhauses. In Alexander von Maravić and Harald Müller (ed.): Oper Leipzig. Schlaglichter auf fünf Jahrzehnte Musiktheater. Theater der Zeit, Berlin 2000, ISBN 978-3-940737-81-6, pp. 176 ff.
