= Sigrid Kehl =

German opera singer (1929–2024)

- Kehl in the 1950s
- Born: 23 November 1929; Berlin, Germany
- Died: 18 December 2024 (aged 95); Leipzig, Germany
- Education: Berlin University of the Arts; Berlin State Opera studio
- Occupations: Classical operatic singer (mezzo-soprano and dramatic soprano); Academic teacher
- Organizations: Leipzig Opera; Musikhochschule Leipzig
- Title: Kammersängerin
- Spouse: Friedhelm Eberle
- Children: 1
- Awards: National Prize of the German Democratic Republic; Kunstpreis der Stadt Leipzig

Sigrid Kehl (23 November 1929 – 18 December 2024) was a German operatic mezzo-soprano and later dramatic soprano. Based at the Leipzig Opera for more than 35 years, she also performed leading roles internationally, such as Wagner's Brünnhilde and Isolde. In Leipzig, she portrayed the Nurse in Strauss' Die Frau ohne Schatten, directed by Joachim Herz, from 1963, and the Kostelnička in Janáček's Jenůfa from 1968, conducted by Václav Neumann. In Wagner's Der Ring des Nibelungen directed by Herz, a production from 1973, she appeared as Fricka in Das Rheingold and as Brünnhilde in the other parts.

== Life and career ==
Kehl was born in Berlin on 23 November 1929. (Note: Some sources have 1932 as her year of birth.) After obtaining her Abitur in Arnstadt, Kehl first studied piano, voice and pedagogy at the conservatory of Thuringia in Erfurt from 1948 to 1951. She studied voice and piano further at the Berlin University of the Arts until 1956. She wanted to become a Lieder singer, of songs by Schumann, Brahms and Mahler, thinking that she was too tall for the stage.

She made her debut at the Berlin State Opera while still a member of the opera studio, as a Polowetz woman in Borodin's Prince Igor conducted by Horst Stein. Other beginners' roles included Mamma Lucia in Mascagni's Cavalleria rusticana, Widow Browe in Lortzing's Zar und Zimmermann and Mrs Quickly in Verdi's Falstaff, directed by Joachim Herz. In 1956 she won the second prize at the Robert Schumann International Competition for Pianists and Singers. It led to her engagement at the Leipzig Opera by Helmut Seydelmann who was then Generalmusikdirektor; he overheard her rehearsing for the competition and told her that she was engaged.

=== Leipzig Opera ===
Kehl became a permanent member of the ensemble in 1957 and remained there for over 35 years. In the course of her career she performed more than 70 roles with the Leipzig Opera, ranging from lyrical mezzo-soprano to dramatic soprano. When she began, opera was still played at an interim house in Lindenau. She first performed small roles such as Ines in Verdi's Il trovatore, the Shepherd boy in Puccini's Tosca and the priestess in Verdi's Aida. She appeared as Mercedes in Bizet's Carmen. Her first lead role was Octavian in Der Rosenkavalier by Richard Strauss, still in Lindenau. When the new opera house was opened with Wagner's Die Meistersinger von Nürnberg, she appeared as Magdalene. The same season, she performed Zenobia in Handel's Radamisto and Helene in Prokofiev's War and Peace. Later she included dramatic Verdi mezzo roles in her repertoire, including Amneris in Aida, Princess Eboli in Don Carlos and Lady Macbeth. In 1964 she first performed the challenging role of the Nurse in Strauss' Die Frau ohne Schatten, directed by Herz and conducted by Paul Schmitz. She then tackled Wagner roles, Ortrud in Wagner's Lohengrin, Venus in Tannhäuser and Brangäne in Tristan und Isolde. She also appeared in trousers roles such as Orpheus in Gluck's Orfeo ed Euridice. She performed the role of the Kostelnička in Janáček's Jenůfa in 1968, conducted by Václav Neumann.

At the beginning of the 1970s, Kehl turned to dramatic soprano repertoire, beginning with Leonore in Beethoven's Fidelio in 1970. In 1974 she portrayed Brünnhilde and Fricka in the legendary Ring cycle production by Herz. She first appeared as Wagner's Isolde in 1981, conducted by Kurt Masur. In the 1982/83 season she assumed the role of Kundry in a new production of Wagner's Parsifal.

=== Guest performances ===
Kehl had a guest contract with the Berlin State Opera from 1971, making her debut as the Nurse in a production by Harry Kupfer. She also performed at the Komische Oper Berlin, as Penelope in Monteverdi's Il ritorno d'Ulisse in patria directed by Götz Friedrich. She performed the title role of Elektra by Strauss first at the Theater Hagen in 1977, as a substitute at a few hours' notice, saving the premiere of the new production.

From 1960, Kehl also gave international guest performances; in 1966, she performed as Brünnhilde in Wagner's Siegfried at the Teatro di San Carlo in Naples, alongside Hans Hopf in the title role, and as Sieglinde in Die Walküre at the Teatro Comunale di Bologna. She appeared at the Grand Théâtre de Genève, in the title role of Carl Orff's Antigonae in 1970 and as the Kostelnička in 1972. She performed at the Bern Theatre as Sextus in Mozart's La clemenza di Tito in 1972. At the Vienna State Opera, she appeared as Ortrud (1975/76) and Venus (1979). She performed as Isolde at the Lausanne Opera in 1983, at the Opernhaus Graz, as Fricka in Wagner's Das Rheingold at the Bolshoi Theatre in Moscow, in Prague, Budapest, Sofia and Varna. Her last new role was Herodias in Salome by Strauss, performed at La Fenice in Venice in 1969. She appeared there also as Ortrud and Brangäne, conducted by Zubin Mehta. She performed as the Kostelnička in Jenůfa at the Semperoper in Dresden in another production by Herz.

Kostelnička was her last stage role in Leipzig in 1989. She still had a contract for the 1989/90 season, but preferred to retire due to the changes during the Wende period. She was awarded the title Kammersängerin in 1963, and was appointed an honorary member of the Leipzig Opera in 1990 after she retired.

=== Concert ===
Kehl was active as a concert singer. Early in career she performed as an alto soloist with the Thomanerchor. A performance of Bach's Christmas Oratorio at the Paulinerkirche in Leipzig was broadcast live on 15 December 1963. Performed by Thomanerchor and the Gewandhausorchester, with Elisabeth Breuel, Peter Schreier and Günther Leib, conducted by Erhard Mauersberger, it became a historic document when the church was demolished. The recording was recovered in 2013.

=== Teaching and later years ===
From 1979, Kehl taught voice for a decade as professor at the Musikhochschule Leipzig. She initiated an opera project in 1996 and was artistic director for Telemann's Don Quichotte auf der Hochzeit des Comacho in a collaboration of the music academies of Leipzig and Berlin and the Leipzig Opera. She became a member of the Sächsische Akademie der Künste in 1996.

=== Personal life ===
Kehl was married to the actor Friedhelm Eberle; they lived in Leipzig and had a son. She died on 18 December 2024, at the age of 95.

== Recordings ==
Kehl made recordings for radio and both live and studio recordings with the label Eterna. Some recordings were reissued on CD, including Mercedes in Carmen in a 1960 complete recording with Soňa Červená and Rolf Apreck, conducted by Herbert Kegel, Zenobia in Handel's Radamisto, Preziosilla in Verdi's La forza del destino and Princess Eboli in Don Carlos, both in excerpts with Hanne-Lore Kuhse and Martin Ritzmann, conducted by Heinz Fricke. A solo recital entitled Ein Opernabend mit Sigrid Kehl was also published.

== Awards ==
Kehl received several awards, including:

- 1967 National Prize of the German Democratic Republic
- 1976 Kunstpreis der Stadt Leipzig, for the collective team realising Der Ring des Nibelungen around Joachim Herz
- 1976 Robert Schumann Prize of the City of Zwickau (with Eliso Virsaladze)
