= Wlaschiha =

Wlaschiha is a Germanized version of Czech surname Vlačiha. Notable people with the surname include:

- Ekkehard Wlaschiha (1938–2019), German operatic baritone
- Tom Wlaschiha (born 1973), German actor and voice actor
