= Ekkehard Wlaschiha =

German operatic baritone (1938–2019)

- Born: 28 May 1938; Pirna, Saxony, Germany
- Died: 20 February 2019 (aged 80); Bayreuth, Bavaria, Germany
- Education: Musikhochschule Weimar
- Occupation: Operatic baritone
- Organizations: Nationaltheater Weimar; Leipzig Opera; Bayreuth Festival
- Awards: Grammy Awards

Ekkehard Wlaschiha (German pronunciation: [ˈɛkəhaʁt ˈvlaʃɪhaː]; 28 May 1938 – 20 February 2019) was a German operatic baritone who specialized in Wagnerian "villains", such as Alberich, Klingsor and Friedrich von Telramund. He performed at the Bayreuth Festival and at the Metropolitan Opera, and left many recordings.

== Life and career ==
Wlaschiha was born in Pirna, Saxony, and studied music at the Musikhochschule in Weimar, after he had been rejected at the Musikhochschule Dresden. He began his operatic career at the Theater Gera, followed by the Sächsisches Landestheater Dresden-Radebeul, the Nationaltheater Weimar from 1966, and the Leipzig Opera from 1970, where he took part in the world premiere of Robert Hanell's Griechische Hochzeit on 31 May 1969, and in the world premiere of Fritz Geißler's Der Schatten in 1975.

He was a member of the Berlin State Opera from 1982. Among his major roles there were Wagner characters: Telramund in Lohengrin, Amfortas and Klingsor in Parsifal, Kurwenal in Tristan und Isolde, Hans Sachs in Die Meistersinger von Nürnberg and the title role in Der fliegende Holländer. He appeared as Don Pizarro in Beethoven's Fidelio, Kaspar in Weber's Der Freischütz, Jochanaan in Salome by Richard Strauss, Escamillo in Bizet's Carmen, Amonasro in Verdi's Aida and the title role in his Rigoletto.

A regular guest at the Dresdner Staatsoper, Wlaschiha first appeared at the Bayreuth Festival in 1984 as Alberich in Götterdämmerung. Alberich became his signature role, performed in Bayreuth until 1998, then conducted by James Levine. He appeared there also as Kurwenal in Tristan und Isolde in 1986, conducted by Daniel Barenboim, as Telramund in Lohengrin, as Biterolf in Tannhäuser and as Klingsor in Parsifal. He appeared as Kaspar in Weber's Der Freischütz when the Semperoper was reopened on 13 February 1985, staged by Joachim Herz and conducted by Wolf-Dieter Hauschild. He was Jochanaan in Salome by Richard Strauss at the Bavarian State Opera in Munich in 1987, opposite Hildegard Behrens in the title role. In 1988, he made his debut as Alberich at the Royal Opera House in London. Again as Alberich, he was filmed in the 1989 video broadcast of Der Ring des Nibelungen from the Metropolitan Opera, which won him international recognition. He sang alongside James Morris as Wotan, Siegfried Jerusalem as Siegfried and Behrens as Brünnhilde, conducted by Levine. He also appeared at the Met in Salome, Parsifal and Fidelio. He appeared as Telramund on a DVD from the Bayreuth Festival, conducted by Peter Schneider, with sets and costumes by filmmaker Werner Herzog. He retired from the stage as Pizarro in Beethoven's Fidelio at the Semperoper in 1998.

Wlaschiha won two Grammy Awards, in 1990 and 1991, both for recording the role of Alberich with the Metropolitan Opera on DG. His portrayal of the role was described as not a pure villain, but as a person with inner conflicts. His voice, which he described as with "a certain bite, a certain metal" ("Meine Stimme hatte immer einen gewissen Biss, ein gewisses Metall."), was intense, but with a wide scale of expression ("eine breite Skala von Ausdrucksmöglichkeiten"). He is remembered as a singer of powerful vocal presence and the ability to present multi-faceted personalities on stage. He had an unusual ability to maintain a relaxed legato line even when singing music with wide jumps in pitch and sudden changes in volume ("barks") such as the role of Alberich.

Wlaschiha also performed in concert and oratorio. On a 1984 recording of Bach's St Matthew Passion, conducted by Peter Schreier who also took the part of the Evangelist, he appeared as Pilate.

Wlaschiha died in Bayreuth on 20 February 2019. Actor Tom Wlaschiha is his nephew.
