= Joachim Herz =

German opera director

- Joachim Herz, in the 1960s
- Born: 15 June 1924; Dresden, Germany
- Died: 18 October 2010 (aged 86); Paris, France
- Education: Kreuzschule; Hochschule für Musik Dresden; Humboldt University of Berlin
- Occupations: Opera director; Opera manager
- Organizations: Komische Oper Berlin; Leipzig Opera; Semperoper
- Awards: National Prize of the GDR

Joachim Herz (15 June 1924 – 18 October 2010) was a German opera director and manager. He learned at the Komische Oper Berlin as an assistant to Walter Felsenstein. His major stations were the Leipzig Opera where he opened the new house with Wagner's Die Meistersinger von Nürnberg, Komische Oper and Semperoper in Dresden, where he opened the restored house with Weber's Der Freischütz in 1985. He staged many world premieres, and worked internationally. Herz was the first director to apply Felsenstein's concepts to Wagner's Der Ring des Nibelungen, staged in Leipzig from 1973 to 1976.

== Life ==
Born in Dresden, Herz attended the Kreuzschule there, completing with the Abitur in 1942. He then studied piano, clarinet and music pedagogy at the Hochschule für Musik Dresden. His studies were interrupted by military service in 1944 and 1945 but completed in 1948. He then studied opera direction there with Heinz Arnold, later also musicology at the Humboldt University of Berlin. His first direction work was in 1950 Richard Mohaupt's Die Bremer Stadtmusikanten at the Kleines Haus (small hall) in Dresden.

In 1951, he became a stage director at the Landesbühnen Sachsen in Radebeul. In 1953, he moved to the Komische Oper Berlin where he was a student and assistant of Walter Felsenstein until 1956. After a brief interlude at the Cologne Opera (1956–1957), he came to the Leipzig Opera as opera director (Oberspielleiter) and from 1959 also manager (Direktor). He opened the new opera house in 1960 with Wagner's Die Meistersinger von Nürnberg. Some of his productions toured the world. Herz caused a particular sensation with his Der Ring des Nibelungen, completed in Leipzig in 1976. This benchmark production provided the main conceptual impetus for Chéreau's Bayreuth Jahrhundertring.

In 1976, Herz returned to the Komische Oper Berlin, succeeding Felsenstein. In retrospect, this move has been considered luckless. His sometimes gruff style of work and his lack of concern for the Socialist Unity Party of Germany bureaucrats met with little approval. His replacement in 1981 was therefore not unexpected.

Herz was from 1981 to 1991 chief director at the Dresden State Opera, from 1985 in the reopened Semperoper, for whose opening he staged Weber's Der Freischütz.

Herz staged productions all over the world beginning in 1959. He worked at the Bolshoi Theatre in Moscow as well as at the Teatro Colón in Buenos Aires, in London and in Vancouver. Herz staged a total of 126 productions and new productions of over 60 operas, many of which have become classics.

He taught at the Leipzig University from 1976, and from 1981 as head of the department of opera direction of the Musikhochschule Dresden. He lectured internationally.

Herz died in Leipzig at the age of 86.

== Wagner's Der Ring des Nibelungen directed by Herz ==
Between 1973 and 1976, Joachim Herz staged all four parts of the Ring at the Leipzig Opera House. Contrary to the performance practice of the time, which was primarily influenced by the works of Wieland Wagner, Herz sought the conceptual key for the tetralogy in Wagner himself, especially in his social revolutionary views, which made him a barricade fighter in the 1848er Revolution and which he expounded in numerous of his writings. In 1848, Wagner began writing the Ring poem. Herz took up this coincidence of time and content and interpreted the Ring as "a play about the class struggles of the 19th century.""Wagner has now alienated this class struggle tragedy of the 19th century, chosen a parable-like form for it, and as an alienating costume has put Nordic mythology over it, from which he has also drawn decisive moments of conflict in the fable's direction." (Joachim Herz) The directing team also drew essential impulses from George Bernard Shaw's Ring analysis The Perfect Wagnerite: A Commentary on The Niblung's Ring (published in London in 1889). Shaw was the first to interpret Wagner's tetralogy as a reflection of the socio-economic upheavals of the 19th century.

For the first time, the Leipzig production also applied the principles of realistic music theatre, as developed by Felsenstein, to Wagner's Ring. Both Herz and the conductor of the tetralogy, Gert Bahner, and Rudolf Heinrich, responsible for stage design and costumes, had been Felsenstein students. In the conceptual preliminary work (July to September 1972) Herz and Heinrich developed the thematic-staging core points and the visual worlds of their Ring interpretation. In their conception, the gold that is forged into the ring by Alberich is "first of all beautiful nature", transforms into artistically treated nature (the ring), which is also suitable as an object of exchange, and finally mutates into the "basis of a universal exchange value". "The ring is a principle: it signifies the possibility of primitive accumulation of capital. It signifies a potentiation of wealth and power." (Herz) Herz and Heinrich gave the ring the shape of a golden fist in their interpretation: A denaturalisation of the human hand that will look like brass knuckles. At the end of Götterdämmerung, the ring transformed back into "a gold web, a golden gossamer, dreamlike and wafting like a veil. With it the Rhinemaidens float away in their gondolas to the laced floor."

Heinrich's pictorial worlds are characterised by a collage technique of historically authenticated details, which he alleviated with fairy-tale and abstract elements. In this way, he created a correspondence between historicity and supra-temporal myth. The castle of the gods Valhalla, for example, was a compilation of the Palais de la Justice in Brussels, the staircase of Vienna's Burgtheater by Gottfried Semper and a glass dome from Turin.

An essential question of the Ring interpretation was what actually perishes at the end of Götterdämmerung: the world as such or the world of Wotan? Herz and Heinrich decided that it is the world of Wotan and his adversary Alberich (who is only the alter ego of the father of the gods, as they deduced from the musical analysis of both leitmotifs) that is destroyed here. Consequently, Herz reinterpreted "Siegfried's Funeral March" as Wotan's abdication: the father of the gods (who actually no longer appears in this opera) strides saluting through a deserted trellis of eagle pylons. The final image of the Leipzig production showed the men and women, not further defined by Wagner, on an empty stage. "At the end, it's tabula rasa: the old has been wiped out. Now a new one begins. How this new is to be constituted is not to be shown at this point. Wagner did not know." (Herz)

=== Premieres and casts ===
- Das Rheingold, premiere on 7 April 1973. With Rainer Lüdeke (Wotan), Sigrid Kehl (Fricka), Karel Berman (Alberich), Günter Kurth (Loge) among others.
- Die Walküre, premiere on 9 February 1974. with Günter Kurth (Siegmund), Els Bolkestein (Sieglinde), Fritz Hübner (Hunding), Sigrid Kehl (Brünnhilde), Renate Härtel (Fricka), András Faragó (Wotan) among others.
- Siegfried, premiere on 25 October 1975, with Jon Weaving (Siegfried), Guntfried Speck (Mime), Rainer Lüdeke (Der Wanderer), Thomas M. Thomaschke (Fafner), Sigrid Kehl (Brünnhilde) among others.
- Götterdämmerung, premiere on 28 March 1976. with Jon Weaving (Siegfried), Sigrid Kehl (Brünnhilde), Ekkehard Wlaschiha (Gunther), Hanna Lisowska (Gutrune), Karel Berman (Alberich), Fritz Hübner (Hagen) among others.

=== Criticism ===
- "Both Joachim Herz's production and Rudolf Heinrich's stage design and costumes faithfully adhere to Wagner's own specifications, and that is not exactly common anymore, since Wieland Wagner. Of course, they don't fall back into the hollow pathos, the clashing of weapons and swinging of swords that Wieland Wagner discarded, but they do move radically away again from that extreme stylisation that has been commonplace since 1951, and return to the "core" of Wagner's scene directions in a modern way." (...) "Any institute that can boast a production as excellent and overwhelming as this 'Rheingold' performance has worked its way up among the best in the world."
- The FAZ attests Herz's Ring "great provocative power and consistency."
- The Herald Tribune called Das Rheingold a "stunning performance" that also made "a little theatrical history."
- This return of the RING to the theatre, the retheatricalisation of events over which the mists of Nordic-mythical boredom had so long hung penetratingly, probably strikes the viewer first. (...) There are no dull stretches of the Nibelungen in which nothing but beautiful pathos is offered; theatre is played, and with such fervour that one imagines oneself at least in Salome." Ernst Krause in Opernwelt, June 1976

== Further productions ==
- Dresden: Die Bremer Stadtmusikanten (Richard Mohaupt) (1950) – Herz' graduate performance, which he himself called "the legendary Mohaupt performance".
- Komische Oper Berlin
  - Die Zauberflöte (Mozart, 1954)
  - Manon Lescaut (Puccini, 1955)
  - Der brave Soldat Schwejk (Robert Kurka)
  - Der junge Lord (Henze, 1969)
  - Aufstieg und Fall der Stadt Mahagonny (Weill, 1977)
  - Madama Butterfly (Puccini, 1978)
  - Das Land Bum-Bum (Georg Katzer, world premiere, 1978)
  - Lulu (Berg, with Ursula Reinhardt-Kiss, 1980)
  - Peter Grimes (Britten, 1981)
  - Der fliegende Holländer (Wagner)
- Oper Leipzig:
  - Die Meistersinger von Nürnberg (Wagner, 1960)
  - Krieg und Frieden (Prokofiev, 1961)
  - Katja Kabanowa (Janáček)
  - Boris Godunov (Mussorgski)
  - Die Frau ohne Schatten (Richard Strauss)
  - Lohengrin (Wagner)
  - Tannhäuser (Wagner)
  - all major Mozart operas
  - Griechische Hochzeit (Robert Hanell)
  - Die Jungfrau von Orleans (Tchaikovsky)
  - Die Zaubergeige (Egk)
  - Les Huguenots (Meyerbeer)
  - Serse (Handel, 1973)
  - Der Ring des Nibelungen (Wagner, 1976)
  - Le Grand Macabre (Ligeti, 1992)
- Opera film Der fliegende Holländer (Wagner, DEFA 1964)
- Vienna State Opera: Die Zauberflöte (Mozart)
- Salzburg Festival: Der Rosenkavalier (Richard Strauss)
- Aalto-Theater Essen: Die Liebe zu den drei Orangen (Prokofiev)
- Semperoper Dresden:
  - Der Freischütz (Weber, opening in 1985)
  - Der Rosenkavalier (Strauss, 1985)
  - Ariadne auf Naxos (Strauss)
  - Salome (Strauss)
  - Wozzeck (Berg)
  - Die Nase (Shostakovich, 1986)
  - Die Liebe zu den drei Orangen (Prokofiev, 1990)
  - Così fan tutte (Mozart)
  - Der goldene Topf (Eckehard Mayer)
  - Osud (Janáček)

== Honours ==
- In 1985 Herz received the National Prize of the GDR I. Class for Art and Literature.
- In 2005 he became an honorary member of the Komische Oper Berlin.
- On 9 January 2009 he was awarded an honorary doctorate by the Hochschule für Musik Carl Maria von Weber Dresden.

== Trivia ==
Herz was the first director to set the Ring des Nibelungen as a parable of 19th century capitalism. After that, there was hardly a production without this background. Patrice Chéreau's Bayreuth Jahrhundertring in 1976, was based entirely on Herz's innovation, which alone would have made Herz a superstar in the opera world today. Unlike Chereau's Ring, Herz's interpretation was not recorded on video because this technology was not yet available in the GDR at the time. The epoch-making production is documented only in two workbooks of the Academy of Arts of the German Democratic Republic.

== Publication ==
- Stephan Stompor (ed.), Walter Felsenstein, Joachim Herz: Musiktheater : Beiträge zur Methodik und zu Inszenierungskonzeptionen. Leipzig : Reclam, 1976
