= Stephan Stompor =

German musicologist (1931–1995)

Stephan Stompor (14 February 1931 – 23 October 1995) was a German musicologist and dramaturg.

== Life ==
Born in Königshütte (Oberschlesien), Stompor studied opera direction at the Staatliche Hochschule für Theater und Musik Halle with Heinz Rückert. From 1954, he worked as a director of the Brandenburger Theater and at the Staatstheater Schwerin, as a dramaturge at the Opernhaus Leipzig and as a director of the Landestheater Halle. In 1967, wurde er Dramaturg an der Komische Oper Berlin, wo er mit den Intendanten Walter Felsenstein and Joachim Herz sowie mit Götz Friedrich zusammenarbeitete. 1975 wurde er mit der Dissertation Deutschsprachige Aufführungen von Opern Händels im 18. Jahrhundert in Halle promoviert. Stompor gab Programmhefte und Libretti heraus. Er verfasste Beiträge zur Geschichte des Musiktheaters, insbesondere über die Zeit des Nationalsozialismus. Aufgrund seiner schweren Erkrankung konnten Teile seiner Arbeit erst postum veröffentlicht werden.

Stompor died in Berlin at the age of 64.

== Publications ==
- Jüdisches Musik- und Theaterleben unter dem NS-Staat. Ed. by Andor Izsák, Susanne Borchers. Hannover : Europ. Zentrum für Jüdische Musik, 2001
- Künstler im Exil : in Oper, Konzert, Operette, Tanztheater, Schauspiel, Kabarett, Rundfunk, Film, Musik- und Theaterwissenschaft sowie Ausbildung in 62 Ländern. 2 volumes. Frankfurt : Lang, 1994
- Die Komische Oper Berlin : Geschichte und Gegenwart. Berlin : Komische Oper, 1991
- Ilse Kobán, Stephan Stompor (ed.): Walter Felsenstein : Theater muss immer etwas Totales sein : Briefe, Reden, Aufzeichnungen, Interviews. Berlin : Henschelverlag, 1986
- Giuseppe Verdi, Francesco Maria Piave: La traviata : Oper in drei Akten. Translation Walter Felsenstein. Zum Werk Stephan Stompor. Kassel : Bärenreiter; Leipzig : Edition Peters, 1984.
- (ed.): Otto Klemperer: Über Musik und Theater : Erinnerungen, Gespräche, Skizzen. Wilhelmshaven : Heinrichshofen, 1982, 1993
- (ed.): Texte zur Aesthetik, Dramaturgie und Aufführungspraxis der deutschen Oper im 18. und 19. Jahrhundert. Berlin : Verband der Theaterschaffenden der Deutschen Demokratischen Republik, 1975
- (ed.): Texte zur Ästhetik, Dramaturgie und Aufführungspraxis der Deutschen Oper von ihrem Entstehen bis zur Gegenwart : Äußerungen ausländischer Komponisten, Wissenschaftler und Regisseure. Berlin : Verband d. Theaterschaffenden d. DDR, 1977
- (ed.): Musiktheater : Beiträge zur Methodik und zu Inszenierungskonzeptionen. Walter Felsenstein, Joachim Herz. Leipzig : Reclam, 1976. after the 1972 Republikflucht in contrast to the 1970 edition without his contributions.
- Sergej Prokofjew : das Leben, Schaffen u. Wirken d. sowjet. Komponisten : anlässlich d. 80. Geburtstages Prokofjews im April 1971. Berlin : Gesellschaft f. deutsch-sowjetische Freundschaft, Abt. Kulturpolitik, 1971.
- (ed.): Musiktheater : Beiträge zur Methodik und zu Inszenierungs-Konzeptionen. Walter Felsenstein, Götz Friedrich, Joachim Herz. Leipzig : Reclam, 1970
- Dmitri Schostakowitsch: Katerina Ismailowa : Opera in 4acts (9 Bildern); Fassung 1963. Aus dem Russ. übers. by Joachim Herz. Einführung von Stephan Stompor. Leipzig : Reclam 1965
- Georges Bizet, Henri Meilhac, Ludovic Halévy: Carmen : Oper in vier Akten. Textbuch. Deutsche Fassung von Walter Felsenstein. Einführung von Stephan Stompor. Leipzig : Reclam, 1962
- Deutschsprachige Aufführungen von Opern Händels im 18. Jahrhundert. Dissertation Halle, 1975
