= Rudolf Heinrich =

German stage designer

Rudolf Heinrich (10 February 1926 – 1 December 1975) was a German stage designer.

== Life and career ==
Born in Halle (Saale), Heinrich attended the painting class of the Burg Giebichenstein University of Art and Design in Halle from 1946 to 1948 with Charles Crodel, Max Elten and others. Afterwards, he was assistant stage designer in Leipzig in 1948.

From 1950 to 1959, he worked at the Landestheater Halle as the head of the equipment department. He created stage sets for 33 plays in opera, ballet and drama. In 1957, he received the Handel Prize in Halle for sets for Handel's operas (Ezio, Radamisto, Poro and others). In 1959, he won the 1st prize of the Théatre National de l'Odéon in Paris for The Tales of Hoffmann.

For the opening of the new Leipzig Opera, he created the décor for Die Meistersinger von Nürnberg in 1960. In the same year, he worked with Walter Felsenstein at the Komische Oper Berlin, where he set Verdi's opera Otello, and was awarded the National Prize of the GDR.

In 1961, he was appointed to the Academy of Arts, Berlin, but moved to West Germany. From 1962, he worked in Munich with Fritz Kortner, Günther Rennert, Joachim Herz, Otto Schenk among others.

Heinrich became head of the stage design class at the Academy of Fine Arts Munich in 1964. From that year, he was professor of the stage design class at the Bavarian Academy of Fine Arts. He worked mainly for the opera houses in Munich, Hamburg, Schwetzingen, Mannheim, Zurich, Vienna, Frankfurt, Santa Fee, Paris, Moscow, Leipzig, Berlin, the Salzburg Festival, the Metropolitan Opera, La Scala, Zurich and London, as well as the Austrian Theatre Museum in (Vienna).

From 1973 to 1975, he created the set for The Ring of the Nibelung in Leipzig with Joachim Herz. He was appointed to the Academy of Arts in West Berlin in 1973.

Heinrich died in London on 1 December 1975 at the age of 49, while working on the set design for Salomé. His burial place is on the Ramersdorf-Perlach in Munich. He was married to the US-American soprano Joan Carroll and had a son. His brother was the costume and stage designer Reinhard Heinrich.

The Akademie der Künste Berlin has a Rudolf Heinrich collection with about 3000 works by hm.

== Filmography ==
- 1967: Liebe für Liebe (tele film)
- 1974: Maß für Maß (telefilm)
