= Erich-Alexander Winds =

German theatre director and actor

Erich-Alexander Winds (15 September 1900 – 9 September 1972) was a German theatre director and actor.

== Life ==
Born in Dredsden as son of a director and an actress, Winds started his career in Leipzig at the age of 18 with the knowledge he had acquired at home. Via several stations he came to Wuppertal, where in 1945 he again took up the post of artistic director of the Wuppertaler Bühnen, which he had only resigned from in 1944. From there, he was engaged at the Schauspiel Leipzig as drama director from 1 June 1953. In 1955, he went to the Staatsoper Unter den Linden, where he was chief director until 1969. In 1966, he was appointed as a lecturer at the Ernst Busch Academy of Dramatic Arts.

He took part in several television films and DEFA films as a director as well as an actor. He also directed radio plays.

Winds was married in second marriage to the actress Gisela Bestehorn.

Winds died in Berlin at the age of 71.

== Theatre ==
- 1946: Massenet: Manon – direction(Wuppertaler Bühnen)
- 1953: Schiller: Die Jungfrau von Orleans – direction (Schauspiel Leipzig)
- 1954: Sartre: The Respectful Prostitute – direction (Städtisches Theater Leipzig – Kammerspiele)
- 1954: Hedda Zinner: Der Teufelskreis – direction (Schauspiel Leipzig)
- 1955: Hebbel: Judith – direction (Leipziger Schauspielhaus)
- 1955: Beethoven: Fidelio – direction (Staatsoper Unter den Linden)
- 1955: Tchaikovsky: Eugene Onegin – direction (Deutsche Staatsoper Berlin)
- 1955: Richard Wagner: Die Meistersinger von Nürnberg – direction (Deutsche Staatsoper Berlin)
- 1956: Giuseppe Verdi: Aida – directione (Deutsche Staatsoper Berlin)
- 1956: George Bernard Shaw: Die Häuser des Herrn Sartorius – direction (Maxim-Gorki-Theater Berlin)
- 1957: Borodin: Prince Igor – direction (Deutsche Staatsoper Berlin)
- 1958: Eugen Suchoň: Krútňava – direction (Deutsche Staatsoper Berlin)
- 1958: Prokofief: Betrothal in a Monastery – direction (Deutsche Staatsoper Berlin)
- 1958: Hans Lucke: Kaution – direction (Maxim-Gorki-Theater Berlin)
- 1958: Bartók: Bluebeard's Castle – direction (Deutsche Staatsoper Berlin)
- 1959: Wolfgang Amadeus Mozart: Le nozze di Figaro – direction (Deutsche Staatsoper Berlin)
- 1959: Jean Kurt Forest: Der arme Konrad – direction (Deutsche Staatsoper Berlin) UA
- 1960: Gerhart Hauptmann: Fuhrmann Henschel – direction (Volksbühne Berlin)
- 1960: Strauss: Der Rosenkavalier – direction (Deutsche Staatsoper Berlin)
- 1960: Verdi: Don Carlos – direction (Deutsche Staatsoper Berlin)
- 1961: Kurt Schwaen: Leonce und Lena – direction (Deutsche Staatsoper Berlin – Apollosaal)
- 1961: Egk: Peer Gynt – direction (Deutsche Staatsoper Berlin)
- 1962: Wagner: Tannhäuser – direction (Deutsche Staatsoper Berlin)
- 1962: Wagner: Die Meistersinger von Nürnberg – direction (Deutsche Staatsoper Berlin)
- 1962: Tchaikovsky: Eugene Onegin – direction (Deutsche Staatsoper Berlin)
- 1962: Verdi: Un ballo in maschera – direction (Deutsche Staatsoper Berlin)
- 1963: Donizetti: Don Pasquale – direction (Deutsche Staatsoper Berlin)
- 1963: Humperdinck: Hänsel und Gretel – direction (Deutsche Staatsoper Berlin)
- 1964: Verdi: Lady Macbeth – direction (Deutsche Staatsoper Berlin)
- 1964: Prokofief: The Story of a Real Man – direction (Deutsche Staatsoper Berlin)
- 1964: Strauss: Ariadne auf Naxos (Haushofmeister) – director Erhard Fischer (Deutsche Staatsoper Berlin)
- 1965: Nestroy: Einen Jux will er sich machen – direction (Leipziger Schauspielhaus)
- 1965: Mozart: Così fan tutte (Italienische Fassung) – direction (Deutsche Staatsoper Berlin)
- 1968: Henze: Der junge Lord (Sir Edgar) – direction: Joachim Herz (Komische Oper Berlin)

== Filmography ==
- 1955: Wer seine Frau lieb hat

== Radio plays ==
- 1957: Sartre: Nekrassov (Polizeiinspektor) – (Rundfunk der DDR)
- 1958: Gerhard Rentzsch/Karl Wagert: Der Fall van der Lubbe – (Rundfunk der DDR)
- 1958: Henrik Ibsen: Stützen der Gesellschaft (Kaufmann Wiegeland) – (Hörspiel – Rundfunk der DDR)
- 1958: Pavel Kohout: So eine Liebe – (Hörspiel – Rundfunk der DDR)

== Awards and honours ==
- 1961: Title: Professor
- 1965: Patriotic Order of Merit of the GDR in silver
- 1969: Honorary member of the Staatsoper Unter den Linden
