= Gustav Brecher =

German conductor, composer and musicologist (1879–1940)

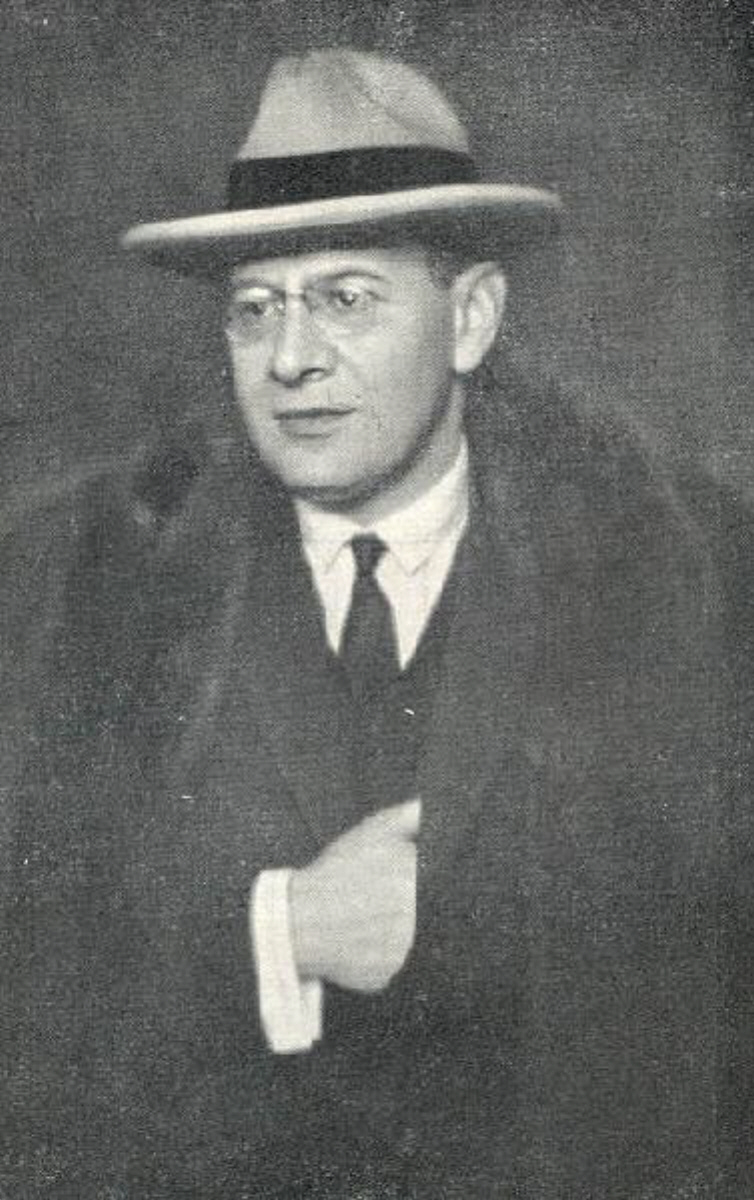
- Gustav Brecher between 1903 and 1911; photograph by Rudolf Dührkoop
- Born: 5 February 1879; Eichwald, Austria-Hungary
- Died: May 1940 (aged 61); Ostend, Belgium
- Occupations: Conductor; Composer; Music critic
- Organizations: Hamburg State Opera; Leipzig Opera

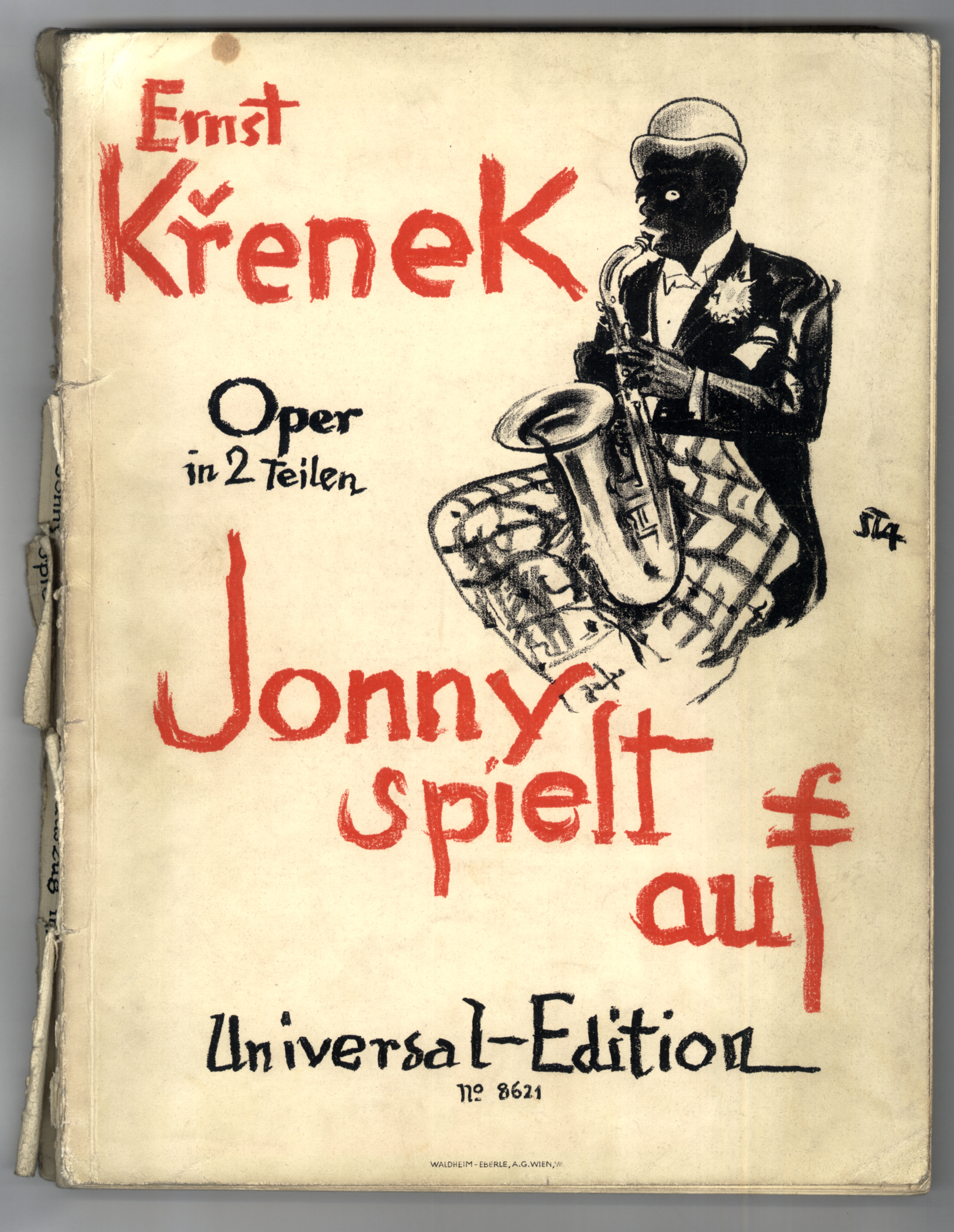
Brecher also conducted the world premiere of Ernst Krenek's opera

Gustav Brecher (5 February 1879 – May 1940) was a German conductor, composer, and music critic. As director of the Leipzig Opera, he conducted world premieres of works by Ernst Krenek and Kurt Weill, including Jonny spielt auf and Rise and Fall of the City of Mahagonny. He was dismissed by the Nazis in 1933, lived at risk in Stalingrad, Berlin, Prague, and finally Ostend, where he took his life together with his wife's.

== Life ==
Brecher was born in Eichwald, Ore Mountains, then in Austria-Hungary. His Jewish family moved from Bohemia to Leipzig in 1889. Brecher was taught there by Salomon Jadassohn. Richard Strauss conducted his tone poem Rosmersholm in 1896. Brecher made his debut in 1897 at the Leipzig Opera. From 1901, he conducted at the Vienna Court Opera alongside Gustav Mahler. Between 1903 and 1911 he was Kapellmeister at the Hamburg State Opera, where he conducted the world premiere of Busoni's Die Brautwahl. After conducting at the Cologne Opera and Oper Frankfurt, Brecher was Generalmusikdirektor (GMD) at the Leipzig Opera from 1924. He was particularly controversial there because of the premieres of Krenek's operas Jonny spielt auf and Leben des Orest, and Weill's Rise and Fall of the City of Mahagonny:

The house was so raging that you literally didn't hear the orchestra during the entire closing of the play, I was on duty there. Brecher conducted the opera to the end with a lime-pale face.

— Report of the répétiteur, Aufstieg und Fall der Stadt Mahagonny

Although the Jonny opera was a success, Brecher was dismissed after the Nazis seized power in the spring of 1933, based on the Law for the Restoration of the Professional Civil Service. In the Neue Zeitschrift für Musik, the musicologist Alfred Heuß wrote a malicious commentary on the occasion of the Rienzi performance during the Wagner Festival week on 12 February 1933: "Unsuspecting, Brecher handled his peculiarly small baton for the last time in a Wagner performance." His last appearance in Leipzig was probably Weill's Der Silbersee on 4 March 1933, when he left the podium during the performance because of constant roaring by the SA present, who were attacking his Jewish origins and objecting to the opera. The mayor of Leipzig, Carl Friedrich Goerdeler, granted him leave on 11 March 1933. His path into exile cannot be traced in detail. He conducted the radio orchestra in Leningrad in five concerts. There in 1934, Georges Sébastian wrote:

The terrible years in Germany were a moral humiliation for him. Brecher arrived in Leningrad in a state of great depression. Everything that could happen had happened, but success on the outside was not there. After his second concert we sat together. I had succeeded in making him nominally the leader of the Leningrad orchestra. Brecher said: "Dear friend, there is nothing more to be done – it is over – at my age. One must be able to speak." Despite his gift for languages he could not speak a word. There was something inside him he was not up to. He felt constantly persecuted – he had the obsession that somewhere the Nazis would reach him.

Brecher lived in Berlin for a while, when Erich Ebermayer noted on 13 October 1935 in his diary:

Today I had a shocking encounter in Grunewald. On the lonely narrow paths leading over to the Havel, I never meet anyone in the morning. Only a few deer cross my tracks or I cross theirs. Today, however, I met two people: Gustav Brecher, the former Generalmusikdirektor of Leipzig, and his wife, the daughter of privy councillor Deutsch, the creator of the AEG and friend of Walther Rathenau. But how much these two people have changed since I was last in Leipzig in their hospitable house! Above all, Brecher himself seems to suffer deeply under the outlawry and to have been struck at the core of his being; he cannot live without music as the true musician he is. Frau Brecher is more vital and visibly willing to survive the Nazis. Both still have their fortunes, live in her beautiful Dahlem house and are, at least materially, independent. But for how much longer? We have a longer political discussion, but Frau Brecher screams out loudly that it will be life-threatening. Fortunately only squirrels are listening. Finally, the Brechers shyly and with embarrassment ask me if I would have any reservations about coming to their house for tea. I happily accept. How times change! What an honor it was to be invited to the "General" in Leipzig...!

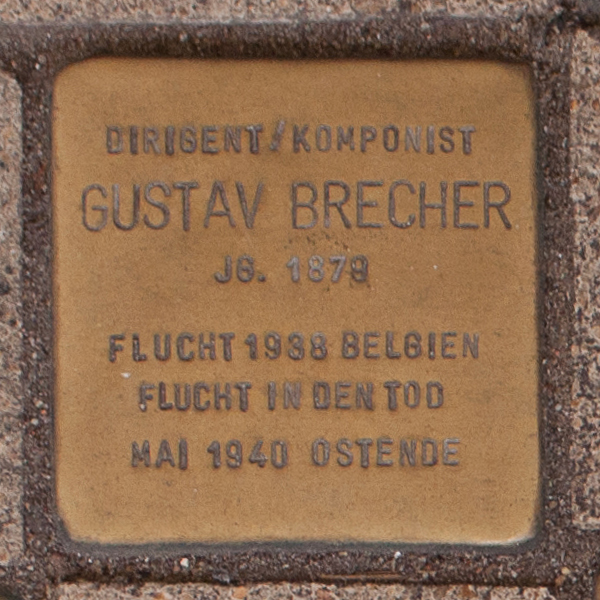
Stolperstein for Gustav Brecher in front of the Hamburgische Staatsoper

Brecher moved to Prague, where he had to flee once more in 1938. He spent almost a year in Ostend, Belgium, from spring 1939 to May 1940, staying first the Hôtel Wellington and then at the Hôtel Littoral, both on the seafront. He was with his wife Gertrud Deutsch (daughter of Helene and Felix Deutsch), his mother-in-law, Elisabeth 'Lili' Kahn Deutsch and her housekeeper/maid, Hermine Voigtmann. The latter, who was not Jewish, left Ostend in August 1939 The fate of the Brecher family is not known but they disappeared without a trace around May 1940 when the Germans occupied Belgium. Their files in the National Archives of Belgium (Algemeen Rijksarchief) in Brussels retrospectively state they "left for England". It is not certain if they committed suicide or perished at sea.

A Stolperstein in front of the Hamburg State Opera reminds of his fate.
