= Alfred Heuß =

German musicologist

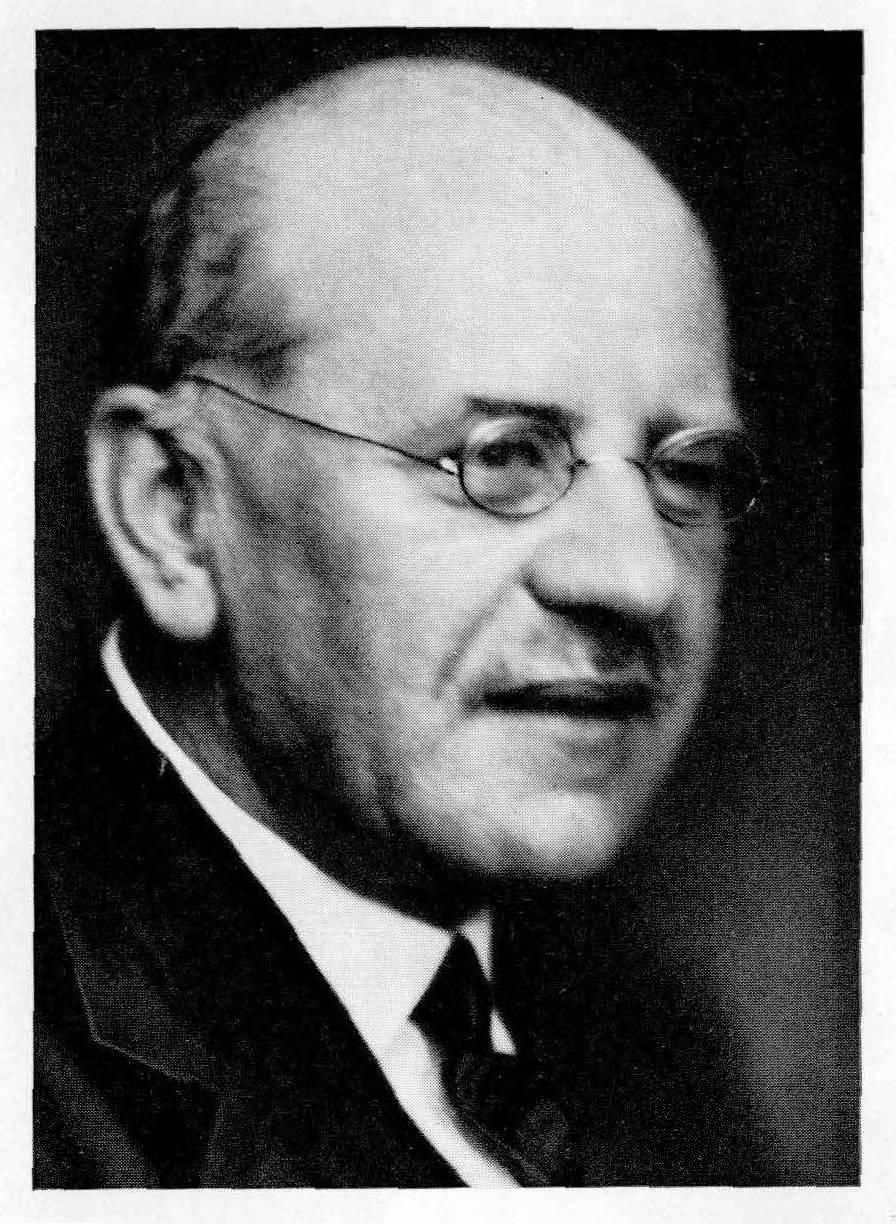
Alfred Valentin Heuß

Alfred Valentin Heuß or Heuss (27 January 1877 – 9 July 1934) was a German musicologist, music critic and editor of music magazines.

== Life ==
Born in Chur, after studying music in Stuttgart, Munich and Leipzig, Heuß received his doctorate in 1902 and was editor of the Zeitschrift der internationalen Musikgesellschaft from 1904 to 1914, and editor-in-chief of the Neue Zeitschrift für Musik from 1921 to 1929. As a music critic and music writer, Heuß published mainly on early music and on the music of the classical and romantic periods. He contributed the nineteenth volume of Denkmäler deutscher Tonkunst in editing Adam Krieger's Arien (1667).

Heuß was hostile to contemporary music, which he regarded as "un-German". Oliver Hilmes has described how Heuß developed the Zeitschrift für Musik during the Weimar Republic into a bulwark against the avant-garde and everything supposedly 'un-German'. The tendency of the journal, which can be seen especially in its reviews of contemporary works, was not based on differentiated analysis, but rather made sweeping devaluations based on stereotypical prejudices. So-called 'killer-phrases' pretended to reveal the causes of complex social crises. In reality, however, the pseudo-arguments contributed to a dogmatic division into 'good' and 'evil'. Heuß saw himself as a judge of the right of works and their creators to exist. His criticism also referred to conductors like Gustav Brecher. Musical ideology in the Nazi State was the culmination of a development that had begun long before.

Heuß' rigid national attitude was accompanied by hatred of modernity and pronounced anti-Semitism. An article in 1925 criticized Arnold Schoenberg's appointment as head of one of the three master classes for composition at the Prussian Academy of Arts in Berlin. At the outset, he made his aesthetic judgment of Schoenberg's compositions: "Every connoisseur of the circumstances, whether standing on the right or the left, knows that the time of Schoenberg's hysterical convulsions and feverish shivers in music is over, that he is heading for and must head for completely different goals, because the embodied unnaturalness cannot be taken as a principle in length." In the next step, Schoenberg's vocation turned into a national tragedy: "The test of its existence, which has already been so far assured, will cost German music at least several decades, and its source will continue to flow murky for a long time to come, because specifically Jewish forces, for the first time in its history, have taken its development into their own hands in a time of inner weakening. The Jew as a fanatical leader, who is nowhere more down-to-earth and who consciously wants to be without tradition - that means nothing else than the path to ruin."

Heuß was also a composer himself. His sons were Alfred Heuß (historian) and the national economist Ernst Heuss.

Heuß died in Gaschwitz near Leipzig at age 77.
