= Reinhard Schau =

German opera director and lecturer (1935–2019)

Reinhard Schau (8 September 1935 – 9 March 2019) was a German opera director and lecturer.

== Life ==
Born in Ełk, Schau studied opera direction with Heinz Rückert at the Staatliche Hochschule für Theater und Musik Halle (1954/55) and with Carl Riha at the Hochschule für Musik "Hanns Eisler" in (East-)Berlin (1955–59).

Until 1964, he worked as a director at the Landesbühnen Sachsen in Radebeul, where he collaborated with the dramaturge Dieter Härtwig. From 1964 to 1969, Schau was opera director at the Mecklenburgisches Staatstheater Schwerin, then opera director of the Theater Magdeburg until 1977. He staged the premieres of Dieter Nowka's opera Die Erbschaft (1960), Bill Brook and Old Fritz by Rainer Kunad (both 1965), Zimmermann's Weiße Rose (1968) and Die zweite Entscheidung (1970); the German language premiere of Prokofiev's The Story of a Real Man (1963) and the first GDR performances of Stravinski's The Rake’s Progress and Dantons Tod by Gottfried von Einem (1967).

In 1977, Schau was offered a position at the Hochschule für Musik Franz Liszt, Weimar, where he headed the opera school until 2001. In addition, he held a deputy professorship for scene studies and music theatre. In 1982, he received his doctorate from the Martin Luther University of Halle with a dissertation on singing training in the GDR. Between 1982 and 1988 he published articles in the professional journal Theater der Zeit. Schau initiated the foundation of the " Fördervereins der Musikhochschule Weimar" of the Weimar Academy of Music in 1991, which he subsequently also headed.

After his retirement, the university appointed him as its honorary senator. From 2003, he published several books: Szenen um Hugo Wolf, about the history of the Schloss Belvedere, Weimar and in particular the Musikgymnasium Schloss Belvedere and the Marie Seebach foundation in Weimar.

Stau died in Weimar at the age of 83.

== Publications ==
- Kinder des Südens. Szenen um Hugo Wolf. Hamburg 2003.
- Das Weimarer Belvedere. Eine Bildungsstätte zwischen Goethezeit und Gegenwart. Böhlau Verlag, Cologne, 2006.
- Das Musikgymnasium Schloss Belvedere in Weimar. Geschichte und Gegenwart. Böhlau Verlag, Cologne, 2010.
- Die Stiftung der Marie Seebach – Ein Altenheim für Bühnenkünstler. Since 1895 in Weimar. Böhlau Verlag, Cologne, 2015.
