= Hanne-Lore Kuhse =

German operatic soprano

Hanne-Lore Kuhse (28 March 1925 – 10 December 1999) was a German operatic soprano.

== Life and career ==
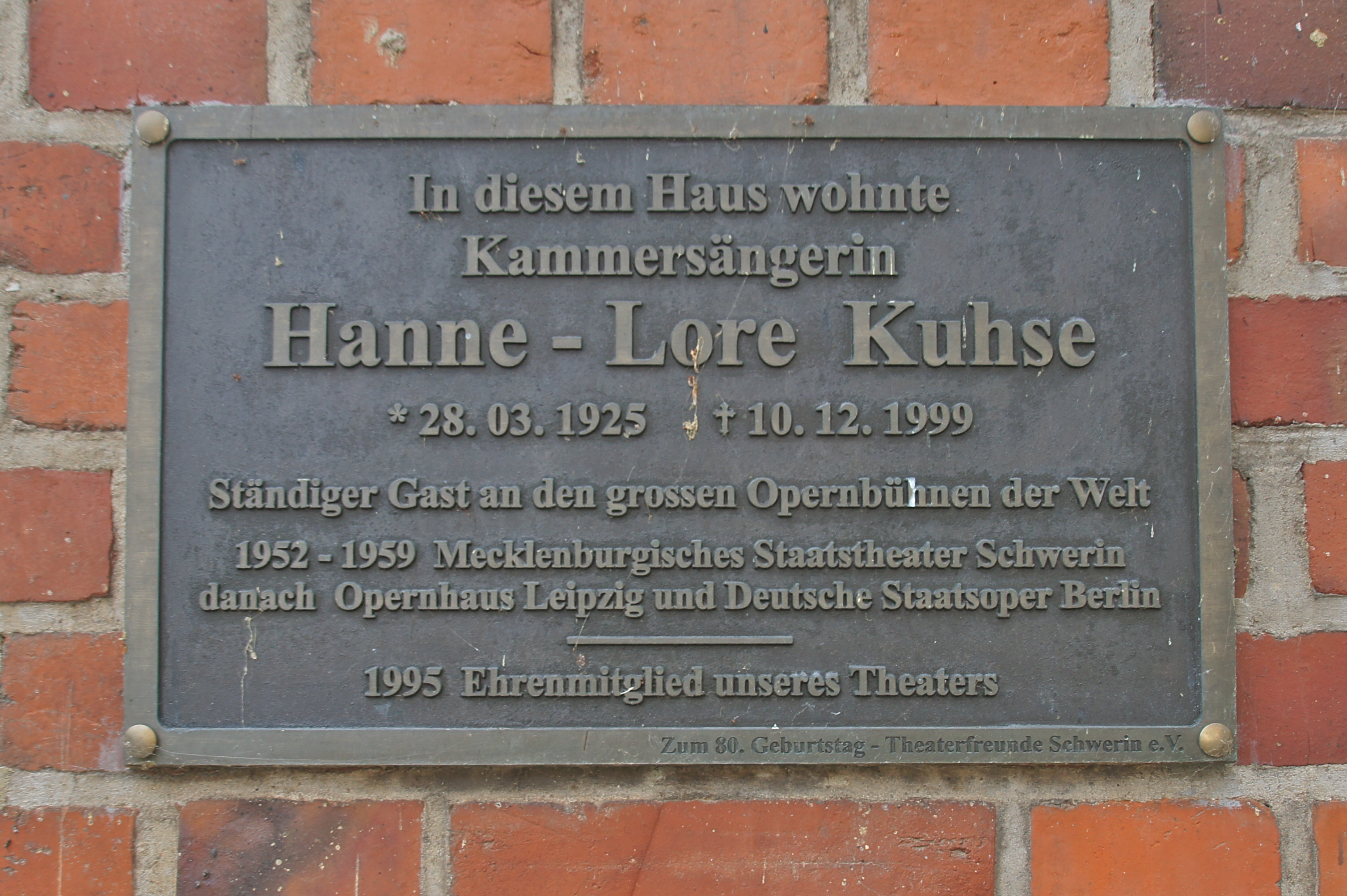
Plaque at the house in Schwerin, where the singer lived.

Born in Schwaan, Kuhse first studied singing with a private teacher in Rostock. Later she continued her education at the Rostock Conservatory and at the Stern Conservatory in Berlin.

In 1951 she made her debut at the Theater Gera as Leonore in Beethoven's Fidelio. From 1952 to 1959 she was a member of the Mecklenburg State Theatre. In 1959 she changed to the Leipzig Opera, and in 1963 she was engaged by the Berlin State Opera.

In 1973 she received a visiting professorship at the Hochschule für Musik Franz Liszt, Weimar. In 1974 she was appointed professor at the Musikhochschule Berlin. Her students included mezzo-soprano Annette Markert and baritone Erwin Noack.

Kuhse died in Berlin at age 74.

== Repertoire ==
She sang almost all roles in dramatic soprano: Donna Anna in Mozart's Don Giovanni, Leonore in Fidelio, Amelia in Un ballo in maschera and Lady Macbeth in Verdi's Macbeth, Puccini's Tosca, Senta in Der fliegende Holländer, Venus in Tannhäuser and Brünnhilde in Der Ring des Nibelungen. The highlight of her artistic activity as a singer was portraying Isolde in Wagner's Tristan und Isolde. In the field of modernity she took on Marie in A. Berg's Wozzeck.

In 1964, she appeared as Lady Macbeth in Verdi's Macbeth, directed by Erich-Alexander Winds at the Staatsoper Unter den Linden.

== Trivia ==
Kuhse was honorary citizen in Schwaan, where she is buried.
