= Klaus Harnisch =

German theatre director

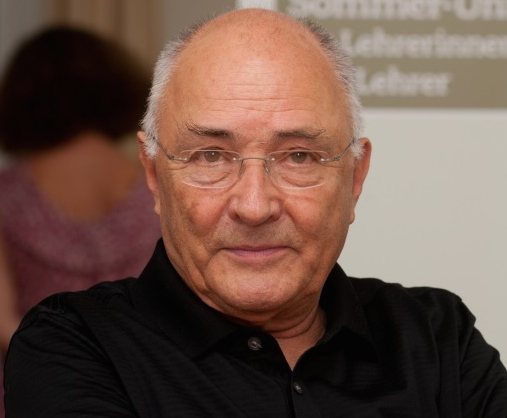
Klaus Harnisch

Klaus Harnisch (born 13 December 1933) is a German director, dramaturg and cultural manager.

== Life ==
Harness was born in Halle/Saale. After graduating from high school, he studied music theatre directing with Heinz Rückert in Halle (then Staatliche Hochschule für Theater und Musik Halle) and Carl Riha in Berlin (Deutsche Hochschule für Musik, now Hochschule für Musik "Hanns Eisler") from 1952 to 1957 and from 1972 to 1974 in distance learning cultural studies at the Humboldt-Universität zu Berlin.

From 1957, Harnisch worked as a director at various theatres in the GDR and from 1972 to 1981 as chief dramaturg of the music theatre at the Landestheater Halle (now Halle Opera House). In 1979 he wrote the libretto for the opera Büchner by Friedrich Schenker, which premiered in 1987 in the Apollo Hall of the Berlin State Opera. In the Directorate for Theatre and Orchestra at the Ministry of Culture of the GDR (DTO), he was head of the department of directors of music theatre from 1981 to 1990.

After the 1990 Peaceful Revolution, he became co-founder of the Conductors' Forum support programme of the Deutscher Musikrat in 1990 and was its managing director from 1991 to 1999. As a retiree, Harnisch developed a workshop concept for interactive conducting and from 2002 to 2015 he worked as co-founder and project representative of the rector for Das Kritische Orchester - Werkstatt für interaktives Dirigieren on a voluntary basis at the Hochschule für Musik "Hanns Eisler" Berlin. In 2016 he was appointed honorary member of the Academy of Music "Hanns Eisler" Berlin.
