= Joan Carroll (soprano) =

American operatic coloratura soprano (born 1932)

- Born: 27 July 1932 (age 93); Philadelphia, Pennsylvania, US
- Occupation: Operatic soprano

Joan Carroll (born 27 July 1932) is an American operatic coloratura soprano who appeared in the title role of Alban Berg's Lulu at the work's US premiere at the Santa Fe Opera in 1963, and often in opera houses in Europe. She premiered vocal music by Aribert Reimann and Wilhelm Killmayer, among others.

== Career ==
Born in Philadelphia, Pennsylvania, she studied first in the United States. Carroll appeared in 1951 at the Philadelphia Opera as Lucy in Menotti's The Telephone. She continued her studies in Berlin, Germany, with Margarethe von Winterfeldt. She began a career with the NBC Opera Theatre in New York in Ariadne auf Naxos by Richard Strauss in 1955. From 1959 to 1961, she was a member of the Hamburg State Opera. She married the set designer Rudolf Heinrich, who worked for Walter Felsenstein at the Komische Oper Berlin in East Berlin. When the wall was built, they fled to the West. She performed the title role of Alban Berg's Lulu at several opera houses throughout Europe, in 1962 in Hamburg and at the Staatsoper Hannover, in 1963 at the Marseille Opera, in 1966 at the Bavarian State Opera, in 1967 at the Deutsche Oper am Rhein in Düsseldorf and the Zurich Opera, in 1968 in Florence, and in 1969 in Paris and at the Aachen Opera, among others. She performed the role more than 100 times. Carroll appeared as Lulu in the work's US premiere at the Santa Fe Opera in 1963, when acts 1 and 2 were given in a set designed by Heinreich. She performed alongside Donald Gramm as Dr. Schön, Elaine Bonazzi as Countess Geschwitz, and George Shirley as Alwa, conducted by Robert Craft. Heinrich designed the staged also for a performance of the opera with Carroll in Boston by the Opera Group of Boston directed by Sarah Caldwell, opening their sixths season. Harold C. Schonberg of The New York Times wrote:

Miss Carroll was, dramatically, a perfect Lulu—sexy, provocative, very much the femme fatale. Berg conceived Lulu as an amoral (as opposed to immoral) woman who destroys every man with whom she comes in contact. Successful in portraying Lulu the mankiller, Miss Carroll was somewhat less successful in her vocal projection. She needs a smaller house in which to operate. Nevertheless, her combination of acting skill and musicianship carried the day.

She was a concert singer who sang and sometimes premiered contemporary music. In 1968, Aribert Reimann composed for her voice Inane, a monologue for soprano and orchestra setting a text by Manuel Thomas. She premiered it in Berlin on 8 January 1969, with Lukas Foss conducting the Radio-Symphonie-Orchester Berlin. She recorded it, along with Stravinsky's Three Japanese Songs and Górecki's Monologhi for soprano and three instrumental ensembles, with Aribert Reimann (piano), Gustav Scheck (flute), the Ensemble für Neue Musik, conducted by Arghyris Kounadis, and the Symphonieorchester des Bayerischen Rundfunks, conducted by Andrzej Markowski. Inane from this recording was first broadcast in the UK on 16 June 1970 by the BBC. In 1968, she premiered the song cycle Blasons anatomiques du corps féminin by Wilhelm Killmayer in Munich, with the composer as the pianist.

In 1971, she was interviewed by Rudolf Lück for a book, along with eleven male musicians, about their interactions with composers who wrote music for them. The others included the conductor and composer Michael Gielen, the oboist Heinz Holliger, and the pianists Aloys and Alfons Kontarsky. Her chapter was titled "Von der 'Königin der Nacht' zur 'Lulu')" (From the Queen of the Night to Lulu). She mentioned her vocal range of three octaves, and the flexibility demanded by composers not only for fast changes in pitch and tone colour, but also for sound other tone production such as whispering, talking and yelling.
