= Heinz Rückert =

German opera director (1904–1984)

Heinz Rückert (17 December 1904 – 14 February 1984) was a German opera director. He was one of the co-founders of the Halle Georg Friedrich Handel Renaissance.

== Life ==
Born in Darmstadt, Rückert grew up in a musical family and came into contact with the music of Johann Sebastian Bach at an early age. His great-grandfather was the poet Friedrich Rückert. He learned to play the piano autodidactically. After Abitur at a humanistic grammar school in Darmstadt, he studied German, art and theatre studies for three years in Munich, where Artur Kutscher was his most important teacher. Kutscher also brought him into contact with the repertoire of Handel, which experienced its renaissance in Göttingen in the 1920s.

In 1927, Kutscher placed him with the director Georg Hartmann, under whom he was to become assistant director in Dessau. In addition, he took part in performances at the Bauhausbühne. After that, he worked as an acting director at the Bayerische Landesbühne in Munich. In 1931, he went to Switzerland and became an acting director at the Theater St. Gallen. From 1932 till 1937 he was a director at the Oper Zürich. There, he also had his first Handel production in 1935. In the 1930s, probably rather unwanted in Switzerland, he returned to Germany. Without being a member of the Reichstheaterkammer, he was engaged as head director at the houses in Theater Bielefeld and from 1939 in the Wrocław Opera.

In 1941 he went to the Halle Opera House. In 1943, he was responsible for the first performance of Handel's Agrippina, which was arranged by Hellmuth Christian Wolff. Even after the theatre was destroyed in the course of Allied air raids on Halle, he remained connected to the city. From 1947 to 1951, he was head theatre director in Leipzig. Since 1947, Rückert was a member of the Cultural Association of the GDR. At the Staatliche Hochschule für Theater und Musik Halle, he became a professor in 1951 and was head of the opera direction department, a course of study established for the first time in Germany. Among his students were Klaus Harnisch, Reinhard Schau and Stephan Stompor. He then became opera director at the newly built Theater des Friedens in Halle. He built up a Handel collective, for which he brought the conductor Horst-Tanu Margraf and the stage designer Rudolf Heinrich to Halle. From 1952 he regularly directed the Handel Festival, Halle, starting with Händel's Alcina. He became known for his method of through-texting, which he first tested in Handel's Deidamia in 1954. In Halle, he was largely responsible for the Handel renaissance of the 1950s.

As a representative of music theatre, he was brought to Berlin in 1955 by Walter Felsenstein. He was there until 1958 engaged as director and head of the young talent studio at the Komische Oper Berlin. From 1959, Rückert worked at the Staatsoper Unter den Linden. After Hans Pischner took over as director of the Staatsoper in 1963 and set other priorities, Rückert concentrated on guest productions in Leipzig and Frankfurt/Oder. For a production at the Dresden Semperoper in 1964, he was probably not granted a leave of absence. In 1965, he was again appointed opera director in Halle for two years, succeeding Wolfgang Gubisch. Musicology and music criticism, however, turned to new ways of performance, so that he withdrew more and more artistically even in the course of an illness.

Rückert staged a total of sixteen Handel operas. His Wolfgang Amadeus Mozart and Ermanno Wolf-Ferrari opera productions were also significant. He directed Telemann's Pimpinone, Tchaikovsky's The Enchantres and Pfitzner's Das Christ-Elflein. His repertoire also included modern operas like Hindemith's Cardillac and Blacher's The Flood. In 1948, Rückert staged the premiere of the chamber opera Die Nachtschwalbe by Boris Blacher.

Most recently Rückert lived with his wife near the Berlin Alexanderplatz, where he died in 1984 at the age of 79.

== Awards ==
- 1957: Nationalpreis der DDR III. Klasse für Kunst und Literatur (im Kollektiv der Händelfestspiele)
- 1964: Handel Prize
- 1965: Vaterländischer Verdienstorden in Bronze
- 1979: Ehrenmitglied der Staatsoper Unter den Linden
