= Oliver Hilmes =

German author of historical biographies (born 1971)

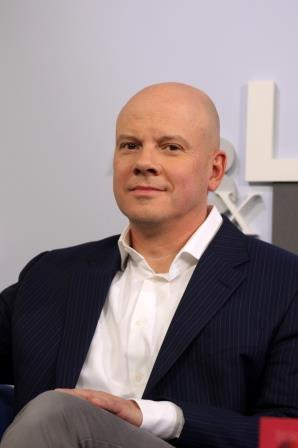

Oliver Hilmes (born 1971) is a German author who has written several historical biographies. His study of Cosima Wagner, the daughter of the 19th century composer Franz Liszt, and his biography of Alma Mahler, the Viennese-born composer, author, editor, and socialite, have been translated into English. His book about the 1936 Olympic Games in Berlin was translated into numerous languages and received literary awards.

== Education ==
Hilmes was born in Viersen, Germany. He completed his doctorate with Christoph Kleßmann on the history of the twentieth century and has worked for the Berliner Philharmoniker Foundation since 2002. As personal advisor to the artistic director Franz Xaver Ohnesorg, he was involved in the introduction of the Berliner Philharmoniker's education programme and the transformation of the orchestra into a foundation. Today he works for the Berliner Philharmoniker Foundation as editor-in-chief of the Phil magazine and as curator for special projects.

== Career ==
Hilmes has written biographies of Alma Mahler-Werfel, Cosima Wagner, Franz Liszt and Bavarian King Ludwig II. His book about the 1936 Berlin Olympics was selected as a Book of the Year by the Financial Times and The Guardian. Tilman Krause, the literary critic of the German daily newspaper Die Welt, wrote of him in 2007, "Er ist das Wunderkind unter den deutschen Biografen" ("He is the Wunderkind among German biographers").

Hilmes is on the board of the Karg-Elert Society, and between 1996 and 2013 was its executive director; the society promotes the study of the artistic and academic works of composer and music theoretician Sigfrid Karg-Elert.

In 2016, Hilmes discovered the residency card of Richard Friedländer, a German Jew, in Berlin's residence archives, which possibly hints at Magda Goebbels being his biological daughter.

== Awards ==
- 2008: Geisteswissenschaften International – Preis zur Förderung der Übersetzung geisteswissenschaftlicher Literatur for: Herrin des Hügels. Das Leben der Cosima Wagner (Siedler)
- 2013: Grand Prix des Muses (prix spécial du jury) for: Cosima Wagner. La maîtresse de la colline (Éditions Perrin)
- 2018: William Hill Sports Book of the Year (Shortlist) for: Berlin 1936. Sixteen Days in August (The Bodley Head)
- 2019: The Sporting Club General Outstanding Book of the Year 2019 for: Berlin 1936. Sixteen Days in August

== Publications ==
- Ein Ende und ein Anfang: Wie der Sommer 45 die Welt veränderte. Siedler, Munich 2025, ISBN 978-3827501899
- Schattenzeit. Deutschland 1943: Alltag und Abgründe. Siedler, Munich 2023, ISBN 978-3-8275-0159-2
- Das Verschwinden des Dr. Mühe. Eine Kriminalgeschichte aus dem Berlin der 30er Jahre. Penguin Books, Munich 2020, ISBN 978-3-328-60138-8
- Berlin 1936. Sixteen Days in August. Other Press, New York 2018, ISBN 978-1590519295, originally published as Berlin 1936. Sechzehn Tage im August. Siedler, Munich 2016, ISBN 978-3-8275-0059-5
- Malevolent Muse: The Life of Alma Mahler. Northeastern University Press, 2015, ISBN 978-1555537890
- Cosima Wagner: The Lady of Bayreuth. Yale University Press, 2010, ISBN 0300152159
- Ludwig II: Der unzeitgemäße König. Siedler, Munich 2013, ISBN 978-388680-898-4
- Liszt: Musician, Celebrity, Superstar. Yale University Press 2016, ISBN 978-0300182934, originally published as Liszt: Biographie eines Superstars. Siedler, Munich 2011, ISBN 978-3-88680-947-9
- Cosimas Kinder: Triumph und Tragödie der Wagner-Dynastie. Siedler, Munich 2009, ISBN 978-3-88680-899-1
- Im Fadenkreuz. Politische Gustav Mahler-Rezeption 1919–1945. Eine Studie über den Zusammenhang von Antisemitismus und Kritik an der Moderne. Peter Lang, Frankfurt 2003, ISBN 3-631-51041-1
- Der Streit ums "Deutsche". Alfred Heuß und die Zeitschrift für Musik. Von Bockel, Hamburg 2003, ISBN 3-932696-43-3
- "Mit Gustav Mahler in Viersen". In: Elke Heidenreich (Ed.), Ein Traum von Musik, 46 Liebeserklärungen. Edition Elke Heidenreich, Bertelsmann, Munich 2010, ISBN 978-3-570-58014-1
