= Der Silbersee =

1933 opera by Kurt Weill

Der Silbersee: ein Wintermärchen
- Play with music by Kurt Weill
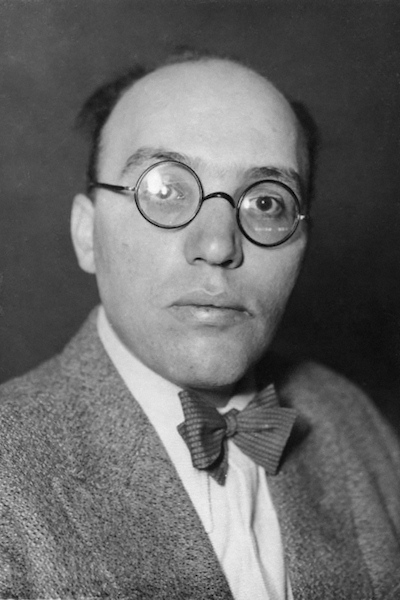
- The composer in 1932
- Translation: The Silver Lake: a Winter's Fairy Tale
- Librettist: Georg Kaiser
- Language: German
- Premiere: 18 February 1933: Altes Theater (Leipzig); Alte Oper (Erfurt); Stadttheater Magdeburg

Der Silbersee: ein Wintermärchen (The Silver Lake: a Winter's Fairy Tale) is a 'play with music' in three acts by Kurt Weill to a German text by Georg Kaiser. The subtitle is an allusion to Heinrich Heine's 1844 satirical epic poem, Germany. A Winter's Tale.

== Premiere performances ==
Der Silbersee was premiered on 18 February 1933 simultaneously at the Altes Theater (Leipzig), the Alte Oper (Erfurt) and the Stadttheater Magdeburg, just three weeks after the Nazi Party's Machtergreifung on 30 January 1933. The Leipzig production was directed by Detlev Sierck, conducted by Gustav Brecher, and designed by Caspar Neher. It was the last production of both Weill and Kaiser in the Weimar Republic before they were forced to emigrate. It was banned on 4 March 1933 by the Nazis after having been performed 16 times.

== Performance history ==
A complete performance of Der Silbersee runs about three hours, consisting of roughly equal parts of dialogue and music. The long and complex play requires skilled actors, but the vocal demands of Weill's score require trained singers. The difficulty in reconciling these needs makes successful performance of the piece difficult, and modern productions have consisted mostly of abridged concert versions and adaptations.

An abridged version with diminished orchestration was prepared by Boris Blacher and presented as part of the Berlin Festival at the Schlosspark-Theater, in West Berlin, on 19 September 1955.

At the Holland Festival at The Hague on 25 June 1971, a 90-minute concert version was prepared by Jozef Heinzelmann and David Drew. It included the entire score in its original orchestration, with narration spoken by Lotte Lenya. The performance was conducted by Gary Bertini.

A 50-minute concert version devised by David Drew for five soloists, chorus and orchestra with no narration or dialogue was presented on 10 September 1975 in West Berlin. Performers included Anja Silja (soprano) and Günther Reich (baritone), conducted by Gary Bertini.

On 20 March 1980 in the New York State Theater in New York City, the New York City Opera presented a free adaptation entitled Silverlake with an English libretto by Hugh Wheeler and a musically continuous score devised by Lys Symonette who also adapted the lyrics. The score incorporated incidental music Weill had composed for the Berlin stage as well as music written for a 1927 production of August Strindberg's Gustav III, and interpolated the "Muschel von Margate" ("Petroleum Song") (written for Léo Lania's 1928 play Konjunktur) with new lyrics by Wheeler to create a duet for Olim and Severin in act 3. This version also adds Olim to the Lottery Agent's Tango, making it a duet, transfers the "Ballad of Caesar's Death" from the ingénue Fennimore to the villainess Frau von Luber, and adds a role for a dancer representing Hunger. The cast included Joel Grey (Olim), William Neill (Severin), Elizabeth Hynes (Fennimore), Elaine Bonazzi (Frau von Luber), and Gary Chryst (Hunger). The production was directed by Harold Prince, conducted by Julius Rudel, and designed by Manuel Lutgenhorst. In 2014 it was produced at Kokkola Opera Summer in Kokkola, Finland.

== Roles ==
Roles, voice types, premiere casts
Role	Voice type	Premiere cast, 18 February 1933		
Role	Voice type	Leipzig Conductor: Gustav Brecher Director: Detlef Sierck Designer: Caspar Neher	Magdeburg Conductor: Georg Winkler Director: Helmut Götze Designer: Ernst Rufer	Erfurt Conductor: Friedrich Walter Director: Hermann Pfeiffer Designer: Walter Schröter
Severin, thief	tenor	Alexander Golling	Ernst Busch	Albert Johannes
Olim, police officer	baritone	Erhard Siedel	Eduard Wandrey	
Fennimore, Frau von Luber's niece	soprano	Lotte Lenya	Elisabeth Lennartz	Sieglinde Riesmann
Frau von Luber, Olim's housekeeper	mezzo-soprano	Lina Carstens	Ruth Baldor	
Baron Laur, Frau von Luber's friend	tenor	Ernst Satler		
Lottery agent	tenor	Albert Garbe		
First gravedigger	baritone			
Second gravedigger	baritone			
First shopgirl	soprano			
Second shopgirl	mezzo-soprano			
First young man	bass			
Second young man	bass			

== Synopsis ==
=== Act 1 ===
A band of unemployed men who live on the banks of the Silbersee are driven by their hunger and despair to rob a grocery store. Severin is making off with a pineapple when he is shot and wounded by Olim, a provincial policeman. While preparing his official report, Olim's conscience is troubled by the desperation that he imagines has motivated Severin's crime, and he is touched by Severin's unlikely choice of plunder. After an unexpected lottery win, Olim finds himself in possession of a substantial fortune. Then, he decides to destroy his police report regarding the incident and makes a solemn commitment to rectify his relationship with Severin. Olim approaches Severin, who is bitter and hospitalized, presenting himself as the benefactor without revealing his true identity.

=== Act 2 ===
Olim has purchased an ancient castle and is attending to Severin's recovery with the help of his housekeeper Frau von Luber and her good-hearted and somewhat mystical niece Fennimore. Frau von Luber is from an old aristocratic family that has fallen on hard times. Sensing that Olim is hiding some secret that she may be able to use to her advantage, she orders Fennimore to spy upon the master and his guest in an attempt to unlock the mystery of their relationship. Meanwhile, Severin is unmoved by Olim's generosity and remains morbidly focused on revenge. At Severin's request, Fennimore delivers a message to his comrades at the Silbersee, who thereby learn his whereabouts and come to the castle, where they recognize Olim as the policeman whose gunshot crippled Severin.

=== Act 3 ===
Frau von Luber now exploits Olim's fear of the furious Severin and manages to acquire both the castle and Olim's fortune. Fennimore foils her aunt's plan to set Severin murderously upon Olim by moving the two men to reconcile. Frau von Luber, now restored to wealth and property, dispossesses Olim and Severin, who set out through the snow to the Silbersee with the intention of drowning themselves. As they journey there, winter turns to spring and the voices of Fennimore and the unseen chorus encourage them to remain true to each other and to mankind by going forward in confidence and hope. When they arrive at the Silbersee, they find it miraculously still frozen solid, and they set out across it as Fennimore's voice is heard singing, Wer weiter muss, den trägt der Silbersee (Silverlake will bear whoever must go farther).

== Musical numbers ==
Overture (Allegro assai) – orchestra

Act 1

1 "Gräbst du?" – Two gravediggers
2 Alla marche funebre: "Wir tragen den Toten zu Grabe" – Two gravediggers, two young men
3 "Der Bäkker bäckt ums Morgenrot" – Severin, two gravediggers, two young men
4 Song der beiden Verkäuferinnen: "Wir sind Mädchen, die an jedermann verkaufen" – Two shopgirls
4a Walzer – orchestra
5 Choruses

Sostenuto – orchestra
"Olim! Tut es dir nicht leid?" – chorus
"Jetzt bist du auf dem Wege" – chorus
"Wenn die nicht schiltst" – chorus
"Immer weiter dringen" – chorus
"Noch hast du das Geld nicht'"– chorus

6 Song von der Krone des Gewinns: "Was zahlen Sie für einen Rat?" – Lottery agent
6a Choruses

"Olim! was willst du tun?" – chorus
"Olim! Willst du Vergessen?" – chorus
"Du hast dich zum Aufbruch entschlossen" – chorus
Nachspiel – orchestra

[7a] Melodrama – Severin
7 "Was soll ich essen in der Morgenfrühe?" – Severin, Olim

Act 2

[8a] Moderato assai – orchestra
8 Fennimores Lied: "Ich bin eine arme Verwandte" – Fennimore
9 Ballade von Cäsars Tod: "Rom hiess eine Stadt" – Fennimore
10 Allegro moderato – orchestra [Fennimore's dance]
11 Rache-Arie: "Erst trifft dich die Kugel" – Severin
12 Silbersee-Duett: "Auf jener Straße" – Severin, Fennimore
12a Choral reprise of 11

Act 3

13 Allegro assai – orchestra (shortened reprise of 1a)
14 Odysseus-Arie: "Wie Odysseus an den Mast des Schiffes" – Severin
15 Totentanz – orchestra
15a Schlaraffenland-Song: "Es wächst uns in den Mund der Wein" – Frau von Luber, Baron Laur
16 Finale

Andantino – orchestra
"Ihr sollt den Weg nicht finden" – chorus
Allegretto – orchestra
"Alles, was ist, ist Beginnen" – Fennimore's voice, chorus

== Music ==
The theatrical form of Der Silbersee is difficult to classify and most closely resembles a singspiel, though with greater dramatic demands placed on the acting.

As in his other works, Weill uses a broad variety of forms (songs, arias, duets, quartets, choruses), musical styles (tango, funeral march, waltz, polka, foxtrot, march) and conventions (revenge aria, moritat, Totentanz, and dialogue spoken over elaborate musical accompaniment, i.e., melodrama). The orchestration requires a string section plus 13 other instruments.

The finale, depicting Severin and Olim's journey to the Silbersee through a stormy snowscape that transforms into spring, runs approximately 15 minutes and consists of melodrama, dialogue, instrumental passages, choruses, and an offstage solo.

== Reception and consequences ==
As a result of the work's questioning of genre limitations, the Nazis labelled it Entartete Musik and placed a ban on the piece on 4 March 1933. The next day, Kaiser was expelled from the Prussian Academy of Arts, of which he was a member.

On 21 March, Silbersee designer and longtime Weill collaborator Caspar Neher and his wife Erika drove Weill across the border in their car and together they headed for Paris.

On 10 May the work with illustrations by Neher was burned on the Opera Plaza. In spite of the extreme censorship put on it at the time, the work has survived more or less intact. There have been complete recordings and performances made of it most since 1945.

== Recordings ==
- Silverlake. A Winter's Tale, New York City Opera. Conductor: Julius Rudel. Elektra/Asylum/Nonesuch, 1980 (102 minutes)
- Der Silbersee. Ein Wintermärchen – Kurt Weill Edition, vol. 1, Capriccio, 1990 (107 minutes)
- Weill: Der Silbersee, Markus Stenz (conductor), London Sinfonietta Orchestra and Chorus, RCA, Red Seal Label, 1999 (85 minutes)
