= Rise and Fall of the City of Mahagonny =

Political-satirical opera composed by Kurt Weill to a German libretto by Bertolt Brecht

Aufstieg und Fall der Stadt Mahagonny
- Political-satirical opera by Kurt Weill
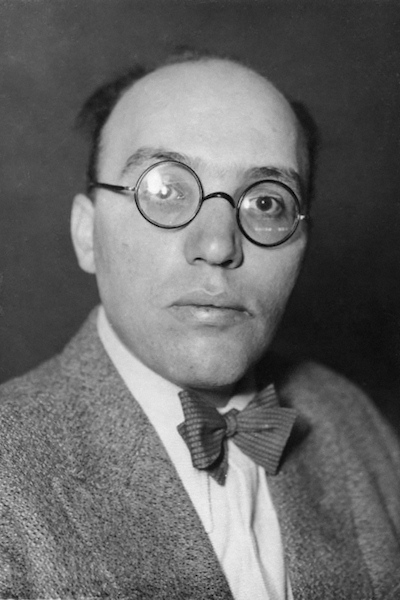
- Weill in 1932
- Translation: Rise and Fall of the City of Mahagonny
- Librettist: Bertolt Brecht and Elisabeth Hauptmann
- Language: German
- Premiere: 9 March 1930; Neues Theater, Leipzig

Rise and Fall of the City of Mahagonny (German: Aufstieg und Fall der Stadt Mahagonny) is a political-satirical opera composed by Kurt Weill to a German libretto by Bertolt Brecht and Elisabeth Hauptmann. It was first performed on 9 March 1930 at the Neues Theater in Leipzig.

Some interpreters have viewed the play as a critique of American society. Others have perceived it as a critique of the chaotic and immoral Weimar Republic, particularly Berlin of the 1920s with its rampant prostitution, unstable government, political corruption, and economic crises.

== Composition history ==
Weill was asked by the 1927 Baden-Baden music festival committee to write a one-act chamber opera for the festival. He ended up writing Mahagonny-Songspiel, sometimes known as Das kleine Mahagonny, a concert work commissioned for voices and a small orchestra. The work was written in May 1927, and performed in June. It consisted of eleven numbers, including "Alabama Song" and "Benares Song".

Weill, Brecht, and Hauptmann continued to rework the material into a full-length opera, which had its premiere in Leipzig on 9 March 1930 and played in Berlin in December of the following year. The opera was banned by the Nazis in 1933 and did not have a significant production until the 1960s.

Weill's score uses a number of styles, including ragtime, jazz and formal counterpoint. The "Alabama Song" has been interpreted by a range of artists, notably The Doors, David Bowie, and Ute Lemper.

== Language ==
Lyrics for both "Alabama Song" and "Benares Song" are in English (albeit specifically idiosyncratic English) and are performed in that language even when the opera is staged in its original German.

A few lines of the briefly interpolated song, "Asleep in the Deep" (1897), lyrics by Arthur J. Lamb, music by H. W. Petrie, referred to in the opera by its opening words, "Stürmisch die Nacht " or "Stormy the Deep", are sung in the German version of the song, composed on verses of Martell, under the title "Des Seemanns Los" (The Sailor's Fate), when the opera is sung in the original German.

Although the name of the city itself sounds like the English word mahogany and its German-language equivalent, Mahagoni, the character Leokadja Begbick states that it means "City of Nets" (Note: Act 1, scene: Begbick: "Darum lasst uns hier eine Stadt gründen und sie nennen Mahagonny, das heißt: Netzestadt! ... Sie soll sein wie ein Netz, das für die essbaren Vögel gestellt wird." [Therefore let us here found a city und name it Mahagonny, which means: city of nets! It shall be like a net that is set for edible birds.]) while Brecht stated that it was a made-up word.

== Performance history ==
The opera has played in opera houses around the world. Never achieving the popularity of Weill and Brecht's The Threepenny Opera, Mahagonny is still considered a work of stature with a haunting score. Herbert Lindenberger in his book Opera in History, for example, views Mahagonny alongside Schoenberg's Moses und Aron as indicative of the two poles of modernist opera.

Following the Leipzig premiere, the opera was presented in Berlin in December 1931 at the Theater am Schiffbauerdamm conducted by Alexander von Zemlinsky with Lotte Lenya as Jenny, Trude Hesterberg as Begbick, and Harald Paulsen as Jimmy. Another production was presented in January 1934 in Copenhagen at the Det Ny Teater. Other productions within Europe waited until the end of the Second World War, some notable ones being in January 1963 in London at Sadler's Wells Opera conducted by Colin Davis and in Berlin in September 1977 by the Komische Oper.

The North American premiere of the opera was given at the Stratford Festival in Canada in 1965 in a production staged by Jean Gascon with Martha Schlamme as Jenny, Jean Bonhomme as Fatty the Bookkeeper, and Muriel Costa-Greenspon as Leokadja Begbick. It was not presented in the United States until 1970, when a short-lived April production at the Phyllis Anderson Theatre off Broadway starred Barbara Harris as Jenny, Frank Porretta as Jimmy, and Estelle Parsons as Begbick. It was then presented in Boston in 1973 under the direction of Sarah Caldwell.

The first university production in the US was in 1973 at UC Berkeley, directed by Jean-Bernard Bucky and Michael Senturia.

A full version was presented at the Yale Repertory Theatre in New Haven, Connecticut, in 1974, with Gilbert Price as Jimmy and Stephanie Cotsirilos as Jenny. Kurt Kasznar played Moses. The libretto was performed in an original translation by Michael Feingold; the production was directed by Alvin Epstein. In October 1978, Yale presented a "chamber version" adapted and directed by Keith Hack, with John Glover as Jimmy and June Gable as Begbick. Mark Linn-Baker played Fatty; Michael Gross was Trinity Moses. In November 1979, Mahagonny debuted at the Metropolitan Opera in a John Dexter production conducted by James Levine. The cast included Teresa Stratas as Jenny, Astrid Varnay as Begbick, Richard Cassilly as Jimmy, Cornell MacNeil as Moses, Ragnar Ulfung as Fatty and Paul Plishka as Joe. The production was televised in 1979 and was released on DVD in 2010. This production was streamed through the Met Opera on Demand platform on 12 December 2020 and 3-4 July 2021.

In 1985 the opera was staged at the Wexford Festival Opera with Sherry Zannoth as Jenny. The Los Angeles Opera presented the opera in September 1989 under conductor Kent Nagano and with a Jonathan Miller production. Other notable productions in Europe from the 1980s included the March 1986 presentation by the Scottish Opera in Glasgow; a June 1990 production in Florence by the Maggio Musicale Fiorentino. In October 1995 and 1997, the Paris Opera staged by Graham Vick, under the baton of Jeffrey Tate starring Marie McLaughlin as Jenny, Felicity Palmer (1995) and Kathryn Harries (1997) as Begbick, and Kim Begley (1995)/Peter Straka (1997) as Jimmy.

The July 1998 Salzburg Festival production featured Catherine Malfitano as Jenny, Gwyneth Jones as Begbick, and Jerry Hadley as Jimmy. The Vienna State Opera added it to its repertoire in January 2012 in a production by Jérôme Deschamps conducted by Ingo Metzmacher starring Christopher Ventris as Jimmy and Angelika Kirchschlager as Jenny, notably casting young mezzo-soprano Elisabeth Kulman as Begbick, breaking the tradition of having a veteran soprano (like Varnay or Jones) or musical theater singer (like Patti LuPone) perform the role.

Productions within the US have included those in November 1998 by the Lyric Opera of Chicago directed by David Alden. Catherine Malfitano repeated her role as Jenny, while Felicity Palmer sang Begbick, and Kim Begley sang the role of Jimmy. The Los Angeles Opera's February 2007 production directed by John Doyle and conducted by James Conlon included Audra McDonald as Jenny, Patti LuPone as Begbick, and Anthony Dean Griffey as Jimmy. This production was recorded on DVD, and subsequently won the 2009 Grammy Awards for "Best Classical Album" and "Best Opera Recording."

In 2014 it was performed using an alternate libretto as a "wrestling opera" at the Oakland Metro by the performers of Hoodslam.

A major new production had its world premiere in July 2019 at the Aix-en-Provence Festival in France conducted by Esa-Pekka Salonen with stage direction by Ivo van Hove. It is a co-production of Dutch National Opera, Metropolitan Opera, Opera Ballet Vlaanderen, and Les Theatres De La Ville De Luxembourg.

In 2026 the English National Opera produced a version in English at the London Coliseum with mezzo-soprano Rosie Aldridge as Leokadia Begbick, tenor Mark Le Brocq as Fatty, bass Kenneth Kellogg as Trinity Moses, soprano Danielle de Niese as Jenny Smith, and tenor Simon O'Neill as Jimmy Mahoney (called Jimmy MacIntyre in this production). It was directed by Jamie Manton and conducted by André de Ridder.

== Roles ==
Roles, voice types, premiere cast
| Role | Voice type | Premiere cast, 9 March 1930 Conductor: Gustav Brecher |
|---|---|---|
| Leokadja Begbick, a fugitive | mezzo-soprano | Marga Dannenberg |
| Dreieinigkeitsmoses (Trinity Moses), another fugitive | baritone | Walther Zimmer |
| Fatty der Prokurist (Fatty the Bookkeeper), a third fugitive | tenor | Hanns Fleischer |
| Jimmy Mahoney (Jimmy MacIntyre), an Alaskan lumberjack | tenor | Paul Beinert |
| Sparbüchsenbilly (Bank-Account Billy), Jimmy's friend | baritone | Theodor Horand |
| Jacob Schmidt (Jack O'Brien), Jimmy's friend | tenor | Hanns Hauschild |
| Joe, called Alaskawolfjoe, Jimmy's friend | bass | Ernst Osterkamp |
| Jenny Smith, a whore | soprano | Mali Trummer |
| Toby Higgins | tenor | Alfred Holländer |
| An announcer | | |

== Synopsis ==
=== Act 1 ===
Scene 1: A desolate no-man's land

A truck breaks down. Three fugitives from justice get out and find themselves in the middle of nowhere: Fatty the Bookkeeper, Trinity Moses, and Leocadia Begbick. Because the federal agents pursuing them will not search this far north, and they are in a good location to attract ships coming south from the Alaskan gold fields, Begbick decides that they can profit by staying where they are and founding a pleasure city, the city of Mahagonny, where men can have fun, because there is nothing else in the world to rely on.

Alabama Song
Excerpt from the "Alabama Song" as sung in act 1, scene 2

Scene 2

The news of Mahagonny spreads quickly, and sharks from all over flock to the bait, including the whore Jenny Smith, who is seen, with six other girls, singing the "Alabama Song", in which she waves goodbye to her home and sets out in pursuit of whiskey, dollars and pretty boys.

Scene 3

In the big cities, where men lead boring, purposeless lives, Fatty and Moses spread the gospel of Mahagonny, city of gold, among the disillusioned.

Scene 4

Four Alaskan Lumberjacks who have shared hard times together in the timberlands and made their fortunes set off together for Mahagonny. Jimmy Mahoney and his three friends – Jacob Schmidt, Bank Account Billy, and Alaska Wolf Joe – sing of the pleasures awaiting them in "Off to Mahagonny", and look forward to the peace and pleasure they will find there.

Scene 5

The four friends arrive in Mahagonny, only to find other disappointed travelers already leaving. Begbick, well-informed about their personal tastes, marks down her prices, but for the penurious Billy, they still seem too high. Jimmy impatiently calls for the girls of Mahagonny to show themselves, so he can make a choice. Begbick suggests Jenny as the right girl for Jack, who finds her rates too high. She pleads with Jack to reconsider ("Havana Song"), which arouses Jim's interest, and he chooses her. Jenny and the girls sing a tribute to "the Jimmys from Alaska."

Scene 6

Jimmy and Jenny get to know one another as she asks him to define the terms of their contact: Does he wish her to wear her hair up or down, to wear fancy underwear or none at all? "What is your wish?" asks Jim, but Jenny evades answering.

Scene 7

Begbick, Fatty, and Moses meet to discuss the pleasure city's financial crisis: People are leaving in droves, and the price of whiskey is sinking rapidly. Begbick suggests going back to civilization, but Fatty reminds her that the federal agents have been inquiring for her in nearby Pensacola. Money would solve everything, declares Begbick, and she decides to soak the four new arrivals for all they've got.

Scene 8

Jimmy, restless, attempts to leave Mahagonny because he misses the wife he left in Alaska.

Scene 9

In front of the Rich Man's Hotel, Jimmy and the others sit lazily as a pianist plays Tekla Bądarzewska's "A Maiden's Prayer". With growing anger, Jimmy sings of how his hard work and suffering in Alaska have led only to this. Drawing a knife, he shouts for Begbick, while his friends try to disarm him and the other men call to have him thrown out. Calm again, he tells Begbick that Mahagonny can never make people happy: it has too much peace and quiet.

Scene 10

As if in answer to Jimmy's complaint, the city is threatened by a hurricane. Everyone sings in horror of the destruction awaiting them.

Scene 11

Tensely, people watch for the hurricane's arrival. The men sing a hymn-like admonition not to be afraid. Jim meditatively compares Nature's savagery to the far greater destructiveness of Man. Why do we build, he asks, if not for the pleasure of destroying? Since Man can outdo any hurricane, fear makes no sense. For the sake of human satisfaction, nothing should be forbidden: If you want another man's money, his house or his wife, knock him down and take it; do what you please. As Begbick and the men ponder Jimmy's philosophy, Fatty and Moses rush in with news: The hurricane has unexpectedly struck Pensacola, destroying Begbick's enemies, the federal agents. Begbick and her cohorts take it as a sign that Jimmy is right; they join him, Jenny, and his three friends in singing a new, defiant song: If someone walks over someone else, then it's me, and if someone gets walked on, then it's you. In the background, the men continue to chant their hymn as the hurricane draws nearer.

=== Act 2 ===
Scene 12

Magically, the hurricane bypasses Mahagonny, and the people sing in awe of their miraculous rescue. This confirms Begbick's belief in the philosophy of "Do what you want," and she proceeds to put it into effect.

Jacob Schmidt's departure
Jacob Schmidt is gorging himself on food and is about to die in act 2, scene 13

Scene 13 at the renovated "Do It" tavern.

The men sing of the four pleasures of life: Eating, Lovemaking, Fighting, and Drinking. First comes eating: To kitschy cafe music, Jimmy's friend Jacob gorges until he keels over and dies. The men sing a chorale over his body, saluting "a man without fear".

Scene 14: Loving.

While Begbick collects money and issues tips on behavior, Moses placates the impatient men queuing to make love to Jenny and the other whores. The men sing the "Mandalay Song", warning that love does not last forever, and urging those ahead of them to make it snappy.

Scene 15: Fighting.

The men flock to see a boxing match between Trinity Moses and Jim's friend Alaska Wolf Joe. While most of the men, including the ever-cautious Billy, bet on the burly Moses, Jim, out of friendship, bets heavily on Joe. The match is manifestly unfair; Moses not only wins but kills Joe in knocking him out.

Scene 16: Drinking.

In an effort to shake off the gloom of Joe's death, Jimmy invites everyone to have a drink on him. The men sing "Life in Mahagonny", describing how one could live in the city for only five dollars a day, but those who wanted to have fun always needed more. Jim, increasingly drunk, dreams of sailing back to Alaska. He takes down a curtain rod for a mast and climbs on the pool table, pretending it is a ship; Jenny and Billy play along. Jimmy is abruptly sobered up when Begbick demands payment for the whiskey as well as for the damage to her property. Totally broke, he turns in a panic to Jenny, who explains her refusal to help him out in the song "Make your own bed" – an adaptation of the ideas he proclaimed at the end of act 1. Jim is led off in chains as the chorus, singing another stanza of "Life in Mahagonny", returns to its pastimes. Trinity Moses assures the crowd that Jimmy will pay for his crimes with his life.

Scene 17

At night, Jim alone and chained to a lamppost sings a plea for the sun not to rise on the day of his impending trial.

=== Act 3 ===
Scene 18: In the courtroom

Moses, like a carnival barker, sells tickets to the trials. He serves as prosecutor, Fatty as defense attorney, Begbick as judge. First comes the case of Toby Higgins, accused of premeditated murder for the purpose of testing an old revolver. Fatty invites the injured party to rise, but no one does so, since the dead do not speak. Toby bribes all three, and as a result, Begbick dismisses the case. Next Jimmy's case is called. Chained, he is led in by Billy, from whom he tries to borrow money; Billy of course refuses, despite Jim's plea to remember their time together in Alaska. In virtually the same speech he used to attack Higgins, Moses excoriates him for not paying his bills, for seducing Jenny (who presents herself as a plaintiff) to commit a "carnal act" with him for money, and for inciting the crowd with "an illegal joyous song" on the night of the typhoon. Billy, with the chorus's support, counters that, in committing the latter act, Jimmy discovered the laws by which Mahagonny lives. Moses argues that Jim hastened his friend Joe's death in a prizefight by betting on him, and Billy counters by asking who actually killed Joe. Moses does not reply. But there is no answer for the main count against him. Jim gets short sentences for his lesser crimes, but for having no money, he is sentenced to death. Begbick, Fatty, and Moses, rising to identify themselves as the injured parties, proclaim "in the whole human race / there is no greater criminal / than a man without money". As Jim is led off to await execution, everyone sings the "Benares Song", in which they long for that exotic city "where the sun is shining." But Benares has been destroyed by an earthquake. "Where shall we go?" they ask.

Scene 19: At the gallows

Jim says a tender goodbye to Jenny, who, dressed in white, declares herself his widow. He surrenders her to Billy, his last remaining companion from Alaska. When he tries to delay the execution by reminding the people of Mahagonny that God exists, they play out for him, under Moses' direction, the story of "God in Mahagonny", in which the Almighty condemns the town and is overthrown by its citizens, who declare that they can not be sent to Hell because they are already in Hell. Jim, chastened, asks only for a glass of water, but is refused even this as Moses gives the signal for the trap to be sprung.

Scene 20

A caption advises that, after Jim's death, increasing hostility among the city's various factions has caused the destruction of Mahagonny. To a potpourri of themes from earlier in the opera, groups of protesters are seen on the march, in conflict with one another, while the city burns in the background. Jenny and the whores carry Jim's clothing and accessories like sacred relics; Billy and several men carry his coffin. In a new theme, they and the others declare, "Nothing you can do will help a dead man". Begbick, Fatty, and Moses appear with placards of their own, joining the entire company in its march and declaring "Nothing will help him or us or you now," as the opera ends in chaos.

== Musical numbers ==
=== Act 1 ===
- Scene 1: Gesucht werden Leokadja Begbick ("The Desired Progress of Leocadia Begbick")
- Scene 1: Sie soll sein wie ein Netz ("It Should Be Made Like a Net")
- Scene 2: Rasch wuchs ("Growing Up Quickly" ) / Moon of Alabama ("Oh, Show Us The Way...")
- Scene 3: Die Nachricht ("The News")
- Scene 4: In den nächsten Tagen ("In the Next Few Days")
- Scene 5: Damals kam unter Anderen ("Among the Crowd There Came")
- Scene 5: Heraus, ihr Schönen von Mahagonny ("Come Out, You Beauties of Mahagonny")
- Scene 5: Ach, bedenken Sie ("Oh Worries")
- Scene 6: Ich habe gelernt ("I Have Learned")
- Scene 7: Alle großen Unternehmungen ("All Great Things")
- Scene 7: Auch ich bin einmal ("Also I Was Once")
- Scene 8: Alle wahrhaft Suchenden ("All Seekers of the Truth")
- Scene 8: Aber etwas fehlt ("But Something is Missing")
- Scene 9: Das ist die ewige Kunst ("That is the Eternal Art")
- Scene 9: Sieben Jahre ("Seven Years!")
- Scene 10: Ein Taifun! ("A Typhoon!")
- Scene 11: In dieser Nacht des Entsetzens ("In This Night of Terror")
- Scene 11: Nein, jetzt sage ich ("No, I Say Do It Now")
- Scene 11: So tuet nur, was euch beliebt ("So, Just Do What You Like")

=== Act 2 ===
- Scene 12: Hurrikan bewegt ("The Eventful Hurricane")
- Scene 12: O wunderbare Lösung! ("O Wonderful Result!")
- Scene 13: Von nun an war der Leitspruch ("From Then On The Motto Was...")
- Scene 13: Jetzt hab ich gegessen zwei Kälber ("Now I Have Eaten Two Calves")
- Scene 14: Zweitens kommt die Liebe dran! ("Secondly Comes Being in Love")
- Scene 14: Sieh jene Kraniche ("Look at Those Cranes") / The Duet of the Cranes
- Scene 14: Erstens, vergesst nicht, kommt das Fressen ("Firstly, Don't Forget, Comes the Eating")
- Scene 15: Wir, meine Herren ("We, My Dear Sirs...")
- Scene 15: Dreimal hoch, Dreieinigkeitsmoses! ("Three Cheers for Trinity Moses!")
- Scene 16: Freunde, kommt, ich lade euch ein ("Friends, Come, I Summon You")
- Scene 16: Meine Herren, meine Mutter prägte ("My Dear Sirs, My Mother Impressed [Upon Me]")
- Scene 17: Wenn der Himmel hell wird ("When the Sky is Bright")

=== Act 3 ===
- Scene 18: Haben all Zuschauer Billete? ("Do All The Gawkers Have Tickets?")
- Scene 18: Zweitens der Fall des Jimmy Mahoney ("Secondly, the Case of Jimmy Mahoney")
- Scene 19: In dieser Zeit gab es in Mahagonny ("In This Time It Was In Mahagonny")
- Scene 20: Hinrichtung und Tod des Jimmy Mahoney ("The Execution and Death of Jimmy Mahoney")
- Scene 20: Erstens, vergesst nicht, kommt das Fressen ("Firstly, Don't Forget, Comes the Eating")
- Scene 21: Wollt ihr mich denn wirklich hinrichten? ("Do You Really Want Me to Be Executed After All?")
- Scene 21: In diesen Tagen fanden in Mahagonny ("To This Day Found In Mahagonny")

== In other media ==
The opera influenced Harry Everett Smith in his 1970-1980 film Mahagonny, which features Allen Ginsberg and Patti Smith.

The 2005 movie Manderlay, directed by Lars von Trier, contains several references to the plot of Mahagonny. The most notable of these is the threat of a hurricane approaching the city during the first act. Von Trier's earlier movie Dogville, to which Manderlay is a sequel, was in large part based on a song from Brecht's Threepenny Opera ("Pirate Jenny"). In the brothel scene in act 2 of Mahagonny, the choir sings a "Song von Mandelay". The play Happy End (1929) by Elisabeth Hauptmann, Brecht and Weill, also contains a song called "Der Song von Mandelay", which uses the same refrain as in the brothel scene of Mahagonny. Brecht's use of the name Mandelay/Mandalay was inspired by Rudyard Kipling's poem "Mandalay".

== Recordings ==
- 1956: Lotte Lenya, Wilhelm Brückner-Rüggeberg (Sony 1990; originally recorded 1956)
- 1979: DVD, James Levine; John Dexter, stage director; Teresa Stratas, Astrid Varnay, Richard Cassilly; Metropolitan Opera
- 1985: Anja Silja, Jan Latham-Koenig (Capriccio 1988; recorded in 1985)
- 1997: DVD 1997, Salzburg Festival
- 2007: DVD Los Angeles Opera, starring Audra McDonald, Patti LuPone, and Anthony Dean Griffey. This recording won two 2009 Grammy Awards for Best Opera Recording and Best Classical Album. It was screened on TV as part of PBS' Great Performances
- 2010: Teatro Real (Madrid), starring Measha Brueggergosman, Jane Henschel, Michael König and Willard White, conducted by Pablo Heras-Casado and staged by La Fura dels Baus. (DVD and Blu-ray Bel Air Classiques 2011; filmed in 2010)

== Cover versions of songs ==
"Alabama Song" has been covered by many artists, notably The Doors, David Bowie, and Ute Lemper.
