= Robert Hanell =

German composer and conductor

Robert Hanell (2 March 1925 – 14 March 2009) was a German conductor and composer.

== Life ==
Born in Tschoschl, Czechoslovakia, Hanell, who originally wanted to become a teacher of ancient languages, took private music lessons with H. Zitterbart in Teplice, where he worked as répétiteur and choir conductor from 1943. In 1944 he became musical director in Meiningen and held the same position from 1945 to 1948 at the Zwickauer Theater and from 1948 to 1950 at the Bühnen der Stadt Gera. In 1952 Hanell became municipal music director in Görlitz, before he was appointed first Kapellmeister at the Komische Oper Berlin by Walter Felsenstein in 1955. In 1965 he took over as chief conductor of the Großes Rundfunkorchester Berlin. He was also a permanent guest conductor at the Berlin State Opera, the Leipzig Opera, the Semperoper and the Chemnitz Opera. Guest appearances have taken him to Munich, Hanover, Frankfurt, Prague and Warsaw.

On 2 September 1981, Hanell was awarded the Goethe Prize of the City of Berlin for his work as principal conductor of the Großes Rundfunkorchester Berlin and as permanent guest conductor of the Staatsoper.

Hanell died in 2009 in Fredersdorf-Vogelsdorf aged 84.

== Work ==
=== Stage works ===
- Die Bettler von Damaskus, 1944, 1947.
- Cecil, Chamber opera 1946
- Die Gnomenwette, Märchenoper 1948, 1949.
- Die Spieldose, Opera in 2 acts, libretto by Robert Hanell after the play by Georg Kaiser, Erfurt 1957
- Dorian Gray, Opera with 9 scenes with 8 interludes, libretto by Robert Hanell after Oscar Wilde, UA Dresdner Staatsoper 9 June 1962
- Oben und unten, UA Magdeburg 1964
- Esther, Opera in 2 acts, libretto by Günther Deicke, Premiere Staatsoper Berlin 10 Oct. 1966
- Griechische Hochzeit, UA Leipzig 31 May 1969
- Fiesta, UA Weimar 1974
- Reise mit Joujou, UA Landesbühnen Radebeul 9 Oct. 1976
- Babettes grüner Schmetterling, 1984
