= Leipzig Opera =

Opera house in Leipzig, Germany

Coordinates: 51°20′25″N 12°22′53″E

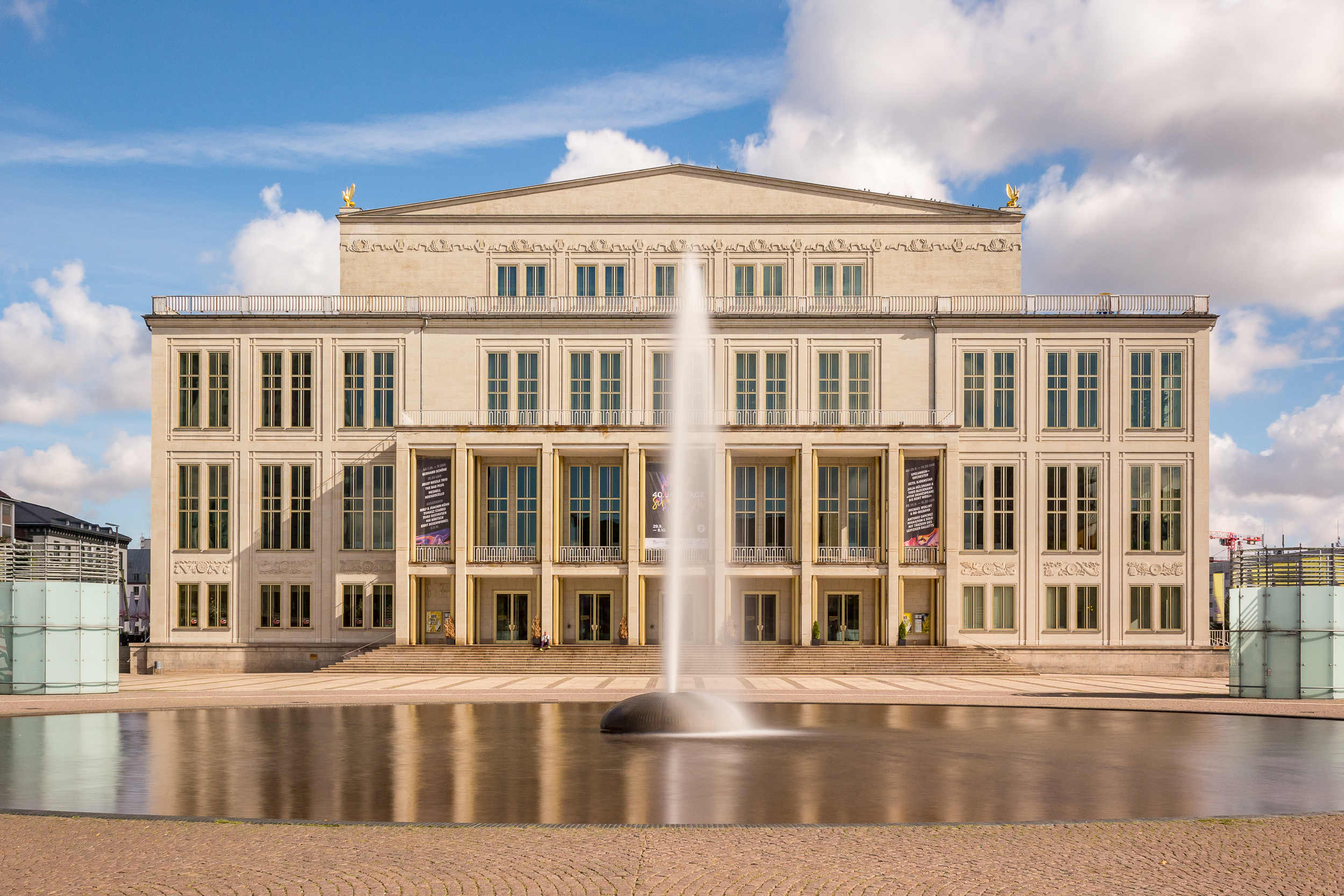
Frontage of Leipzig Opera building.

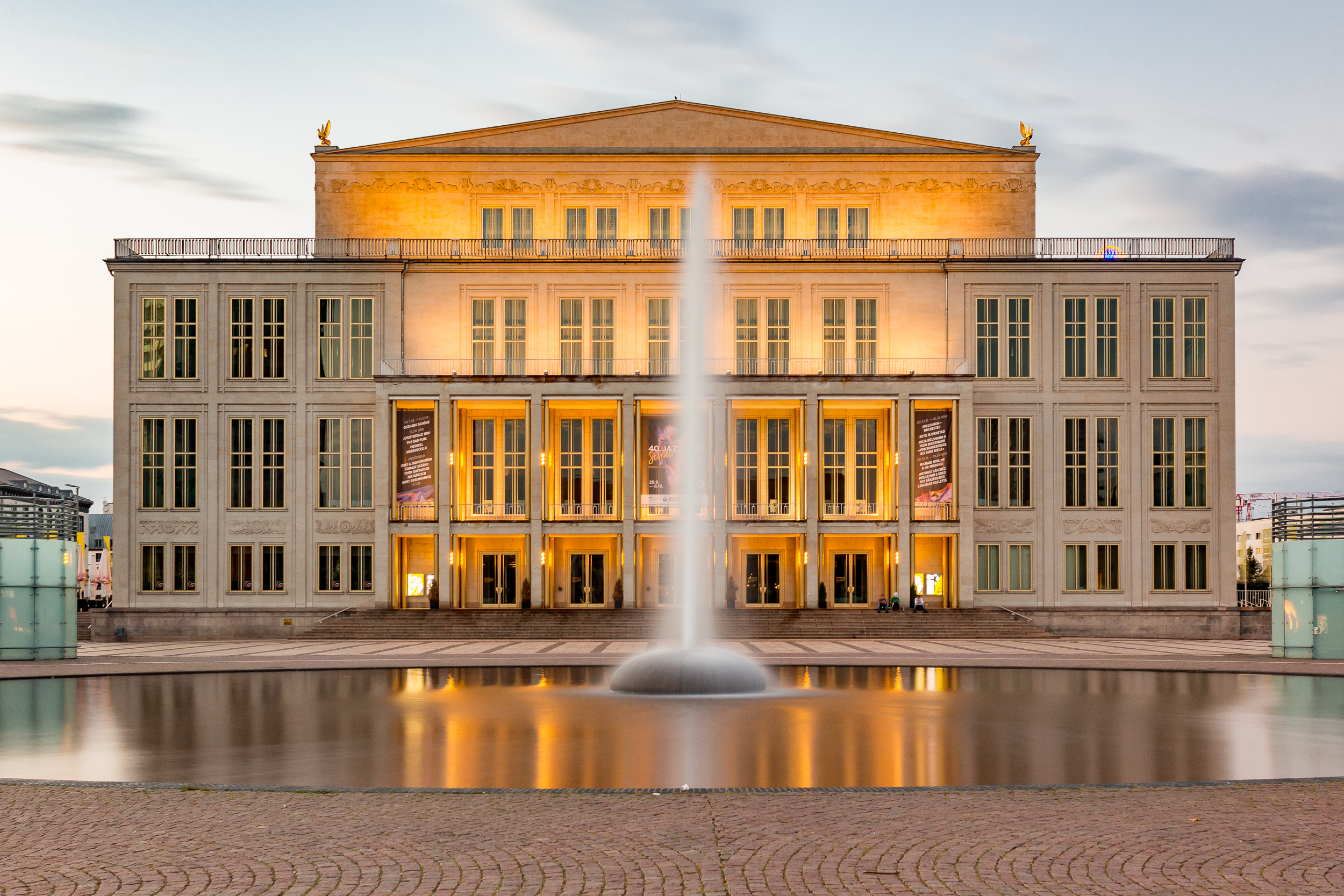
Frontage of Leipzig Opera building during night.

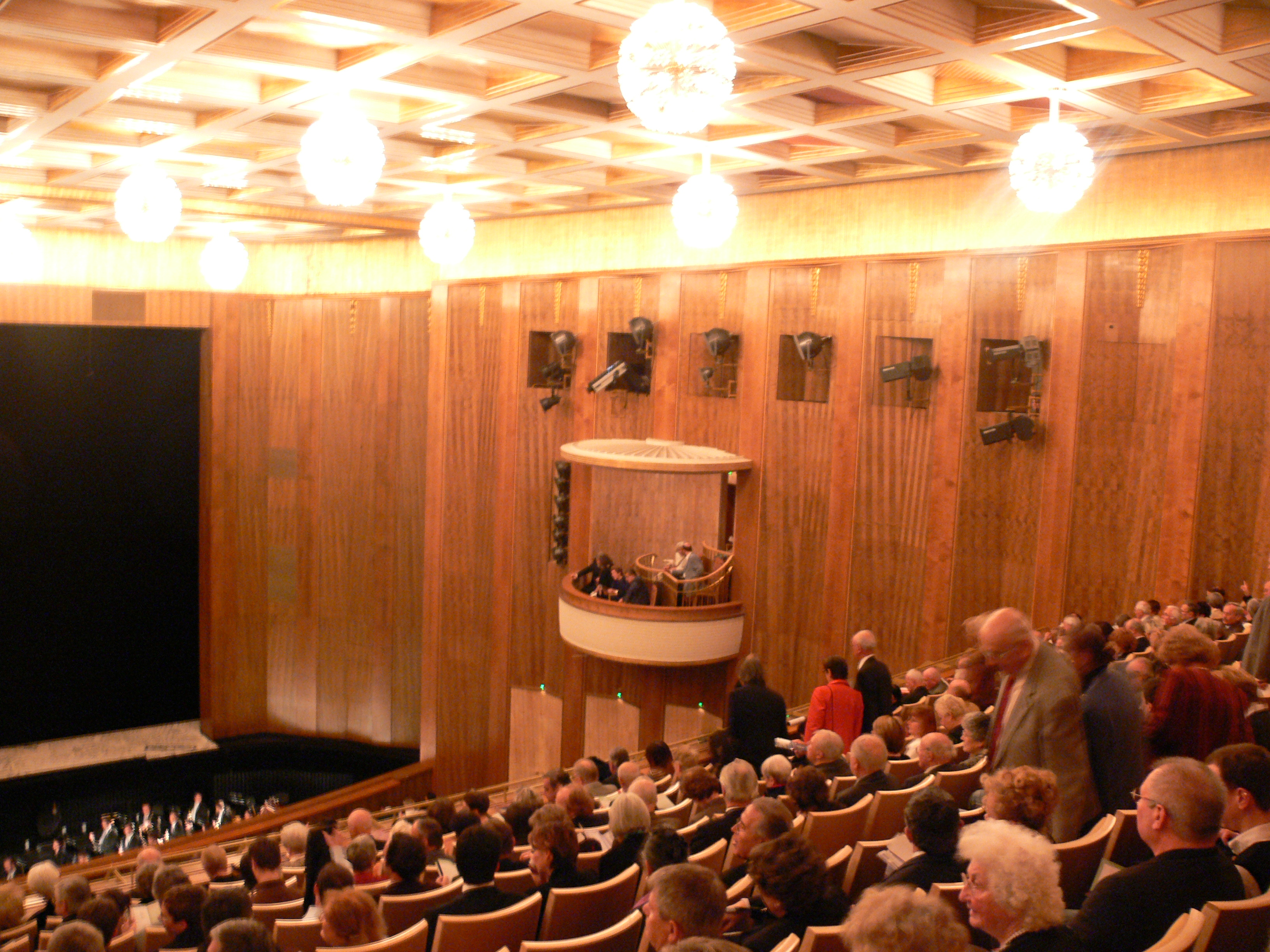
Interior of Leipzig Opera

The Leipzig Opera (German: Oper Leipzig) is an opera house and opera company located at the Augustusplatz and the Inner City Ring Road at its east side in Leipzig's district Mitte, Germany.

== History ==
Performances of opera in Leipzig trace back to Singspiel performances beginning in the year 1693. The composer of many early operas at the first opera house, the Oper am Brühl, was Telemann. He was director of the house from 1703 to 1705.

The Leipzig Opera does not have its own opera orchestra – the Leipzig Gewandhaus Orchestra performs as its orchestra. This relationship began in 1766 with performances of the Singspiel Die verwandelten Weiber, oder Der Teufel ist los by Johann Adam Hiller.

== Opera House, 1868 ==
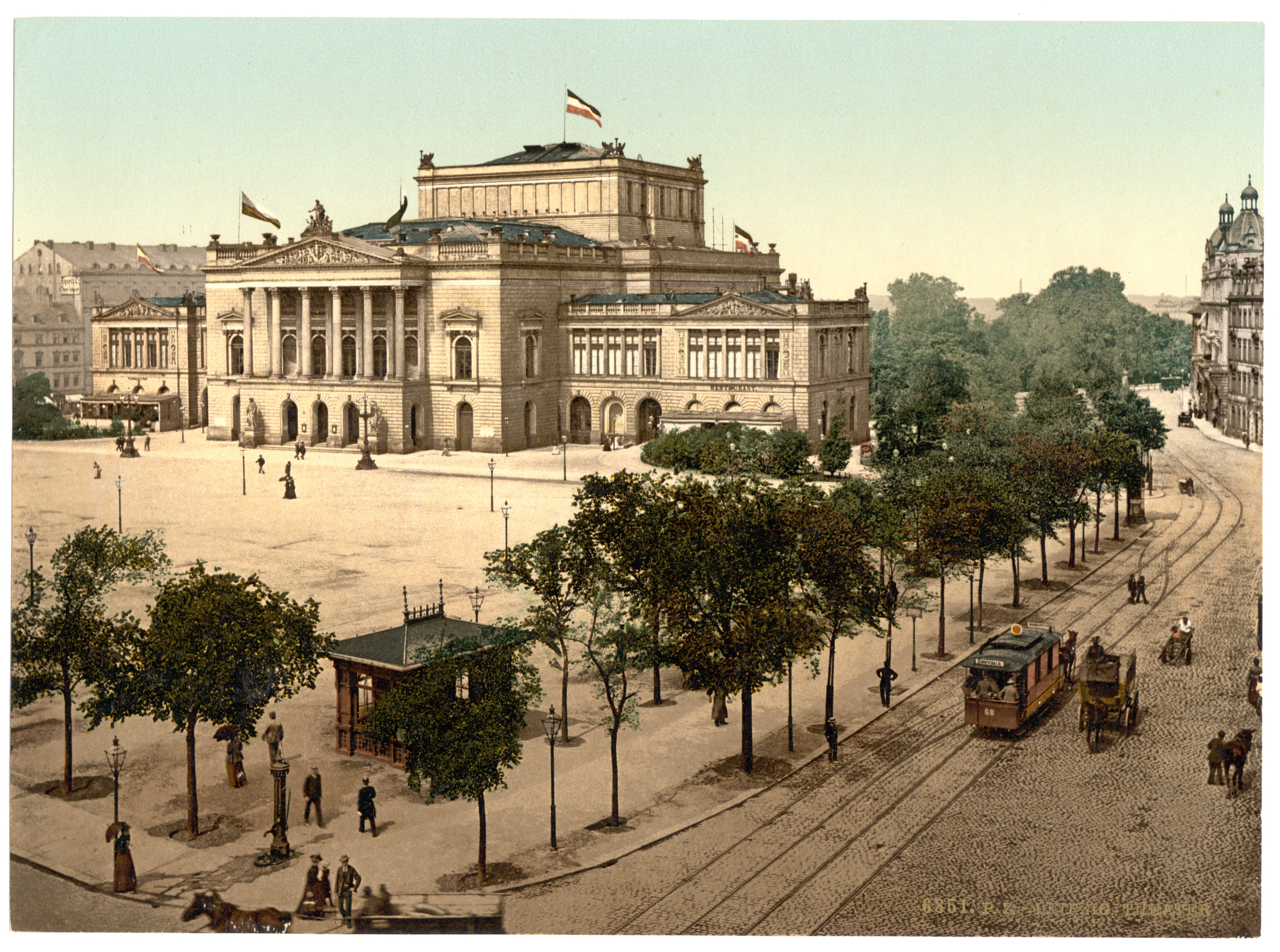
Neues Theater, circa 1900.

The previous theater (the "Neues Theater") was inaugurated on 28 January 1868 with Jubilee Overture by Carl Maria von Weber and the overture for Iphigénie en Aulide by Gluck and Goethe's play Iphigenia in Tauris. From 1886 to 1888, Gustav Mahler was the second conductor; Arthur Nikisch was his superior. During an air raid in the night of 3 December 1943, part of the bombing of Leipzig in World War II, the theater was destroyed, as were all of Leipzig's theatres.

== Opera House, 1960 ==
Construction of the modern opera house began in 1956. The theater was inaugurated on 8 October 1960 with a performance of Wagner's Die Meistersinger von Nürnberg.

Ulf Schirmer became Generalmusikdirektor (General Music Director, or GMD) of the company in 2009. He was elected artistic director (Intendant) in 2011 for a five-year term. Schirmer stood down from both posts in 2022.

Tobias Wolff became Intendant of the company in 2022. Christoph Gedschold became music director of the company as of the 2022–2023 season. In May 2023, the company announced that Gedschold is to stand down as its music director as of the close of the 2023–2024 season.

== General music directors (partial list) ==
- Arthur Nikisch (1878)
- Gustav Mahler (1886–1888)
- Otto Lohse (1912)
- Gustav Brecher (1923)
- Paul Schmitz (1932)
- Helmut Seydelmann (1951)
- Paul Schmitz (1964)
- Lothar Zagrosek (1990–1992)
- Jiří Kout (1993)
- Michail Jurowski (1999)
- Riccardo Chailly (2005–2008)
- Ulf Schirmer (2009–2022)
- Christoph Gedschold (2022–present)

== World premieres ==
Several operas received their premiere in Leipzig, including:

- 1826: Oberon by Weber (first production in Germany)
- 1828: Der Vampyr by Marschner
- 1837: Zar und Zimmermann by Lortzing
- 1850: Genoveva by Schumann
- 1902: Orestes by Felix Weingartner
- 1906: The Wreckers by Ethel Smyth
- 1927: Jonny spielt auf by Krenek
- 1930: Aufstieg und Fall der Stadt Mahagonny by Weill
- 1931: Die Blume von Hawaii by Abraham
- 1933: Der Silbersee by Weill
- 1937: Viola by Ludwig Schmidseder
- 1943: Catulli Carmina by Orff
- 1966: Guyana Johnny by Alan Bush
- 1971: Der zerbrochne Krug by Fritz Geißler
- 1988: Der Idiot by Karl Ottomar Treibmann
- 1991: Matka by Annette Schlünz
- 1993: Nachtwache by Jörg Herchet
- 1993: Dienstag from Licht by Stockhausen
- 1996: Freitag from Licht by Stockhausen
- 1997: Abraum by Jörg Herchet
- 2001: Persephone oder der Ausgleich der Welten by Günter Neubert
- 2006: Der schwarze Mönch by Philippe Hersant
- 2009: Rituale – eine Tanzoper für Georg Friedrich Händel by Heike Hennig
- 2009: Das Wesentliche ist unsichtbar, production of the opera's children's choir
- 2010: Monsieu Mathieu, was wird? production of the opera's children's choir with schools, music by Bruno Coulais and Christophe Barratier
- 2011: Was, wäre, wenn? production of the opera's children's choir
- 2011: Waldrandgeflüster, production of the opera's youth and children's choir
- 2015: The Canterville Ghost by Gordon Getty
