= Raimund von zur-Mühlen =

German tenor (1854–1931)

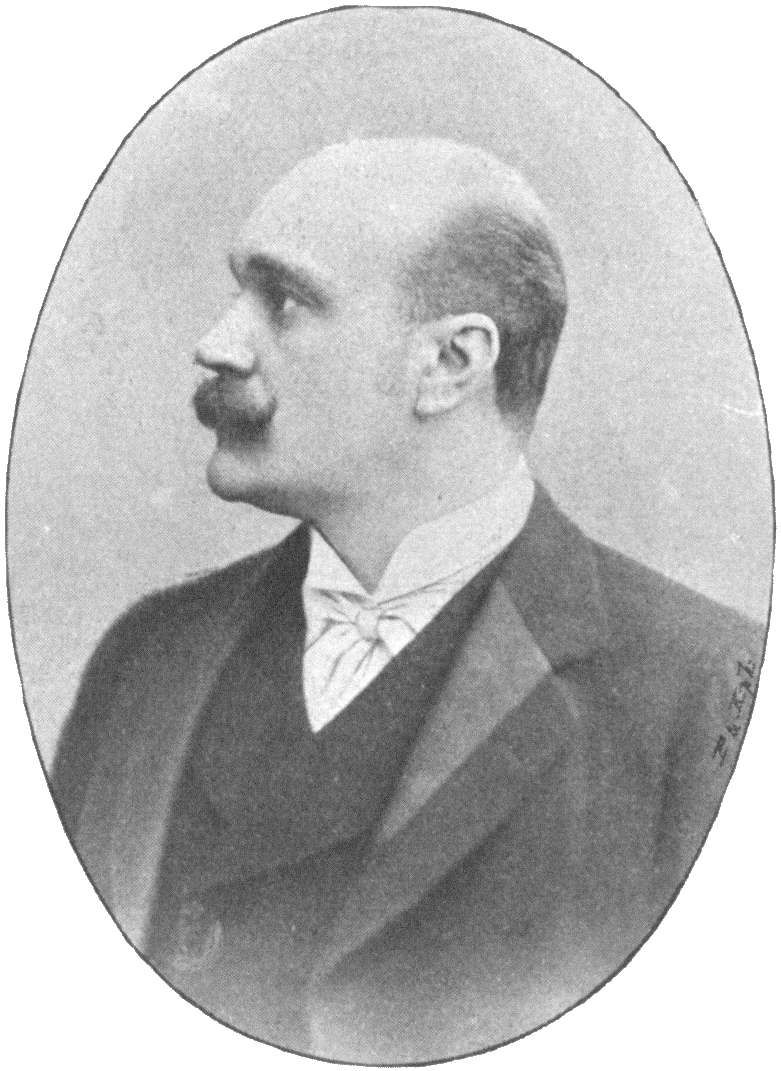
Raimund von zur-Mühlen

Baron Raimund von zur-Mühlen (sometimes "Raymond", "Raimund von Zur Mühlen") (10 November 1854 in Uusna Manor (Neu-Tennasilm), Viljandi Parish (now in Viiratsi Parish), Viljandi County, Governorate of Livonia – 11 December 1931 in Wiston, near Steyning, England) was a celebrated tenor Lieder singer who also became a famous teacher of singing, instructing many famous artists. His Lieder interpretations are legendary.

== Life and career ==
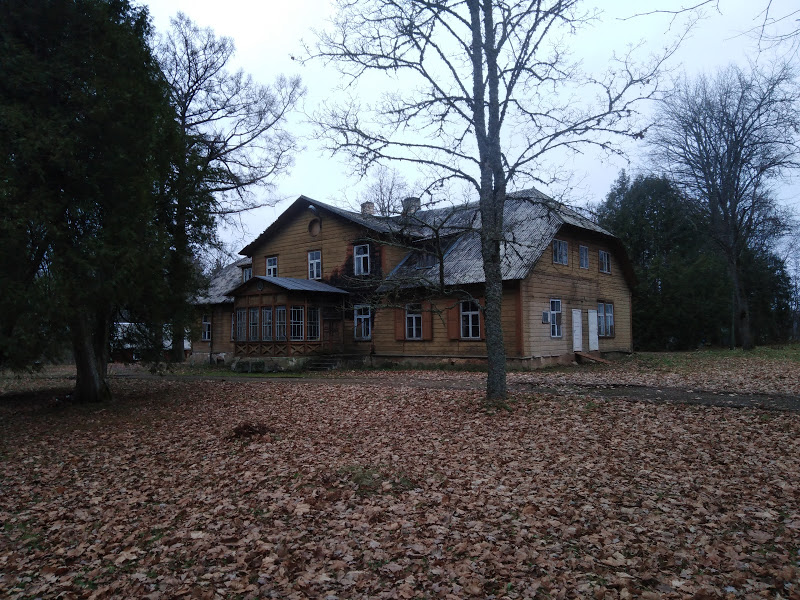
View of Neu-Tennasilm Manor

He was a student of Auguste Hohenschildt, Felix Schmidt, Adolf Schulze, Julius Stockhausen and Clara Schumann. He made his debut in 1878, together with Hans Schmidt, in Riga. He then continued working on his capabilities as a singer, above all with Manuel Garcia, Beniamino Carelli and Pauline Viardot.

He is recognised as the founder of the Lieder-abend or evening recital of the German concert Lieder as a distinct performance entity. His interpretation of Lieder and his specialist study of Lieder interpretation were of the utmost importance in the evolution of the Lieder genre itself. He gave Schumann Lieder-recitals with Clara Schumann. She set him on the path to London, where he gave his first concert in 1883. At one of his concerts, Johannes Brahms shouted out, "Endlich, endlich habe ich meinen Sänger gefunden!" ("At last, at last, I have found my singer!")

Thereafter, he spent much time in London. In 1907, he emigrated to England, with homes in London and Steyning. His last stay in Germany must have been in 1913–1914 in Berlin, where he gave a course of masterclasses. He lived in England for the remainder of his life. Here he met for the last time Monika Hunnius, author and singing teacher, who had regularly studied with him from 1904 to 1911 at the Schloss Fellin or at Neuhausen, and developed a deep friendship with him.

In his younger days, he usually appeared with his habitual accompanist, Hans Schmidt. Among his later accompanists were Victor Beigel and Coenraad V. Bos. Bos mentions him in his book: the singer gave his young accompanist no encouragement but criticized him severely. After their fifth concert together, he was told, "You must have played well today, for I did not notice you." He was the teacher of Lula Mysz-Gmeiner (who taught Elisabeth Schwarzkopf), of Mark Raphael, Hans Lissman, Eva Jekelius-Lissman, Rose Walter, Eidé Norena, Georg A. Walter, Fanny Opfer, Naima Wifstrand, and Hermann Weißenborn, among many others.

He was considered an ideal Lieder singer. He is also described as an eccentric. He was born into an aristocratic family. His valuable collection of documents and musical and artistic papers was destroyed in 1930 in a great fire at his house near Steyning.

== Sources ==
- Dorothea von zur-Mühlen, Der Sänger Raimund von zur-Mühlen (Hannover, Harro von Hirschheydt 1969).
- Monika Hunnius, Mein Weg zur Kunst.
- W. and R. Elwes, Gervase Elwes, The Story of His Life (Grayson and Grayson, London 1935).
- Gerald Moore, Am I Too Loud (Harmondsworth 1966).
- H. Arnold Smith, 'Baron Raimund von zur-Mühlen: The Passing of a Great Artist', Musical Times Vol 73 no 107 (1 April 1932), 316–320.
- Obituary, in Music and Letters 1932, pp. 215–217.
