= Rebaste =

Rebaste may refer to several places in Estonia:

- Rebaste, Põlva County, village in Estonia
- Rebaste, Tartu County, village in Estonia
- Rebaste, Viljandi County, village in Estonia
