= Vasara =

Vasara (Finnish for hammer) can refer to:

- Jussi Vasara (born 1987), Finnish footballer
- Mika Vasara (born 1983), Finnish shot putter
- Vesa Vasara (born 1976), Finnish footballer and coach
- Vasara, Estonia, village in Viiratsi Parish, Viljandi County, Estonia
- Vasara (video game), 2000 video game
- Vāsara, Sanskrit word for week
