= Reiner Süß =

German bass and politician

Reiner Süß (2 February 1930 – 29 January 2015) was a German Kammersänger (bass), entertainer and politician (SPD).

== Life ==
Born in Chemnitz, Süß attended the St. Thomas School, Leipzig and studied singing with Hans Lissmann among others. He was a member of the Leipzig Thomanerchor. From 1953, Süß was engaged by the Leipziger Rundfunkchor. Süß made his stage debut in 1956 in the Carl-Maria-von-Weber-Theater in Bernburg as Njegus in The Merry Widow. In the following year, Süß was engaged by the Halle Opera House. Since 1959, he was a member of the Berlin State Opera in the role of a Bassbuffo.

In 1962, he received the title Kammersänger. Important roles were the Ochs auf Lerchenau in Der Rosenkavalier, Bartolo in Il barbiere di Siviglia and Falstaff. Süß also appeared in productions of contemporary operas, such as the title role in Paul Dessau's Puntila and as Kowaljow in Shostakovich's opera The Nose. In 1967, he was awarded the National Prize of the GDR. He celebrated great successes at the Vienna State Opera and the Opéra de Paris. He became known to a wide audience as presenter of the GDR television programme Da liegt Musike drin, which was broadcast from 1968 to 1985.

In 1998 Süß said farewell to the big opera houses. Since then he has accepted various engagements at smaller stages. In 2003/2004, for example, he performed at the Anhaltisches Theater in Dessau as Ollendorf in Der Bettelstudent. He made further appearances in Eisenhüttenstadt, Putbus and other places in the new federal states of Germany "out of a desire for the cause".

Süß published a large number of records and CDs with opera arias and songs.

Since May 1990, he was a member of the Social Democratic Party of Germany. He became a member of the East Berlin Berliner Stadtverordnetenversammlung in May 1990 and was a member of the Berlin-Mahlsdorf. Süß died, four days before his 85th birthday, in a nursing home in Friedland.

== Work ==
- Da lag Musike drin. Erinnerungen. Lehmstedt, Leipzig 2010, ISBN 978-3-937146-82-9.
