= Gianni Schicchi discography =

This is a list of the recordings of Gianni Schicchi, the third of a group of three one-act operas by Giacomo Puccini collectively known as Il trittico; the other operas are Il tabarro and Suor Angelica. The three were premiered at the Metropolitan Opera on 14 December 1918, and for the next three years were always played together. After 1921, however, Puccini agreed that the operas could be performed separately. Gianni Schicchi became the most popular and most frequently performed of the three, often paired with other works such as Maurice Ravel's L'heure espagnole and Richard Strauss's Salome.

Despite its popularity as a stage work, Gianni Schicchi was not available as a recording until after the Second World War, a neglect described by a Gramophone reviewer as "extraordinary". The first issued recording, an early LP release in 1950, was from a live performance at the Met on 12 March 1949. It was followed, also in 1950, by a recording from a Radio Turin broadcast; thereafter, recordings were issued at regular intervals on long-playing and, later, compact disc formats. The first VHS (videotape) was in 1983, since when several more DVD versions have been released. While the majority of recordings are based on the original Italian libretto, three German-language versions were issued in the 1970s. Opera stars who have featured in recordings include Giuseppe Di Stefano, Tito Gobbi, Victoria de los Ángeles, Renata Tebaldi, Dietrich Fischer-Dieskau, Plácido Domingo and Angela Gheorghiu.

== Recordings ==
Many of the listed recordings have been issued under several labels. For audio recordings, only the first LP and the first CD issues are shown. For videos, the first VHS and DVD issues are shown. Unofficial recordings and pirate versions are not shown.

=== Audio ===
Year	Cast (Gianni Schicchi, Lauretta, Rinuccio)	Conductor, Opera house and orchestra	Label
1949	Italo Tajo; Licia Albanese; Giuseppe Di Stefano	Giuseppe Antonicelli; Metropolitan Opera orchestra & chorus (recorded on 12 Mar)	LP: HOPE; Cat: 228; CD: GOP; Cat: 830
1950	Giuseppe Taddei; Grete Rappsardi; Giuseppe Savio	Alfredo Simonetto; RAI National Symphony Orchestra	LP: Cetra; Cat: LPC 50028; CD: Preiser Records; Cat: 90074
1956	Renato Capecchi; Bruna Rizzoli; Agostino Lazzari	Francesco Molinari-Pradelli; Teatro di San Carlo orchestra & chorus	LP: Philips; Cat: 6540 032; CD: Philips Collectors; Cat: 442 106-2
1958	Fernando Corena; Laurel Hurley; Charles Anthony	Dimitri Mitropoulos; Metropolitan Opera orchestra & chorus (recorded on 8 Feb)	CD: Omega Opera; Cat: 1131
	Tito Gobbi; Victoria de los Ángeles; Carlo Del Monte	Gabriele Santini; Teatro dell'Opera di Roma orchestra & chorus	LP: HMV; Cat: 1726; CD: EMI; Cat: 7 64165-2
1962	Fernando Corena; Renata Tebaldi; Agostino Lazzari	Lamberto Gardelli; Maggio Musicale Fiorentino	LP: Decca; Cat: 236–238; CD: Decca Grand Opera; Cat: 411 665-2
1969	Giuseppe Taddei; Adriane Martino; Luciano Saldari	Oliviero De Fabritiis; Teatro La Fenice orchestra & chorus	CD: Mondo Musica; Cat: 10391
1972	Konrad Rupf; Anna Tomowa-Sintow; Valentin Teodorian	Herbert Kegel; Rundfunk Sinfonie Orchester Leipzig (sung in German)	LP: Eterna; Cat: 826 296; CD: Berlin Classics; Cat: 0020882BC
1973	Dietrich Fischer-Dieskau; Elke Schary; Claes H. Ahnsjö	Wolfgang Sawallisch; Bavarian State Opera orchestra & chorus (recorded on 7 Dec; sung in German)	CD: Orfeo; Cat: C 546 001 B
1975	Dietrich Fischer-Dieskau; Gerti Zeumer; Maria von Ilosvay	Alberto Erede; WDR Symphony Orchestra Cologne (sung in German)	LP: Westdeutscher Rundfunk; Cat: F 666.205
1976	Tito Gobbi; Ileana Cotrubaș; Plácido Domingo	Lorin Maazel; London Symphony Orchestra	LP: CBS Masterworks; Cat: 76563; CD: CBS; Cat: M3K 79312
1979	Walter Berry; Sona Ghazarian; Yordy Ramiro	Gerd Albrecht; Vienna State Opera orchestra & chorus (recorded on 11 Feb)	CD: Orfeo; Cat: C 768092 D
	Renato Capecchi; Angela Bello; Douglas Ahlstedt	Hans Vonk; Rotterdam Philharmonic Orchestra (recorded at Circustheater)	CD: Bella Voce; Cat: 107.406
1982	György Melis; Magda Kalmár; Denés Gulyás	János Ferencsik; Hungarian State Opera orchestra & chorus	LP: Hungaroton; Cat: 12541; CD: Hungaroton; Cat: 12541-2
1986	Rolando Panerai; Helen Donath; Peter Seiffert	Giuseppe Patanè; Munich Radio Orchestra	LP: Eurodisc; Cat: 208 404; CD: Eurodisc/RCA; Cat: 258 494
1991	Leo Nucci; Mirella Freni; Roberto Alagna	Bruno Bartoletti; Maggio Musicale Fiorentino	CD: Decca; Cat: 436 261-2
1993	Eduard Tumagian; Miriam Gauci; Yordy Ramiro	Alexander Rahbari; Orchestre Symphonique de la RTBF	CD: Discovery International; Cat: 920119
1998	José van Dam; Angela Gheorghiu; Roberto Alagna	Antonio Pappano; London Symphony Orchestra	CD: EMI; Cat: 5 56587-2
2002	Alberto Rinaldi; Tatiana Lisnic; Stefano Secco	Alexander Rahbari; Orquesta Filarmónica de Málaga	CD: Naxos; Cat: 8.660111

=== Video ===
Year	Cast (Gianni Schicchi, Lauretta, Rinuccio)	Conductor, Opera house and orchestra	Label
1983	Juan Pons; Cecilia Gasdia; Yuri Marusin	Gianandrea Gavazzeni; Teatro alla Scala orchestra & chorus	VHS: Castle; Cat: CV 2057; DVD: Warner Classics; Cat: 5046-70943-2
1993	Charles Damsel; Melody Johnson; Robert Brubaker	Paul Nadler Metropolitan Opera House & Orchestra	VHS: D'Alessio Productions OCLC: 30444516
2004	Alessandro Corbelli; Sally Matthews; Massimo Giordano	Vladimir Jurowski; London Philharmonic Orchestra (recorded at Glyndebourne Festival Opera)	DVD: Opus Arte; Cat: OA 0918
2007	Alberto Mastromarino; Amarilli Nizza; Andrea Giovannini	Julian Reynolds; Orchestra della Fondazione Toscanini	DVD: TDK; Cat:
2008	Leo Nucci; Nino Machaidze; Vittorio Grigolo	Riccardo Chailly; Teatro alla Scala orchestra & chorus	DVD: Encore; Cat: 3220
2010	Juan Pons; Cecilia Gasdia; Yuri Marusin	Gianandrea Gavazzeni; Teatro alla Scala orchestra & chorus	DVD: Warner Classics; Cat: 5046709432
