= Selma Nicklass-Kempner =

German soprano

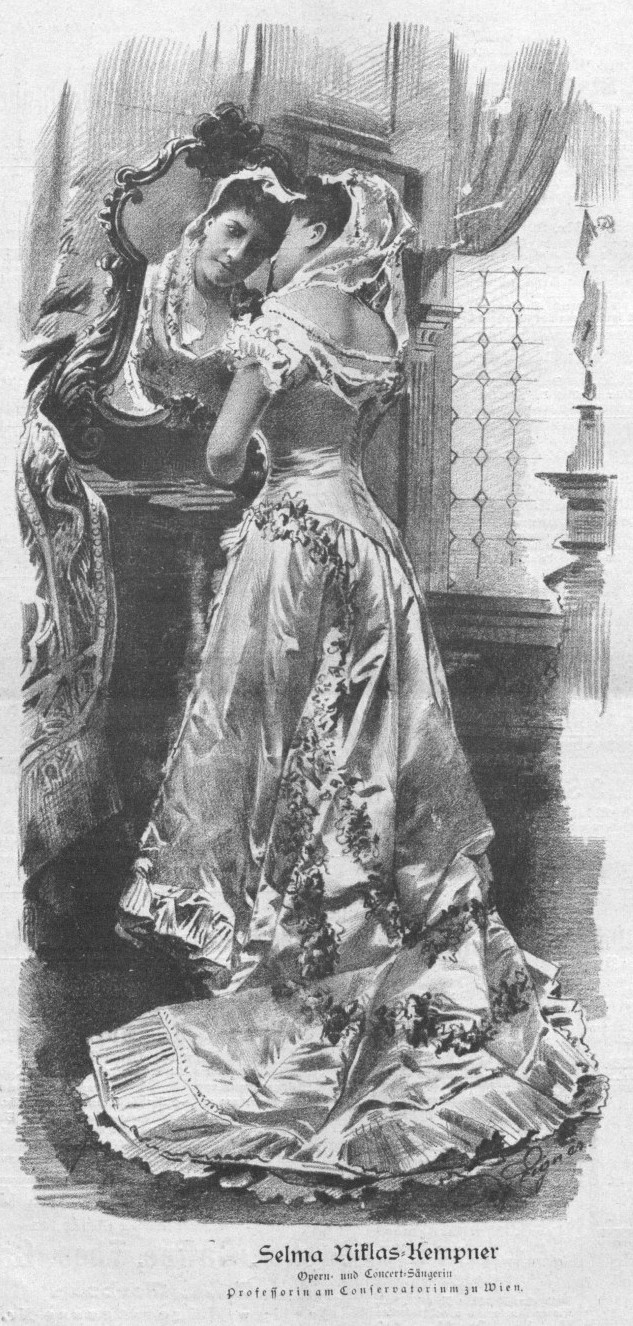
Selma Nicklass-Kempner (by Ignaz Eigner, 1886)

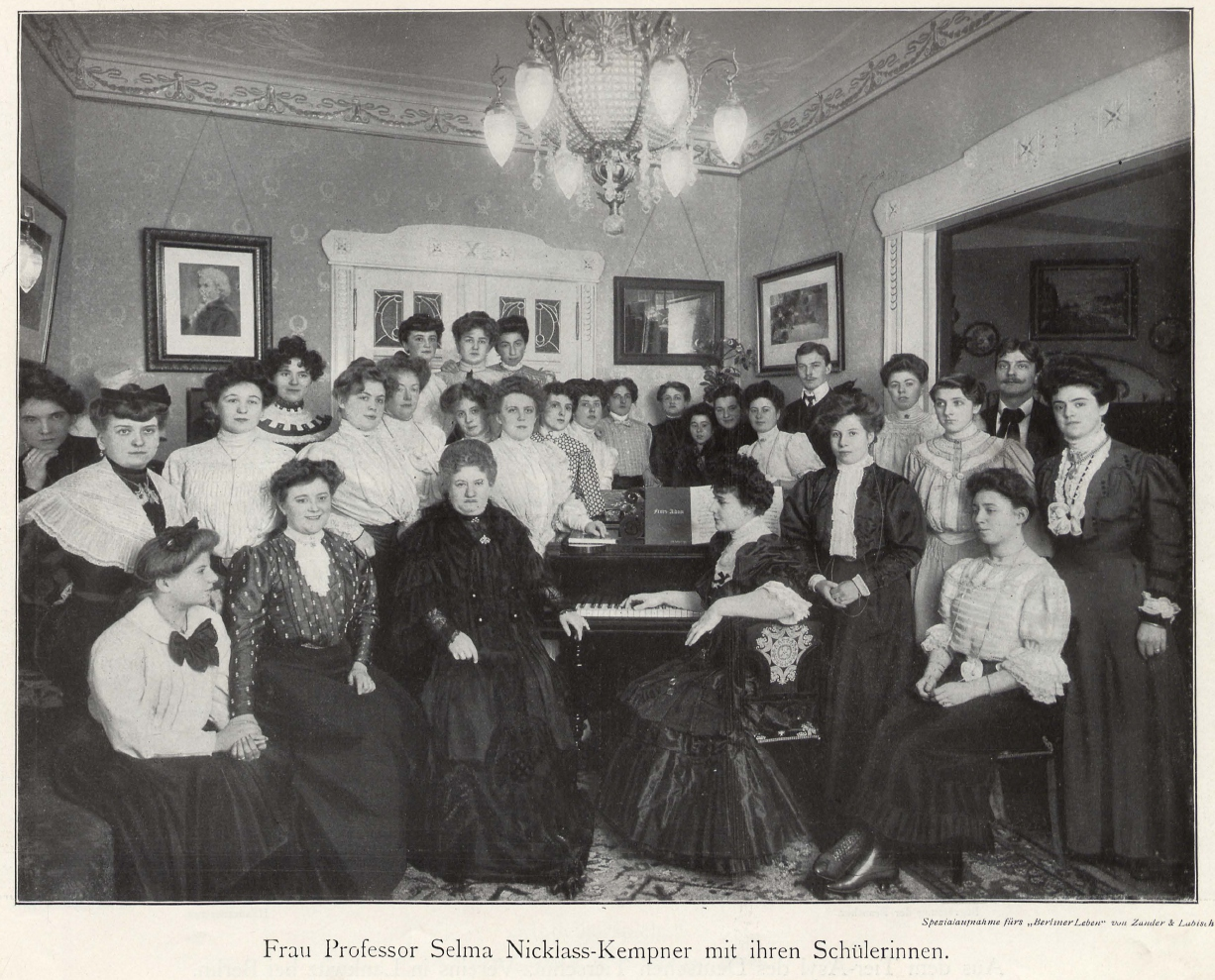
Selma Nicklass-Kempner with her students, 1905. Photo by Zander & Labisch.

Selma Nicklaß-Kempner, occasionally also Niklas-Kempner, (2 April 1850 – 22 December 1928) was a German operatic soprano and singing teacher.

== Life ==
Born in Breslau, Nicklass-Kempner was a Student of Jenny Meyer (1834–1894) and made her debut as "Amina" in Bellini's La sonnambula at the Berlin Kroll Opera House. She had engagements in Aachen, Augsburg, Berlin (at the Stern Conservatory), Leipzig, Rotterdam and Vienna, where from 1884 she worked as a singing teacher at the Gesellschaft der Musikfreunde and gave private lessons to Princess Stéphanie of Belgium (1864-1945).

The long list of students speaks for her skills and reputation as a singing teacher.

Nicklass-Kempner died in Berlin at the age of 78. Her grave is located at the Friedhof Wilmersdorf in Berlin.

Her husband, Georg Nicklass, died on 28 May 1893 at the age of 41 in Vienna, Trauerhaus Innere Stadt. Her daughter, Bertha Nicklass-Kempner, also became a soprano soloist and later, a singing teacher based in London. Her pupils included the international soprano Joan Carlyle.

== Students ==
- Louise von Ehrenstein (1867–1944)
- Mary Hagen (1867/1878–1944)
- Fanny Opfer (1870–1944)
- Ottilie Metzger (1878–1944)
- Ida Salden (1878–probably before 1930)
- Gertrud Förstel (1880–1950)
- Frieda Hempel (1885–1955)
- Mathilde Fröhlich
