= Mathilde Fröhlich =

Austrian soprano (1867–1934)

Mathilde Fröhlich (19 July 1867 – 8 November 1934) was an Austrian operatic soprano.

== Life ==
Born in Vienna, the daughter of the Viennese teacher Carl Fröhlich and his wife Antonie received her first music education from her father. She studied from September 1879 with interruptions until 1888/89 at the University of Music and Performing Arts Vienna. Among her teachers was the voice teacher Selma Nicklass-Kempner (1850–1928) and Leo Friedrich (1842–1908) for the dramatic representation .

=== Court opera singer in Dresden ===
On 1 March 1890, the graduate of the Vienna Conservatory auditioned for rehearsals at the Semperoper: Orfeo's aria by Gluck "Ach ich habe sie verloren" and the blessing aria from Le prophète by Giacomo Meyerbeer. She made her debut on 13 March 1890 as the "Fairy Morgana" in Goldmark's Opera Merlin.

On 20 March 1901, Fröhlich appeared at the Dresden Court Opera from the cycle Homeric World under the direction of Ernst von Schuch. The Dresden music critic Ernst Roeder praised her artistic qualities and also her stage appearance, especially her "advantageous appearance" and "tall, slim figure". Fröhlich was a member of the Guild of the German Stage.

=== Guest performance in London ===
The Hamburg opera director Bernhard Pollini became aware of the artist and arranged for her to make a guest appearance in London in 1892, for which she was granted the necessary leave of absence from the Dresden opera. At the London Covent Garden Opera, Fröhlich sang in Wagner's Ring of the Nibelung under the direction of Gustav Mahler the Rhinemaidens, Erda and a Valkyrie. She also appeared in a Wagner concert in London's St James's Hall.

After returning from England to the Dresden Opera, Fröhlich sang Erda and a part in Rubinstein's Kinder der Heide as well as Puk in Oberon and other opera figures such as Maddalena in Rigoletto and Lucia in Cavalleria rusticana. As a singer, she took part in church concerts, for example in Chemnitz with the aria: Se i mici Sospiri, which was attributed to Alessandro Stradella, and with the song Sei stille dem Herrn from Mendelssohn's Elija.

=== Leaving the Dresden Opera ===
After her marriage in 1901, Fröhlich took the name of her husband, the later Viennese district inspector Otto Kolbe, and ended her professional career as an opera singer in Dresden. She lived with her husband Otto Kolbe († 1932), a daughter and her parents, Antonie and Carl/Karl Fröhlich († 1904), again in Vienna last as a widow and pensioner in the Cumberlandstraße.

Frölich died in Vienna at the age of 77 and was buried in the Central Cemetery on 12 November 1934.

The Austrian clarinettist, composer and university teacher Alfred Prinz (1930–2014) was her grandson.
