= Hans Lissmann =

Hans Lissmann may refer to:

- Hans Lissmann (zoologist)
- Hans Lissmann (tenor)
