= Anton Irv =

Estonian military personnel

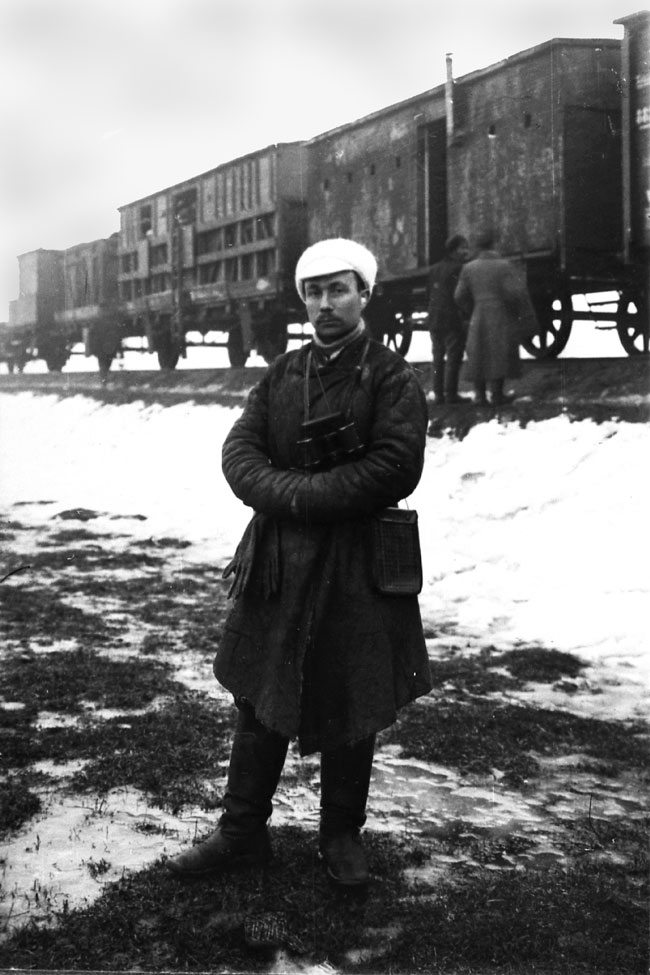
- Born: 17 September 1886; Ruudiküla, Viljandi Parish, Kreis Fellin, Governorate of Livonia
- Died: 27 April 1919 (aged 32); Egle railway station (near Strenči), Latvia
- Military career
- Allegiance: Estonia
- Branch: Estonia
- Service years: 1914–1917 Imperial Russian Army; 1918–1919 Estonian Army
- Rank: Captain
- Unit: Division of Armoured Trains
- Conflicts: World War I Estonian War of Independence

Anton Irv VR I/2, VR II/2, VR II/3 (17 September 1886 – 27 April 1919) was a highly decorated Estonian combat soldier and military officer during World War I and in the Estonian War of Independence.

Along with captain Karl Parts, he was the leader of Estonian armored trains in the Estonian War of Independence. Anton Irv died in the Battle of Egle (near Strenči) in Latvia.

Anton Irv was born in Sillaotsa farmstead, Ruudiküla village, Viljandi Parish, Viljandi County, Governorate of Livonia. Before World War I, Irv worked as a teacher.

During the World War I, he served in the Imperial Russian Army. He showed his good leading abilities and courage which led him to be decorated with all four classes of the Cross of St. George (the set of a "Full Cavalier"), the Médaille militaire and the Gold Sword for Bravery. In 1915 Irv was promoted to commissioned officer.

In the end of 1917 he came to Estonia, and helped to organize the Estonian military forces in order to fight against the Red Army in the Estonian War of Independence. Irv helped to organize the Division of Armoured Trains and became a commander of that unit on 23 January 1919.

After rushing the Red Army out of the Estonian territory in 1919, Estonian Southern front moved into the territory of Latvia and helped also to liberate the North of Latvia of the units of the Red Army. Irv was leading his unit in the battle near the railway station of Egle (near Strenči) on 27 April 1919, when he was suddenly killed.

== Decorations ==
Russian Empire

- Cross of St. George – I, II, III, IV class
- Order of St. Anna – III class with swords
- Order of St. Stanislaus – II, III class
- Gold Sword for Bravery

French Republic

- Médaille militaire

Republic of Estonia

- Estonian Cross of Liberty VR I/2 for Military Leadership – 2. class (posthumously)
- Estonian Cross of Liberty VR II/2 for Personal Courage – 2. class (posthumously)
- Estonian Cross of Liberty VR II/3 for Personal Courage – 3. class (posthumously)
