= Louise von Ehrenstein =

Austrian operatic soprano

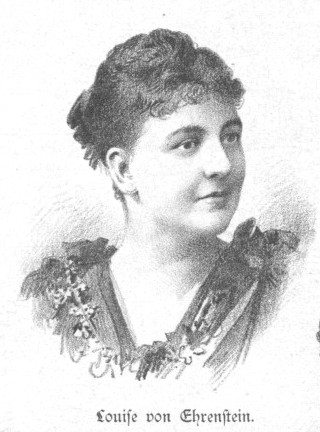
- Louise von Ehrenstein, by Ignaz Eigner (in Der Humorist 10 September 1891)
- Born: 17 March 1867; Vienna, Austria
- Died: 13 February 1944 (aged 76); Vienna, Austria
- Other names: Louise Königstein (married name)
- Occupation: operatic soprano
- Spouse: Joseph Königstein (m. 1891)
- Parents: Friedrich von Ehrenstein (father); Elisabeth von Ehrenstein, née Schmid (mother)
- Awards: Kammersänger (1899)

Louise von Ehrenstein, married name Louise Königstein (17 March 1867 – 13 February 1944), was an Austrian operatic soprano.

== Life ==
Born in Vienna, Ehrenstein came in 1867 as the daughter of the k. k. Generalintendant of the Austrian Gendarmerie Friedrich von Ehrenstein and his wife Elisabeth, née Schmid. She was the youngest of three musically talented daughters. Her sister Gisela von Ehrenstein (1859–1932) was a well-known concert pianist.

Louise's talent showed early. By the age of nine she was already singing coloratura arias at societies such as those of Rosine, Luise and Amina. At the age of 13, she performed a rondo by Mozart at a public concert. She also appeared occasionally as the female lead in the opera Die vierzehn Nothelfer by Richard von Perger. Despite her success with the public, her parents had reservations about a stage career for their daughter. A friend of the family then asked the opera singer Pauline Lucca to talk the girl out of her career aspirations, which she agreed to do. After Louise had sung her an aria by Mozart and some songs, Lucca recognised her talent and instead encouraged her in her plans for the future.

Afterwards, Ehrenstein completed three years of vocal studies with Selma Nicklass-Kempner. She also took lessons in gait, dance and mimic with the dancer Bertha Linda (1850–1928, married to Makart). She had trial performances as Leonore in Olomouc and as Margarethe in Brno. In May 1888, following a request from Bolko von Hochberg, she came to the Staatsoper Unter den Linden as a replacement for the singer Marie Renard. There, she made her debut with the roles of Carmen, Mignon and Margarethe, which she had previously rehearsed with Lucca. Ehrenstein gave up the engagement after only one year, as she was assigned roles that did not correspond to her wishes. So she rehearsed with Johanna Jachmann-Wagner the Wagner's roles of Elisabeth, Elsa and Senta, but had to sing Marie, Zerline and Susanne instead.

Thereupon, Ehrenstein went to the Vienna State Opera in 1889. There she made her debut as Elisabeth on 5 August, followed by performances as Margarethe and Elsa. After this guest performance she became a permanent member of the Vienna Court Opera on September 1 and worked there as a successful singer with a large repertoire for more than 10 years. She achieved one of her greatest successes in 1889 with the title role in the Legende von der heiligen Elisabeth by Franz Liszt. She also became famous for her interpretation of Wagnerian roles. Ehrenstein turned down various offers of contracts, for example from South America, New York and Madrid and stayed in Vienna. However, she gave numerous guest performances, among others at the Teatro Regio di Torino (1895), at La Scala (1896), the Hofoper Munich (1897), in Budapest, Prague and Trieste.

On 11 November 1891, Ehrenstein married the Viennese music critic and writer Joseph Königstein (1844–1902). On November 23, 1899, on the occasion of her retirement from the association of the court opera theatre, the emperor appointed her as Kammersängerin.

Ehrenstein died in Vienna at the age of 76.
