= Mäeltküla =

Village in Estonia

- Village
- Location in Estonia
- Coordinates: 58°20′12″N 25°40′34″E
- Country: Estonia
- County: Viljandi County
- Municipality: Viljandi Parish

Population (2011 Census)
  - Total: 86

Mäeltküla is a village in Viljandi Parish, Viljandi County, in southern Estonia. As of the 2011 census, the settlement's population was 86. It was a part of Viiratsi Parish before 2013.

The Ekseko farm, the biggest pig farm in the Baltic states with 37,500 pigs, is located in Mäeltküla It is the main producer of Rakvere Lihakombinaat's meat.
