= Monika Hunnius =

German Baltic writer

Monika Adele Elisabeth Hunnius (14 July 1858 - 30 December 1934) was a German-Baltic writer, one of the most famous German authors of the Baltic states in the 20th century.

== Life ==
Hunnius grew up in Riga where she was born and spent the long summer holidays mostly in Paide at her uncle Hermann Hesse's house, the grandfather of the writer Hermann Hesse. Her cousin Johannes Hesse, the father of the famous writer and Nobel Prize winner, she nevertheless only met him in Germany much later. Until his death, Hunnius felt connected to him through a deep friendship.

She received her vocal training first in Riga and then in Frankfurt, where she was taught by Julius Stockhausen, among others. At the Stockhausen house, she met Johannes Brahms. She was friends with Clara Schumann, Raimund von Zur Mühlen, Hans Schmidt, Eva Jekelius-Lißmann and Amalie Joachim, the wife of Joseph Joachim. From 1884, Hunnius taught singing and declamation in Riga.

From 1904 to 1911, Hunnius supported Raimund von Zur Mühlen in conducting singing courses in Viljandi (Fellin) and later in East Prussia Neuhäuser on the Baltic Sea near Pillau (today Baltijsk).

After First World War, Hunnius spent in Königsfeld im Schwarzwald the period of the Bolshevik rule in Latvia. Besides her work as a writer, she worked there as an assistant in a sanatorium. In 1923 she returned to Latvia. In the last years she suffered increasingly from paralysis.

In the last years of her life, the artist in need of care lived in the family of Ernst Gurland, the headmaster of the municipal German grammar school in Riga. He also won a particularly talented pupil, Gertrud Schettler, to write handwritten dictations for the increasingly frail woman.

Hunnius died in her hometown Riga at the age of 76.

== Work ==
- Bilder aus der Zeit der Bolschewikenherrschaft in Riga vom 3. Januar bis 22. Mai 1919, 1921 (1938: 24/26. Tsd.)
- Meine Weihnachten, 1922 (1975: 181/185 Tsd.)
- Mein Onkel Hermann. Erinnerung an Alt-Estland, with a foreword by Hermann Hesse, Verlag Eugen Salzer Heilbronn 1921 (1935: 82.–85. Tsd.)
- Menschen, die ich erlebte. 1922 (1962: 87/90. Tsd.)
- Mein Weg zur Kunst, 1925 (1953: 87/89. Tsd.)
- Baltische Häuser und Gestalten, 1926 (1935: 19/20. Tsd.)
- Aus Heimat und Fremde, 1928
- Jugendtage einer Deutsch-Baltin, 1929
- Baltische Frauen von einem Stamm, 1930 (1941: 22/29. Tsd.)
- Das Lied von der Heimkehr, 1932
- Mein Elternhaus. Erinnerungen, 1935 (1960: 51/55. Tsd.)
- Briefwechsel mit einem Freunde, edited by Sophie Gurland, 1935 (1955: 25/28. Tsd.)
- Zwei Frauen, Eugen Salzer-Verlag, Heilbronn 1936 (1964: 51/55. Tsd.)
- Wenn die Zeit erfüllet ist ... Briefe und Tagebuchblätter, edited by Anne-Monika Glasow, 1937
- Johannes, 1948 (1948: 6/10. Tsd.)
