= Ida Salden =

German soprano

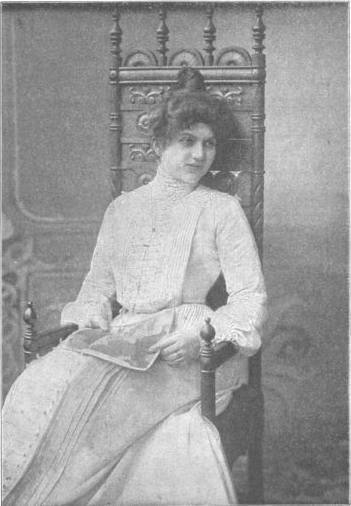
Ida Salden in 1903

Ida Salden (born in 1878 in Altona – 20th century) was a German operatic soprano.

== Life ==
Ida Salden completed her vocal training at the Stern Conservatory in Berlin and with Selma Nicklass-Kempner and started her stage career in 1900 at the Hamburger Stadttheater. She stayed there under contract until 1906. In a review from 1903, it was said, among other things: "The so talented young artist sang [...] with a warm cordiality [...] We are pleased to note that Miss Salden has proved herself so excellently as a youthful dramatic singer as well as a soubrette. In 1904, she took part in the first performance of Siegfried Wagner's Der Kobold.

After her time in Hamburg she changed to the Staatstheater Darmstadt and in 1909 to the Opernhaus Düsseldorf. There, she also sang at the first performance of a work, namely as Marga in Henri Alfred Kaiser's Stella maris.

From 1911 to 1913, Salden worked in Berlin at the Deutsches Künstlertheater, where she sang as Maliella in Wolf-Ferrari's I gioielli della Madonna. After the engagement in Berlin she moved back to Hamburg and made guest appearances there.

Salden sang Ortlinde in the Bayreuth festival in 1906, 1908 and 1909 in Wagner's Die Walküre; she also appeared there as the solo flower in Parsifal and in 1906 she was also the second squire in the same opera. In 1906 and 1907, she appeared at the Mannheim Hoftheater, In 1908 she made guest appearances at the Hoftheater in Karlsruhe, in 1909 at the Oper Frankfurt, in 1910 in Amsterdam and in 1911 in Hanover.

Among the roles in which she appeared were Pamina in Mozart's the Magic Flute, Elisabeth in Tannhäuser, Elsa in Lohengrin, Sieglinde in the Walküre, Gutrune in Götterdämmerung, Cio-Cio-San in Madama Butterfly, in Gounod's Faust, Martha in Tiefland and Blanchefleur in Wilhelm Kienzl's Der Kuhreigen.

According to some sources, she may have died in Hamburg in the 1920s. Various recordings exist of Salden. Newspaper clippings can be found in the Staatsarchiv der Freien und Hansestadt Hamburg under the signature 731-8 A 768.
