= Valma =

Village in Estonia

- Village
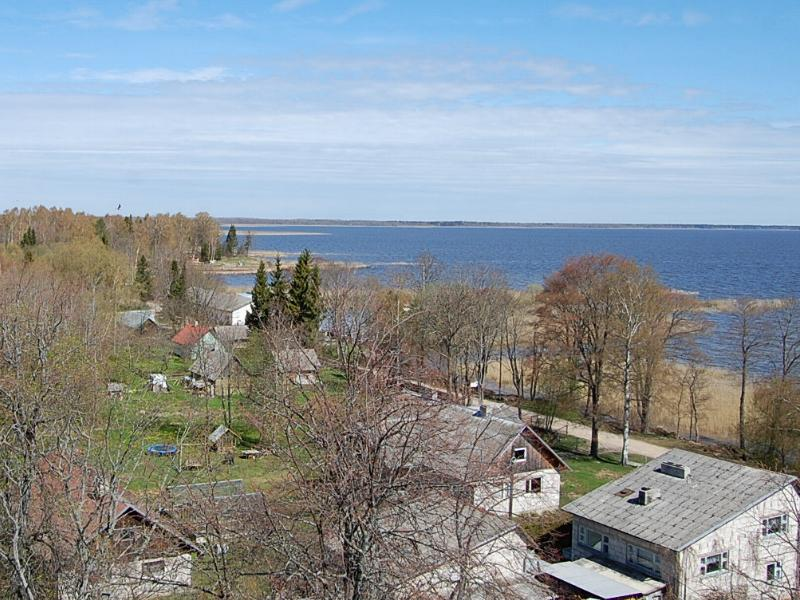

- Location within Estonia
- Coordinates: 58.366944444444°N 25.951111111111°E
- Country: Estonia
- County: Viljandi County
- Parish: Viljandi Parish
- Time zone: UTC+2 (EET)
  - Summer (DST): UTC+3 (EEST)

Valma is a fisherman village in Viljandi Parish, Viljandi County in Estonia.

Valma is one of the oldest settlements in Estonia. The first settlers occupied areas around Lake Võrtsjärv, where today Valma is located, about 4000 years ago. As a result of archaeological research, many tools from Stone Age, comb ceramics pottery and other valuable items have been found, which confirms the ancient settlements in that area.

Today, it is known for small fisherman port and tourism. It was a part of Viiratsi Parish before 2013.
