= Loime =

Village in Estonia

- Village
- Location within Estonia
- Coordinates: 58.382222222222°N 25.882777777778°E
- Country: Estonia
- County: Viljandi County
- Parish: Viljandi Parish
- Time zone: UTC+2 (EET)
  - Summer (DST): UTC+3 (EEST)

Loime is a village in Viljandi Parish, Viljandi County in Estonia. It was a part of Viiratsi Parish before 2013.
