= Fanny Opfer =

German soprano

Fanny Opfer (24 September 1870 – 28 March 1944) was a German soprano and singing teacher.

== Life ==
Born in Berlin, Opfer was a student of Etelka Gerster, Selma Nicklass-Kempner, and Raimund von Zur Mühlen. She made her debut as a concert singer in 1892. Her repertoire was made of Lieder and Oratorios.

Besides her concert activities, she taught singing at the Breslau Conservatory and also had private pupils in Berlin.

The "Machtergreifung" by the Nazis (she was in her early 60s at the time) increasingly restricted her professional activities. Nevertheless, she remained living in Berlin. In August 1943 she was deported to the Theresienstadt Ghetto, where she was murdered the following year. The exact circumstances of her death are not known.
