= Mr Puntila and His Man Matti =

German play by Bertolt Brecht

- Original language: German
- Written by: Bertolt Brecht
- Genre: Epic comedy
- Setting: Finland, 1920s

Premiere
- Date: 5 June 1948
- Place: Zurich

Mr Puntila and His Man Matti (German: Herr Puntila und sein Knecht Matti) is an epic comedy by the German modernist playwright Bertolt Brecht. It was written in 1940 and first performed in 1948.

The story describes the aristocratic land-owner Puntila's relationship to his servant, Matti, as well as his daughter, Eva, whom he wants to marry off to an Attaché. Eva herself loves Matti and so Puntila has to decide whether to marry his daughter to his driver or to an Attaché, while he also deals with a drinking problem.

In his essay "Notes on the Folk Play" (written in 1940), Brecht warns that "naturalistic acting is not enough in this case" and recommends an approach to staging that draws on the Commedia dell'Arte. The central relationship between Mr Puntila and Matti—in which Puntila is warm, friendly and loving when drunk, but cold, cynical and penny-pinching when sober—echoes the relationship between the Tramp and the Millionaire in Charlie Chaplin's City Lights (1931). The duality of Mr. Puntila is an example of Brecht's use of the literary device, the split character. The play is also an inspiration for some of the main characters in Vishal Bhardwaj's Matru Ki Bijlee Ka Mandola.

== Characters ==
- Puntila, a landowner
- Eva, his daughter
- Matti, his chauffeur
- The Waiter
- The Judge
- The Attaché
- The Vet
- Sly-Grog Emma
- The Chemist's Assistant
- The Milkmaid
- The Telephonist
- A Fat Man
- A Labourer
- The Red-haired Man
- The Weedy Man
- Red Surkkala
- His Four Children
- Laina, the cook
- Fina, the parlourmaid
- The Lawyer
- The Parson
- The Parson's Wife
- Woodcutters

== Composition ==
Brecht's play is based on another by his host during his exile in Finland—the Finnish-Estonian playwright Hella Wuolijoki—called The Sawdust Princess, a German translation of which Wuolijoki dictated to Margarete Steffin during August 1940. Wuolijoki's work had the dramatic structure of a well-made play, which, Brecht concluded, hampered her achievement as a writer. Its protagonist, Puntila (who is described as a "Finnish Bacchus"), was based on a cousin of Wuolijoki's former husband called Roope Juntula. Juntula had become engaged with three village women and had also driven his Buick recklessly in the middle of the night to procure alcohol—both episodes that would be dramatised in Brecht's story. Wuolijoki suggested a collaboration with Brecht on an entry for a competition run by the Finnish Dramatists' League for a "people's play," whose deadline was to fall in October. The title page of Brecht's play describes it as "a people's play" that is "after stories and a draft play by Hella Wuolijoki." Brecht began work on his non-Aristotelian version of the story on 2 September and finished a first draft three weeks later. Along with the structural transformation from dramatic to epic, Brecht described his main tasks in re-working Wuolijoki's original as: "to bring out the underlying farce, dismantle the psychological discussions so as to make place for tales from Finnish popular life or statements of opinion, find a theatrical form for the master/man contradiction, and give the theme back its poetic and comic aspects." Brecht gave his story a downbeat ending, in which Matti resigns himself to the impossibility of authentic human relationships across the divide of social class, excepting the intoxicated illusions that alcohol provides. He transformed the treatment of alcoholism from a national problem for the Finnish, as it was dramatised in The Sawdust Princess, to its epic presentation as a farcical aspect of the class war. Wuolijoki translated Brecht's play into Finnish for the competition but it did not win a prize. The two authors agreed that Wuolijoki could develop the Finnish version for production throughout Scandinavia (for which she renamed the protagonist "Johannes Iso-Heikkilä"), while Brecht could negotiate performances anywhere else, where the royalties would be split equally between them.

== Production history ==
A theatrical production of the play became a priority for Brecht on his return from exile in 1947; he helped to direct its premiere at the Schauspielhaus Zürich, where it opened on 5 June 1948, with scenic design by Teo Otto. Leonard Steckel played Puntila and Gustav Knuth played Matti. Brecht chose Puntila for the opening production of the first season of the Berliner Ensemble, the world-renowned theatre company that he founded in 1949 in East Germany with his wife, Helene Weigel. Brecht co-directed this production with Erich Engel; Puntila was played initially by Leonard Steckel (as with the Zurich production), then by the comedian Curt Bois. The composer Paul Dessau wrote a musical setting for the songs for this production, while Casper Neher designed the sets. Brecht introduced the linking "Puntila Song" and decided to discourage the audience's empathy towards Puntila by means of defamiliarising masks for him and all the bourgeois characters. This production was seen by Wuolijoki.

== Adaptations ==
Brecht's play was adapted for the 1960 Austrian film Herr Puntila and His Servant Matti, and again for the 1979 Finnish-Swedish film of the same name.

It is also the source of a 1966 opera by Dessau.

Denise Mina adapted the play for a 2020 production in Edinburgh, relocating the action from early 20th-century rural Finland to a Scotland that is a blend of past and present, and gender-switching the character of Puntila from Mr to Mrs.

== Sources ==
- Willett, John and Ralph Manheim, eds. 1994. Collected Plays: Six. By Bertolt Brecht. Bertolt Brecht: Plays, Poetry, Prose Ser. London: Methuen. ISBN 0-413-68580-2.
