= Wolfgang Rosenthal =

Germanoral surgeon and singer

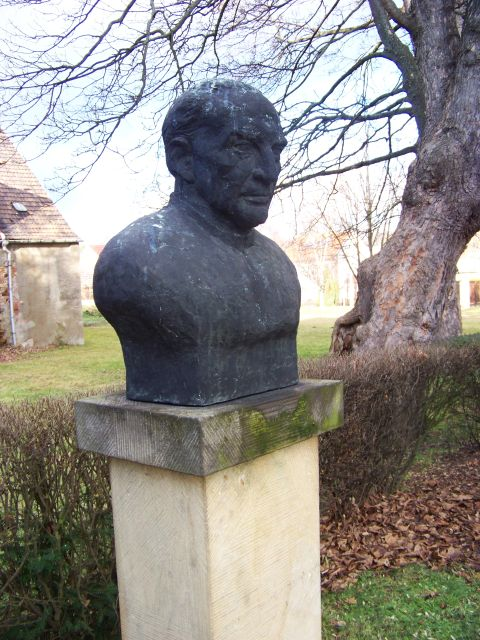
- Born: 8 September 1882; Friedrichshagen (Berlin), German Empire
- Died: 10 June 1971 (aged 88); Berlin, Germany
- Occupations: Surgeon; Bass-baritone
- Political party: NSDAP; SPD; SED
- Spouses: Ilse Helling-Rosenthal (1914); Marta Adam-Rosenthal (1943)

Wolfgang Rosenthal (8 September 1882 – 10 June 1971) was a German oral surgeon. Until the mid-1930s, he also pursued a parallel career as a bass-baritone singer.

After the destructive bombing of the Saint John's Church in Leipzig, it became necessary to identify the physical remains of Johann Sebastian Bach before they could be reburied at the Thomaskirche nearby: Rosenthal was able to combine his knowledge of anatomy with his insights (confirmed by further anatomical investigations) into the physical effect of a lifetime of organ playing on a musician's legs to provide the necessary identification.

== Life ==
=== Early years ===
Rosenthal was born in Friedrichshagen, the youngest of his parents' three recorded children and their only son, in a suburb on the north side of Berlin. He grew up in Weißenfels, an industrial town some 30 km (18 miles) south of Halle. His father, Max Friedrich Karl Martin Rosenthal, was a school head. His mother, born Johanna Ottilie Sidonie von Zeuner, came from an impoverished Swedish-Pomeranian aristocratic family. Both parents were musical: his father played the violin and his mother was an excellent pianist. Wolfgang's musical talent was strongly encouraged and, in 1896, he was sent away to Leipzig to join the Thomanerchor, with which he continued to sing for the next eight years. His parents hoped that singing in the choir and studying at the school attached to it would help cure his stuttering.

=== Career choices ===
His parents left Wolfgang to choose his own career, and in 1902 to 1903, he started to study for a law degree course at the Ludwig-Maximilians-Universität München. However, after visiting South Africa with his elder sister, Else, who was planning to get married in Bethusalia, Wolfgang was introduced by the family of his future brother-in-law to the business of agriculture. This evidently persuaded him that his choice of a law degree had been a mistake. He returned to Leipzig University in 1904 where he simultaneously studied singing and medicine, this time persisting with his chosen subjects.

==== Medical ====
Rosenthal received his doctorate in 1910. His dissertation concerned symptoms of late stage congenital syphilis He received his practicing certificate (Approbationsordnung) the next year. Between 1911 and 1914, he worked as an assistant doctor at the Leipzig Surgical-polyclinic Institute, where he was trained in surgery and also, through extensive cooperation with the adjacent dental clinic, developed a close understanding of the interface between oral surgery and dentistry. On the outbreak of the First World War in August 1914, he took over leadership of the institute when his boss went immediately to the front-line. Then, from May 1915 till 191,8 he headed the Jaw Hospital of the Saxon Corps, still based in Leipzig. In 1918, he received his habilitation (an advanced level academic-medical qualification) at Leipzig for a piece of experience-based work on plastic surgery.

==== Musical ====
His training as a concert and oratorio baritone was filled out with lessons from Robert Leideritz in Leipzig and then in Weimar with Karl Scheidemantel. Under the artist name "Wolfgang Zeuner-Rosenthal" he was much in demand for bass-baritone parts in concert and oratorio performances in Leipzig, to the point at which in November 1913 he abandoned his university medical studies to be able to spend more time on his musical career. He never abandoned medicine, however, broadening his experience of cancer treatments at the Heideberg Samaritan Centre under Vincenz Czerny, and then undertaking further medical work at the private clinic of Dr.Karl Schulze in Saalfeld, undertaking work which could be combined with his singing duties.

=== First marriage ===
During rehearsals for Haydn's Creation Rosenthal got to know the talented soprano Ilse Helling who shared his love of music but keenly supported him in his wish not to abandon medicine entirely. The two of them were married in the Leipzig Thomaskirche on 8 June 1914, after which they moved and began their married life at Bad Blankenburg, a short distance to the west of Leipzig.

There is a story, apparently advanced by a member of the Leipzig medical establishment called W. Hoffmann-Axthelm, that the marriage ended in divorce in 1937. The divorce theory is robustly refuted in other sources, but the marriage nevertheless ended in tragic circumstances in March 1939 when Leipzig was hit by a serious flu outbreak. Ilse caught the flu which degenerated into pneumonia from which she died on 23 March 1939.

=== Career ===
Rosenthal pursued his singing career till 1938. Although he continued to perform in a range of settings, the focus of his singing was the Rosenthal Quartet which enjoyed considerable success. In addition to Wolfgang Rosenthal the quartet comprised his wife Ilse Helling-Rosenthal, the contralto Marta Adam (who much later became Rosenthal's second wife) and the tenor Hans Lissmann (tenor).

The singing career came to an end because of a government ban. In January 1933 a new government had taken power, and the Adolf Hitler lost little time in moving the country towards one- party dictatorship. Government policy and the leader's personal philosophy were grounded in a peculiarly murderous brand of anti-semitism which later led to the Holocaust. Rosenthal had been baptised into the Evangelical Church on 26 December 1882 as Wolfgang Wilhelm Johannes (Rosenthal). All of his male Rosenthal ancestors had been baptised into the church since 1849. Nevertheless, a great-grandfather had been a synagogue cantor in the first part of the nineteenth century and "Rosenthal" was often a Jewish name.

In 1919, Rosenthal also took a position as a surgeon at the St George's Hospital in Leipzig. Then, in 1921, he opened his own private surgical clinic nearby. Between 1930 and 1936, he was also an "irregular professor" for surgery at Leipzig University. In parallel with this, between 1931 and 1933, he studied dentistry at Leipzig University, passing his medical exams at Erlangen and becoming registered as a Doctor of Dentistry.

=== Politics and race ===
In 1933, Rosenthal joined the ruling NSDAP (Nazi Party) and became a Sponsoring Member of the SS, which will have done his career no harm.

From 1936 to 1937, he worked as associate professor for physiology and facial surgery, and acting head of the jaw clinic at the University of Hamburg. On 30 September 1937, however, he was dismissed, possibly on account of his partially Jewish ancestry. His grandfather, Johannes Joseph Rosenthal had been baptised in an evangelical church in Berlin in June 1849, but Johannes Joseph's father had been a cantor in the Jewish community in Ballenstedt. Also in 1937, Rosenthal's teaching certificates in respect of Hamburg and Leipzig were voided. However, he was able to return to his career as a freelance surgeon and orthopedist. He went back to Leipzig and set about rebuilding his medical practice to which, following his singing ban in 1938, he was able to dedicate himself more fully than before. In 1943, he was able to prove that a remoter biological ancestor along the Rosenthal line (Prince Martin von Schönborn) had not been Jewish, but the teaching ban was not lifted. 1943 was also the year in which his Leipzig clinic was destroyed by enemy bombing. This provided the impetus for the creation of a new clinic at the schloss of Thallwitz in the countryside to the east of Leipzig, of which he remained the director until 1962. The castle was made available by its owner, the Prince of Reuss, who subsequently disappeared and probably died in a Soviet concentration camp.

=== The German Democratic Republic ===
The Second World War ended in defeat for Germany in May 1945, and with that ended the twelve Nazi years and a national policy driven by anti-Semitism. It also seemed reasonable to assume that the end of the Hitler regime meant an end to one-party dictatorship. The entire central part of what had been Germany, including Leipzig and Castle Thallwitz, now became designated as the Soviet occupation zone: this was part of a larger scheme of border changes and other territorial provisions agreed by the political leaders of the victorious powers at the Yalta Conference. Rosenthal joined the Social Democratic Party (SPD) in 1945.

While the zone was still under Soviet Military Administration, in April 1946, the way was opened for a return to one-party dictatorship, through the contentious merger of the no longer illegal German Communist Party (KPD) with the more moderately left wing (SPD). At the time of the merger, there was much talk of future political parity between members of the two component parties, but by the time that the Soviet occupation zone was reinvented, formally in October 1949, as the Soviet sponsored German Democratic Republic, leading SPD politicians who had been part of the merged Socialist Unity Party (SED, Sozialistische Einheitspartei Deutschlands) had in one way or another disappeared from active politics and the new party was in most respects the old Communist Party with a new name. Rosenthal's SPD membership had in the meantime been signed across to the SED, making him once more a member of the ruling party in a one-party state. Professionally, however, the Germany ruled under Walter Ulbricht restored important opportunities in the academic world that had been denied him under Hitler. He was again permitted to teach, and between 1945 and 1950, he was a teaching professor of oral surgery at the Humboldt University of Berlin. In 1950, by now in his 68th year, he became a full professor of oral surgery at the Humboldt University of Berlin and at the same time Director of the Clinic for Oral and Maxillofacial Diseases. Between 1951 and 1954, he was vice-dean, and then dean at the Faculty of Medicine. On 2 July 1952, he became the first chairman of the Society for Dental, Oral and Maxillofacial Medicine. On 1 September 1957, now in his mid-70s, Rosenthal retired, according to some sources in connection with his perceived "political unreliability" at a time when the political leadership of the country was still going through a period of nervousness in the wake of the crushed uprising of 1953 and in the unsettling context of historical re-evaluations coming out of The Kremlin. The assessment concerning Rosenthal's political unreliability seems to have been the result of informant reports received by the Ministry for State Security. He was replaced at his Thallwitz Clinic in September 1962 by Dr Wolfgang Bethman.

He suffered a fall in his work room at his home in February 1971 and broke his femur. During summer 1971, Rosenthal died in a Berlin hospital from the complications following the break. He was buried beside his first wife, the singer Ilse Helling-Rosenthal, in the Leipzig South Cemetery.

== Contribution ==
Rosenthal's contribution to medicine was wide-ranging. One area in which he made a particular difference over many years was that of cleft lip and palate treatment. Over the years he developed new operations and treatment methods to optimize through reconstruction both the functionality and the appearance of affected mouth parts. Methods he developed are identified by the name "Schönborn-Rosenthal".

In the 1920s, Rosenthal was already advocating an inter-disciplinary collaboration involving surgeons, dentists, orthopaedists, "ear, nose and throat" doctors and speech therapists, to ensure that functional reconstruction be incorporated into a programme designed to ensure proper swallowing and speech capabilities. Close collaboration involving, in addition, plastic surgeons should make possible correspondingly visually satisfactory outcomes.

At the same time he would oppose discrimination, vilification or other verbal denigration of sufferers.

== Honours and commemoration ==
In 1951, Rosenthal was made an honorary member of the American Cleft Palate Association. In the German Democratic Republic, he was awarded, in the same year, the title Verdienter Arzt des Volkes (Honoured Doctor of the People). In 1955, he received the National Prize of East Germany, and he was honoured as an Outstanding Scientist of the People in 1962.

The medical faculty at Leipzig University gave him an honorary doctorate in 1955. In 1955, he became a full life-member of the Academy of Sciences Leopoldina. In 1962, he was given honorary citizenship of the little municipality at Thallwitz.

The East German Institute of Oral Medicine created an annual prize, the Wolfgang Rosenthal Prize, in 1968, and from 1982 there was also a Wolfgang Rosenthal Medal.

The Wolfgang Rosenthal Society, committed to self-help by and for people with mouth deformities, was established at Hüttenberg and named after him in 1981.
