= Ernst Roeder =

German writer (1862–1897)

Ernst Roeder (17 March 1862 – 29 April 1897) was a 19th-century German writer and contributing editor. He occasionally used the pseudonym Rotteck, E(rnst).

== Life ==
Born in Schmelz, Roeder was the son of a forestry official. He spent his childhood mainly with his grandparents in Hausbach bei Losbach. After attending the higher citizen's school in Saarlouis, he graduated from the trade school in Saarbrücken and finally studied economics, history and literary history in Dresden. After his studies, he temporarily worked in the trade sector until he got a civil service post in Saint-Louis, Haut-Rhin. In Spring 1883, Roeder moved back to Dresden, where he became editor of the magazine Deutsches Dichterheim, an organ for poetry and criticism.

In 1886, he left this post and became an employee of the Dresdner Anzeiger, later published by Henry Hugo Pierson (1848-1919) Neuen poetischen Blättern.

Until his death in spring 1897, Roeder was chairman of a "Verein zur Pflege der Literatur", the Litterarische Gesellschaft, of which the poet Adele Osterloh (1857-1946) was a member.

Roeder was married to the Italian violin virtuoso Adelaide Milanollo, born on 26 September 1872 in Upper Italy. The artist had achieved fame, among other things, because she was allowed to play before William I in 1888.

In July 1907, Adelaide Milanollo-Roeder gave up her position as a teacher at the Hochschule für Musik Carl Maria von Weber. She married her brother-in-law, the engineer Julius Roeder, a brother of her late husband, and from 1 September 1907 she lived with him in Bous (Saar).

Roeder died in Dresden at the age of 35.

== Publications ==
- Das Dresdner Hoftheater der Gegenwart. Biographisch-kritische Skizzen der Mitglieder; Neue Folge. Dresden 1896
- Die "Alte Stadt" auf der Ausstellung des sächsischen Handwerks und Kunstgewerbes in Dresden. In :Illustrirte Zeit, 25 July 1896, p. 98
- Leben. Gedichte, 1882
- Junges Leben. 2nd edition 1884
- Was das Heimchen zirpt. 1884
- Gedichte 1886
- Märzveilchen, Gedicht, 1888
