= Lotte Wolf-Matthäus =

German contralto (1908–1979)

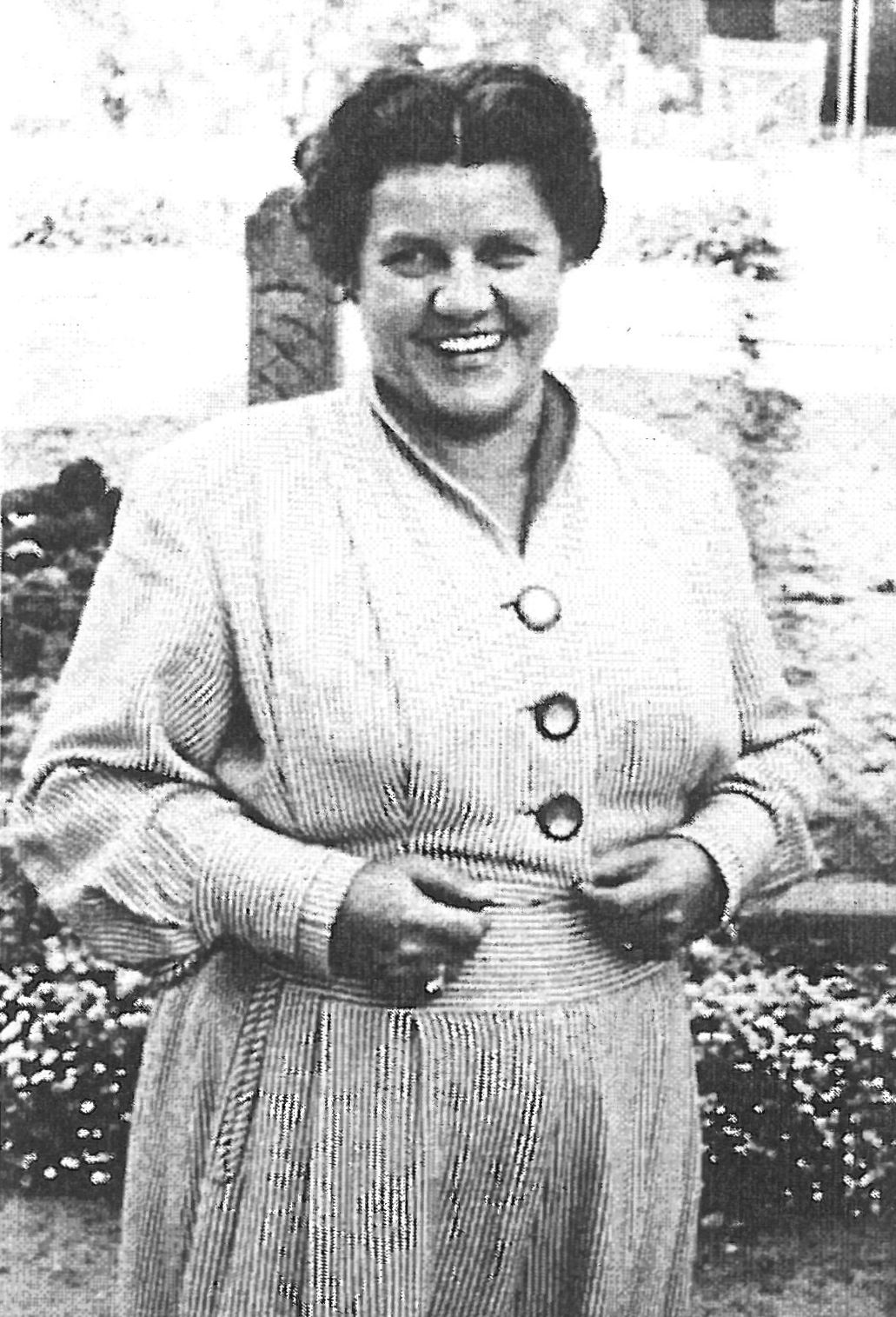
- Born: 8 April 1908; Brünlos, Germany
- Died: 12 November 1979 (aged 71); Ilten, Germany
- Occupation: Classical contralto

Lotte Wolf-Matthäus (8 April 1908 – 12 November 1979) was a German contralto singer, who focused on the works by Johann Sebastian Bach.

Born in Brünlos (now part of Zwönitz), she studied voice at the Landeskonservatorium Leipzig with Ilse Helling-Rosenthal from 1926 to 1930. She appeared in 1929 at the Thomaskirche, performing the alto part of Bach's Christmas Oratorio with the Thomanerchor conducted by Karl Straube. She focused on Bach's works, collaborating in performances and recordings with Günther Ramin, Rudolf Mauersberger and Karl Ristenpart, among others.

She died in Ilten.
