= Mary Hagen =

German soprano

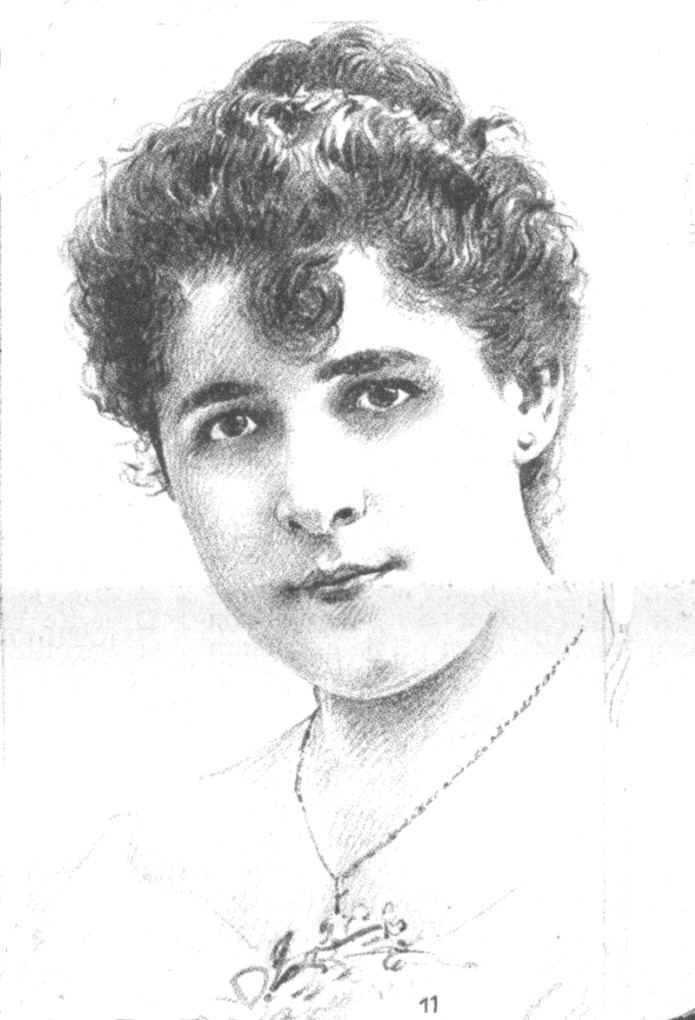
Mary Hagen (by Jan Vilímek, 1902)

Mary Hagen (real name Marie Anna Wilhelmine Schön; 27 May 1876 – 12 November 1944) was a German operatic soprano and actress.

== Life ==
Born in Diez, Hagenwar was a student of Etelka Gerster, Conrad Muschler and Selma Nicklass-Kempner.

First performances were booked in 1896 at the Wilhelm Theatre in Magdeburg, engagements in Kiel, Aachen and Görlitz followed. During this time, she devoted herself more to operetta and in 1898 she appeared at the Central-Theater (Berlin). 1900 followed engagements at the Königsstädtisches Theater, at the Theater an der Wien in Vienna and in Berlin at the Theater des Westens and the Komische Oper Berlin. Her change to the field of highly dramatic soprano for corresponding Wagner roles was not very successful.

Hagen is documented as an actress in the film Zigeunerblut by Urban Gad from 1911 in the role of Baroness Leonie Korff.

After the end of her singing career she settled down as a singing teacher. Since 1912 she was married to the music critic Leopold Schmidt, who worked in Berlin for the Berliner Tageblatt. She spent the last part of her life in the Emmy Göring convent in Weimar.

== Roles ==
- Féodora – Der Opernball (Richard Heuberger)
- Nelly – Der Obersteiger (Carl Zeller)
- Molly – The Geisha (Sidney Jones)
- Adele – Die Fledermaus (Johann Strauss II)
- Orlowsky – Die Fledermaus (Johann Strauss)
- Mirzl – Das verwunschene Schloss (Karl Millöcker)
