= Marta Adam =

German contralto

- Born: 27 August 1895; Leipzig, Germany
- Education: Leipzig Conservatory
- Occupation: Classical contralto]
- Organizations: Rosenthal-Quartett
- Spouse: Wolfgang Rosenthal

Mart(h)a Adam (born 27 August 1895) was a German contralto and voice teacher who appeared exclusively in lied and oratorio. She formed a vocal quartet, the Rosenthal-Quartett, with soprano Ilse Helling-Rosenthal, tenor Hans Lißmann and her later husband Wolfgang Rosenthal as the bass, performing in Europe.

== Life ==
Adam was born in Leipzig in a musical family. The composer Johann Georg Adam was among her ancestors. Her father owned a factory, and her mother was a piano teacher. She received her vocal training at the Leipzig Conservatory with Marie Hedmondt.

She formed a vocal quartet in Leipzig in 1919, the Rosenthal-Quartet, with soprano Ilse Helling-Rosenthal, tenor Hans Lißmann and her later husband, bass Wolfgang Rosenthal. The vocal ensemble performed in Europe with great success. In 1918, they performed the Liebesliederwalzer by Johannes Brahms, and a reviewer noted the beauty and blending of their voices. On 11 March 1920, they were the soloists in a concert at the Gewandhaus, with Arthur Nikisch conducting Bruckner's Te Deum; the organist was Karl Straube. The quartet was dissolved by the Nazi regime.

She married Wolfgang Rosenthal in 1943. It is not known when and where she died, but Kerstin Ackermann cites a letter Martha Rosenthal (Adam) wrote on 7 December 1971.
