= Ilse Helling-Rosenthal =

German soprano (1886–1939)

- Born: Sophie Marie Ilse Helling; 15 February 1886; Leipzig, Germany
- Died: 23 March 1939 (aged 53); Leipzig, Germany
- Education: Leipzig Conservatory
- Occupations: Classical soprano; Academic teacher
- Organizations: Rosenthal-Quartet
- Spouse: Wolfgang Rosenthal

Sophie Marie Ilse Helling-Rosenthal (15 February 1886 – 23 March 1939) was a German soprano singer and voice teacher who appeared primarily in lied and oratorio. She formed a vocal quartet, the Rosenthal-Quartet, with her husband Wolfgang Rosenthal as the bass, contralto Marta Adam and tenor Hans Lißmann.

== Life ==
Born in Leipzig, Helling was the daughter of the Leipzig merchant Traugott Iwan Helling and his wife Helene, née Schmidt. She received her vocal training at the Leipzig Conservatory with Marie Hedmondt.

She became a voice teacher at the Leipzig Conservatory. On 8 June 1914, she married Wolfgang Rosenthal, a physician and bass-baritone, at the Thomaskirche in Leipzig. The couple moved to Bad Blankenburg. With him, she formed in Leipzig the Rosenthal-Quartet in 1919, including the contralto Marta Adam and the tenor Hans Lißmann. The vocal ensemble performed in Europe with great success. In 1918, they performed the Liebesliederwalzer by Johannes Brahms, and a reviewer noted the beauty and blending of their voices. On 11 March 1920, they were the soloists in a concert at the Gewandhaus, with Arthur Nikisch conducting Bruckner's Te Deum; the organist was Karl Straube.

She appeared in 1918 as the soprano soloist in a performance of Bach's St Matthew Passion in Cologne, and of Handel's Messiah at the Johanniskirche in Dessau. In 1931, Helling-Rosenthal recorded Bach's cantata Sie werden euch in den Bann tun, BWV 44, for the radio, with the Thomanerchor and the Gewandhausorchester conducted by Straube.

Her pupils included Erna Hähnel, Lotte Wolf-Matthäus (1926–1930), and her daughter Hella Ebert-Rosenthal.

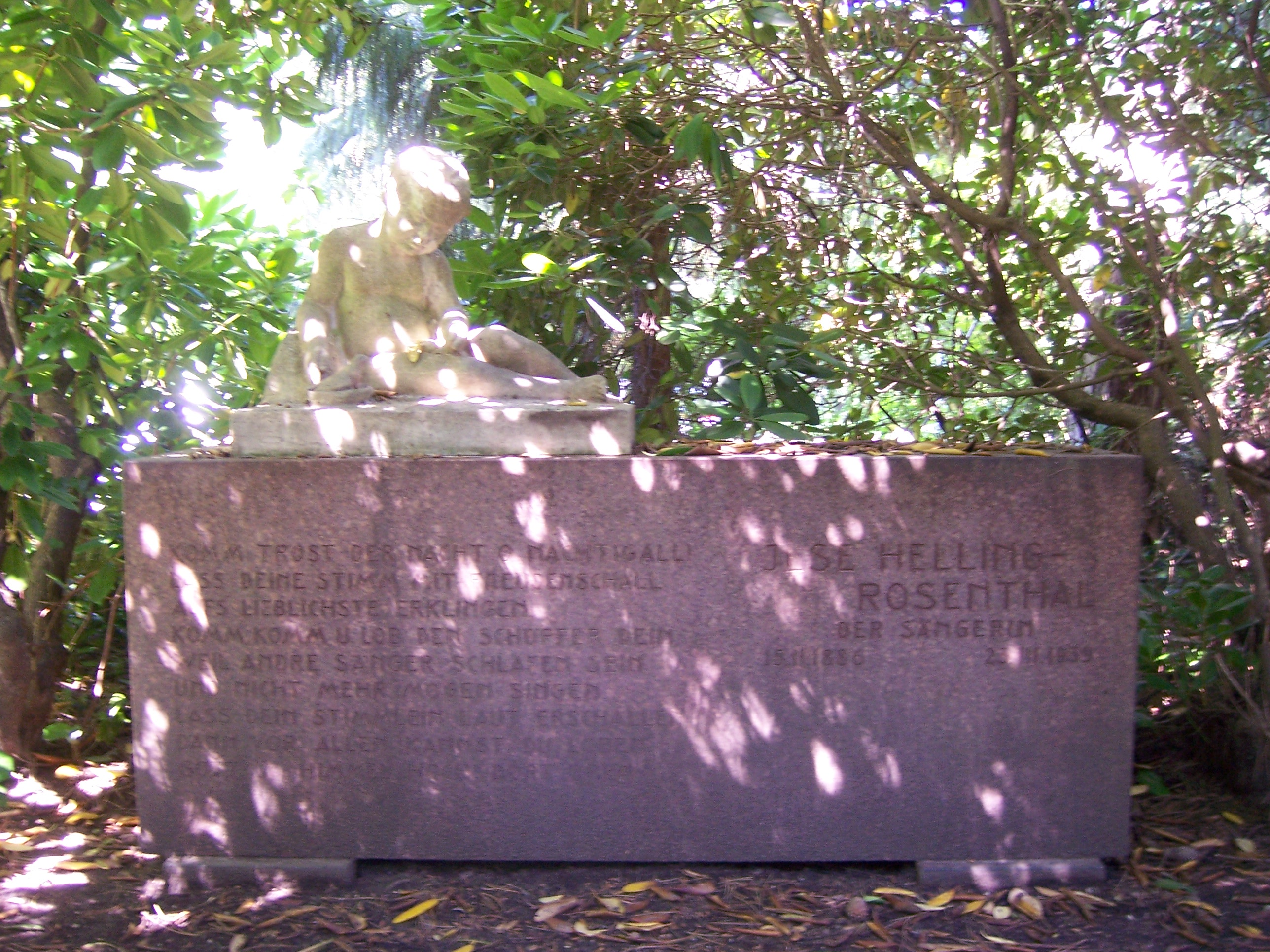
Grave in Leipzig's Südfriedhof

Helling-Rosenthal died at the age of 53 of pneumonia during an epidemic in Leipzig. She was buried at the Südfriedhof.
