= Konrad Rupf =

German bass-baritone (1929–2013)

- Born: 23 May 1929; Pöhlau, Saxony, Germany
- Died: 29 April 2013 (aged 83); Chemnitz, Saxony, Germany
- Education: Musikhochschule Weimar; Musikhochschule Berlin
- Occupations: Operatic bass-baritone; Academic teacher
- Organizations: Opernhaus Chemnitz; Leipzig Opera; Musikhochschule Leipzig
- Title: Kammersänger

Konrad Rupf (23 May 1929 – 29 April 2013) was a German operatic bass-baritone and teacher. He made his debut in 1955 at the Staatstheater Cottbus, moved to the Opernhaus Chemnitz in 1958, to the Leipzig Opera in 1980, and made guest appearances around Europe. He performed a repertoire of 127 roles, including title roles from Handel's Poro to Gershwin's Porgy and Bess and Paul Dessau's Puntila, and roles in world premieres. He taught voice at the Musikhochschule Leipzig from 1980 to 1990. His last leading role was Tevje in Fiddler on the Roof, which premiered in 2000.

== Life ==
Born in Pöhlau near Zwickau, Rupf first received private singing lessons in Weimar and studied voice at the Musikhochschule Weimar. He completed his studies at the Musikhochschule Berlin with J. M. Hauschild. He received his first permanent engagement in 1955 at the Staatstheater Cottbus where he made his debut as Dulcamara in Donizetti's L'elisir d'amore. He remained there until 1958, appearing in 21 roles.

Rupf moved to the Opernhaus Chemnitz, where he performed both serious and buffo roles, including Osmin in Mozart's Die Entführung aus dem Serail, Sarastro in Die Zauberflöte, Leporello in Don Giovanni, Don Pizarro in Beethoven's Fidelio, Kaspar in Weber's Der Freischütz, Hans Sachs in Wagner's Die Meistersinger von Nürnberg, and title roles in Handel's Poro, re dell'Indie, Hindemith's Mathis der Maler, Gershwin's Porgy and Bess and Paul Dessau's Puntila.

In 1980, he was engaged by the Leipzig Opera, where he remained until 1994. His roles there included Hans Sachs, Marke in Wagner's Tristan und Isolde, Gurnemanz in Parsifal for the 1982/83 season, and Don Alfonso in Mozart's Così fan tutte. He officially retired in 1994, and was made an honorary member of the Leipzig Opera.

Rupf's repertoire comprised 127 opera roles. He made several guest appearances at the Staatsoper Dresden. In March 1973, he performed there in the world premiere of Udo Zimmermann's Levins Mühle, and in 1999 as Feri von Kerekes in Léhar's Die Csárdásfürstin, directed by Peter Konwitschny. He appeared as a guest at the Komische Oper Berlin, such as Zaccaria in Verdi's Nabucco in 1988, at the Hungarian State Opera House (1977) and at the Slovak National Theatre. In July 1989, he appeared in the world premiere of Graf Mirabeau by Siegfried Matthus at the Berlin State Opera. In 1993, he was Hans Sachs again at the Teatro Lirico Giuseppe Verdi in Triest. In 1996, he appeared at the Anhaltisches Theater in Kurt Weill's Der Silbersee, and from 2000 until a final performance in 2003 as Tevje in Der Fiedler auf dem Dach at the Landesbühnen Sachsen.

Rupf was also a frequent concert singer. From 1980 to 1990, he held a teaching position at the Musikhochschule Leipzig. In 1980, he was awarded the title Kammersänger. In 1985 he received the National Prize of the GDR for outstanding vocal and performing achievements.

== Recordings ==
In 1971, Rupf sang the title role in Puccini's Gianni Schicchi in a complete German-language recording, conducted by Herbert Kegel, alongside Anna Tomowa-Sintow as Lauretta. In a studio recording of 1973, he sang the Doctor in Alban Berg's Wozzeck and in a live recording of this opera from the Hamburg State Opera conducted by Ingo Metzmacher, he was the First Craftsman. In 1974, he appeared in the children's audio play Pinocchios Abenteuer by Kurt Schwaen as the Fire-Eater; the recording was released in 1974 by Litera. He made recordings for the radio such as Adam in Fritz Geißler's Der zerbrochene Krug by Leipzig Radio in 1977.

== Personal life ==
Rupf lived in Chemnitz, where he died at the age of 83.
