= Uusna =

Village in Estonia

- Village
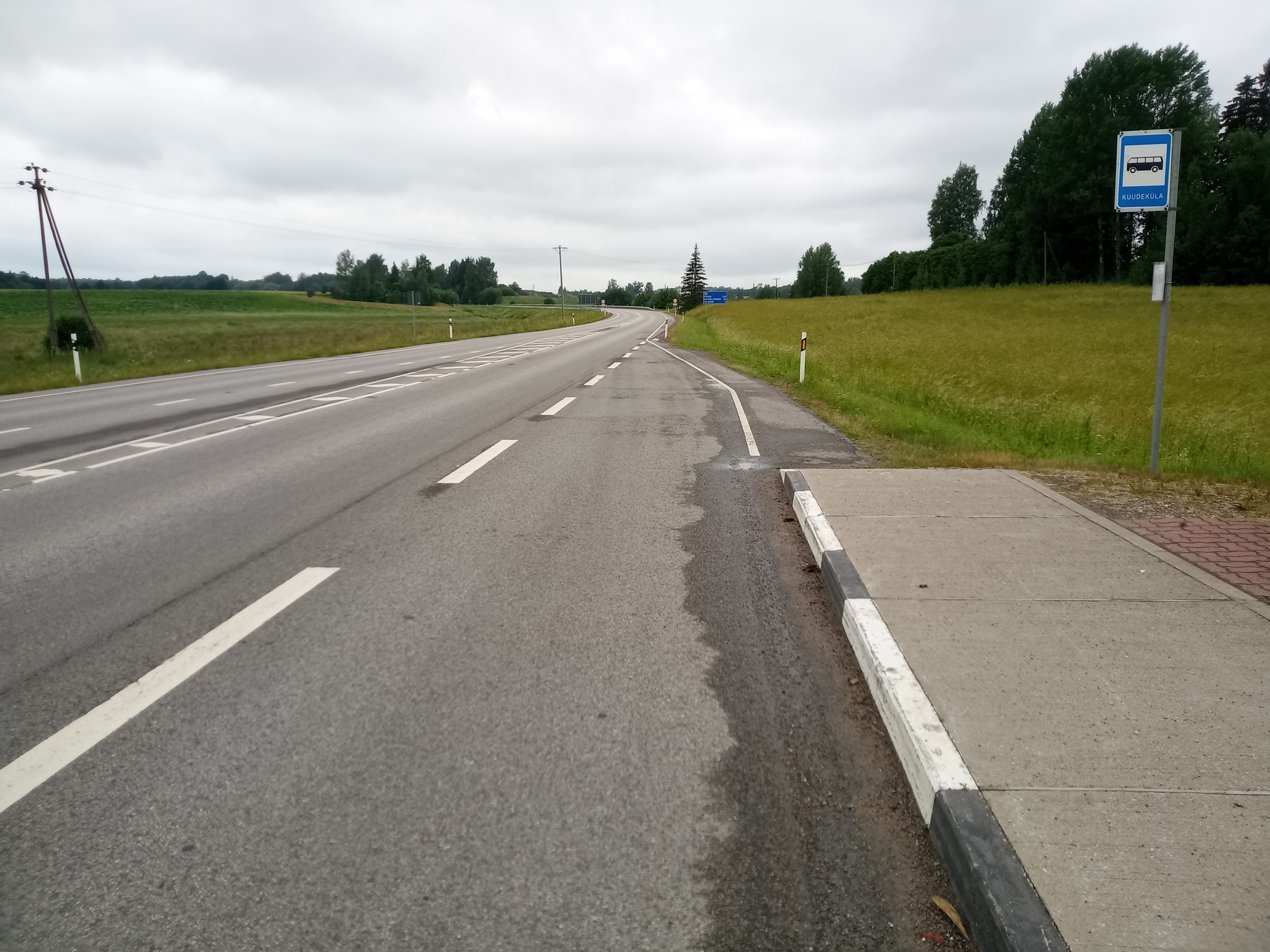
- Kuudeküla bus stop in Uusna

- Location in Estonia
- Coordinates: 58°23′12″N 25°44′45″E
- Country: Estonia
- County: Viljandi County
- Municipality: Viljandi Parish

Population (2011 Census)
  - Total: 336

Uusna is a village in Viljandi Parish, Viljandi County, in southern Estonia. As of the 2011 census, the settlement's population was 336. It was a part of Viiratsi Parish before 2013.

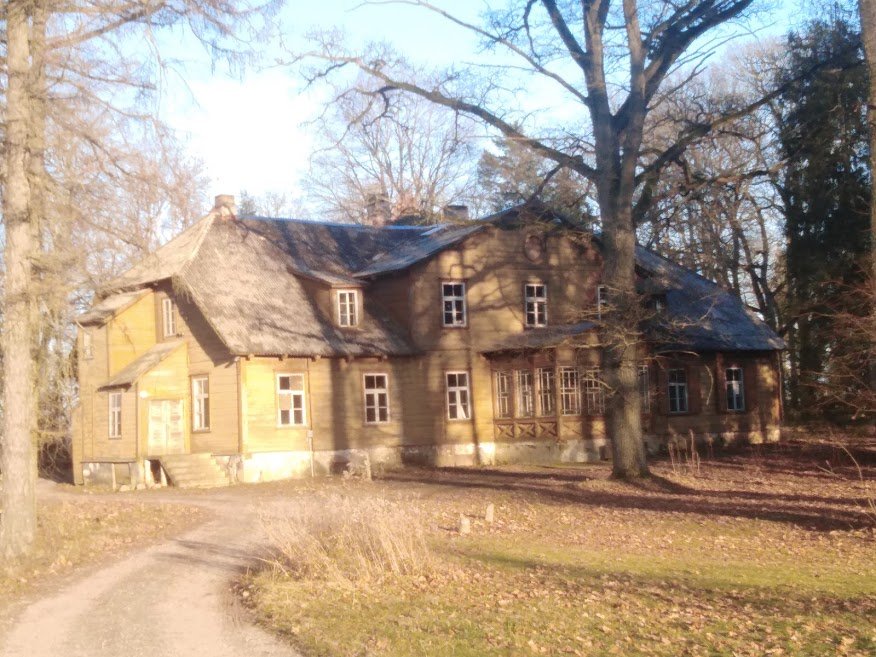
Uusna manor
