= Dresdner Anzeiger =

Former German newspaper

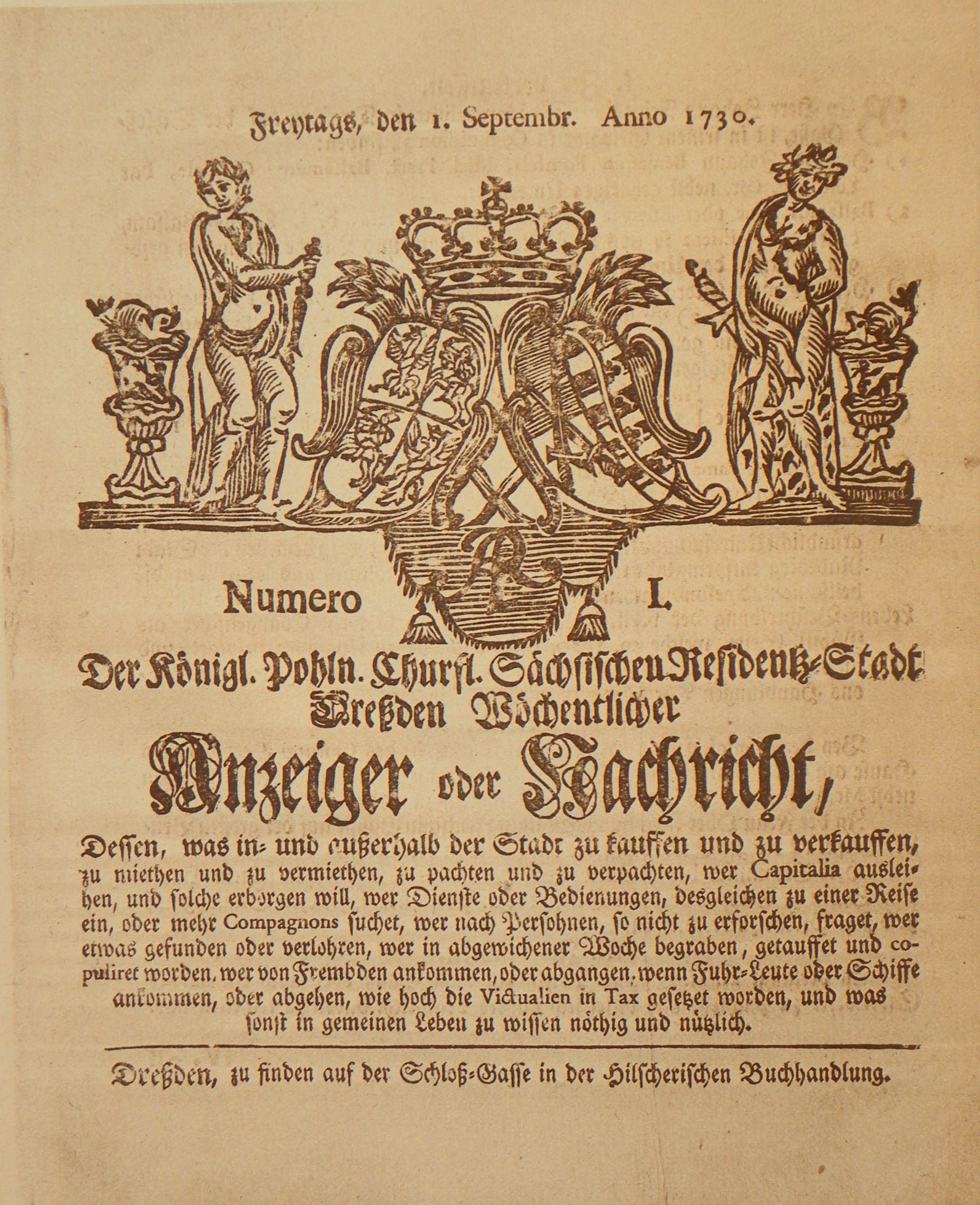
Title page of the first edition 1730

The Dresdner Anzeiger was probably the oldest, and in any case the longest (1730–1945) existing daily newspaper in Dresden.

The intellectual originator was the council auctioneer Johann Christian Crell, who on 30 March 1730 petitioned the king and elector Augustus II the Strong to give him the privilege for a weekly pennysaver, a "Frage- und Antwort-Zettul". The background to this was that Crell had already been writing handwritten news as the first periodical publications in Dresden from 1714 onwards.

Even before a decision was made, the bookseller and pastor's son Gottlob Christian Hilscher (1705–1748) had also submitted a request to the King and Elector on 20 August 1730, and was also granted the privilege at short notice. On 1 September 1730, he published the paper Der Königl. Pohln. Churfürstl. Sächsischen Residentz-Stadt Dreßden Wöchentlicher Anzeiger oder Nachricht in the meantime called Dresdner Anzeigen (Dresden Advertisements), later abbreviated to Dresdner Anzeiger (Dresden Gazette), which was ostensibly an advertising journal, but – according to the first issue – also reported "what else is necessary and useful to know in common life". In this way, the tradition of the "Intelligenzzettel", which had developed around 1720, was integrated into the paper. Crell, the actual originator of the idea, collaborated for a while (which gradually turned the "Anzeiger" into an information and announcement organ of the Dresden Council). The Anzeiger was distributed by the Hilschersche Buchhandlung in the Schloßstraße.

After Hilscher's death, the granted privilege went to various booksellers until Freiin von Schlichten inherited it in 1829. The managing power of attorney granted to his father in 1829 passed to his son in 1834: Justus Friedrich Güntz. The latter finally acquired the Dresdner Anzeiger in 1837, whose sole publisher he then became in 1839. Now the Dresdner Anzeiger finally became the official gazette of the city of Dresden.

Due to some strokes of fate, Güntz founded a private foundation under public law, the Güntz Foundation, to which he contributed the publishing privilege of the Dresdner Anzeiger and the proceeds of which fed the foundation.

After several changes of location, the Dresdner Anzeiger was published from 1900 onwards from its headquarters in Breite Straße. In 1943, it was forcibly merged by the Nazi authorities with the Dresdner Neuesten Nachrichten to form the Dresdner Zeitung, after the air raids on Dresden from 13 to 15 February 1945, the latter ceased publication. In 1951, the Güntz Foundation was also declared dissolved.
