= Hans Lissmann (tenor) =

German tenor (1885–1964)

Hans Lissmann, also Hans Lißmann, (19 September 1885 – 26 May 1964) was a German operatic tenor.

== Life ==
Born in Hamburg, Lissman was the son of the bass baritone Friedrich Heinrich Lissmann (1847–1894) and the soprano Anna Marie Lissmann-Gutzschbach (1847–1928). His sister Eva-Katharina Lissmann (1883–after 1917) was also a concert singer.

Lißmann studied Ochestral conducting, among others with Arthur Nikisch at the Hochschule für Musik und Theater "Felix Mendelssohn Bartholdy" Leipzig and at the Hochschule für Musik Carl Maria von Weber Dresden, and subsequently worked as a conductor at various German theatres. He received his vocal training with Raimund von Zur Mühlen in London and with Ernesto Colli in Milan.

in 1913 he came back to Germany. After a short engagement at the Hamburg Volksoper he was first lyrical tenor at the Opera in Leipzig from 1914 until 1933. There, he sang more than 100 parts, e.g. in 1919 in the world premiere of the opera Revolutionshochzeit by Eugen d’Albert and in 1927 in the world premiere of the opera Clavigo by Max Ettinger. He gave successful guest performances, such as Fenton in Verdi's Falstaff conducted by Arturo Toscanini in Roma, Belmonte in Die Entführung aus dem Serail under the direction of Thomas Beecham in London and at leading German theatres. Max von Schillings chose him as the singer for the world premiere of his opera Mona Lisa in Stuttgart.

In September 1933, he gave his highly acclaimed farewell performance in Leipzig as Alfredo in La traviata.

At the same time, Lissmann was a highly respected concert and lieder singer. In addition to his own concerts, he sang regularly in Leipzig under Thomaskantor Karl Straube the part of the Evangelist in the performances of Bach's St. Matthew Passion and Christmas Oratorio. Besides Wolfgang Rosenthal (bass-baritone), Ilse Helling-Rosenthal (soprano) and Marta Adam (alto) he was a tenor in the Rosenthal Quartet.

Lissmann was also active as a composer of songs and short operas as well as the opera Woe to him who lies! after Franz Grillparzer's eponymous Woe to him who lies! comedy.

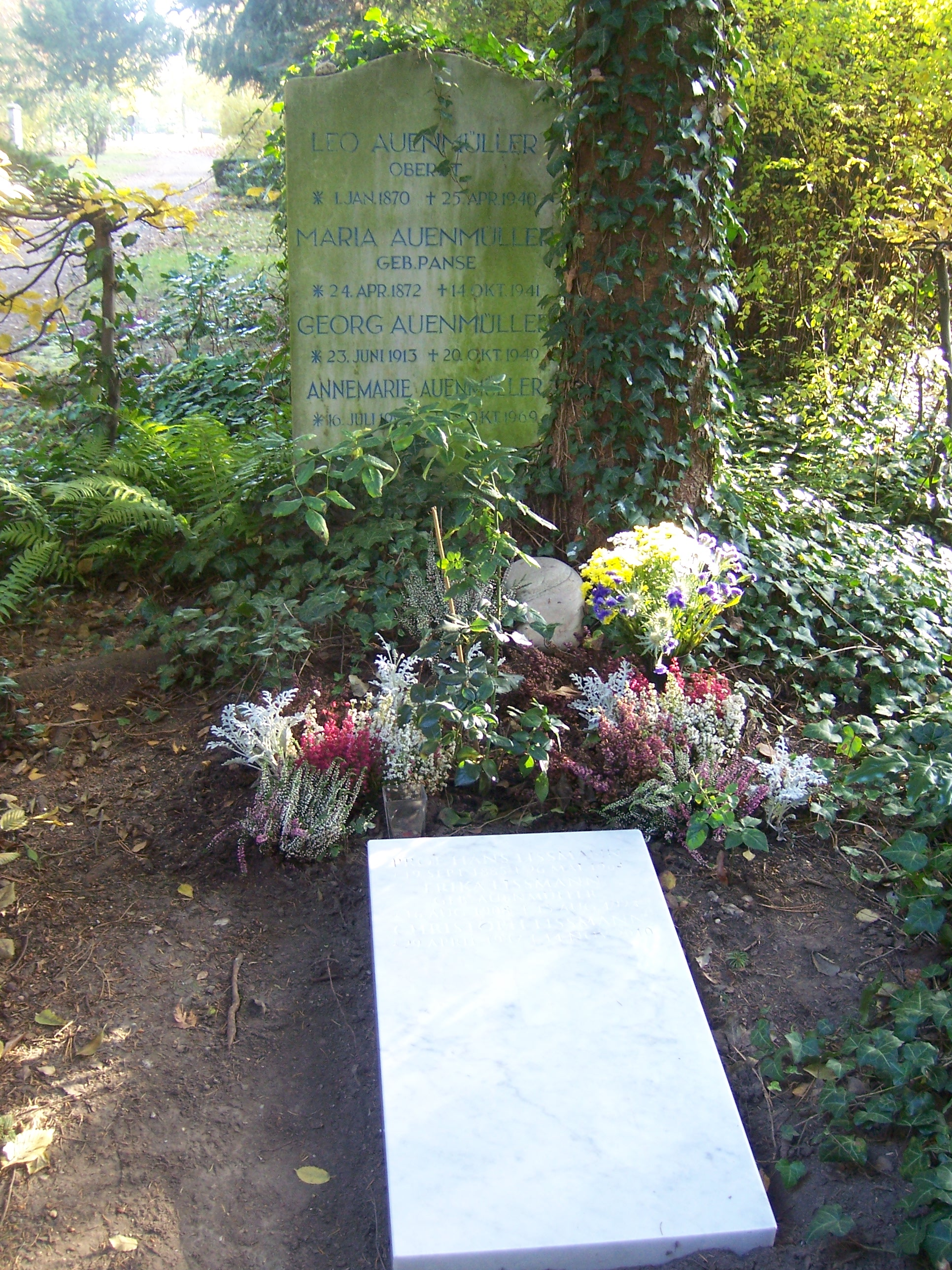
Grave of Hans Lissmann at the Südfriedhof in Leipzig.

He was married to Erika Auenmüller (1908–1973)

Lissmann was professor of singing at the Leipzig Conservatory between 1923 and 1954. Among his students were Reiner Süß and Rolf Apreck.

Since 1921 Lissmann was a member of the Leipzig masonic lodge "Minerva zu den drei Palmen". He was married to Erika Auenmüller (1908–1973).
