= Viiratsi Parish =

Former municipality of Estonia

Coordinates: 58°21′32″N 25°38′23″E

Viiratsi Parish Viiratsi vald
- Former municipality of Estonia
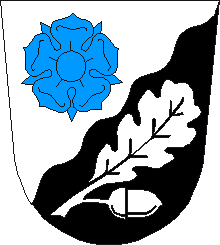
- Flag Coat of arms

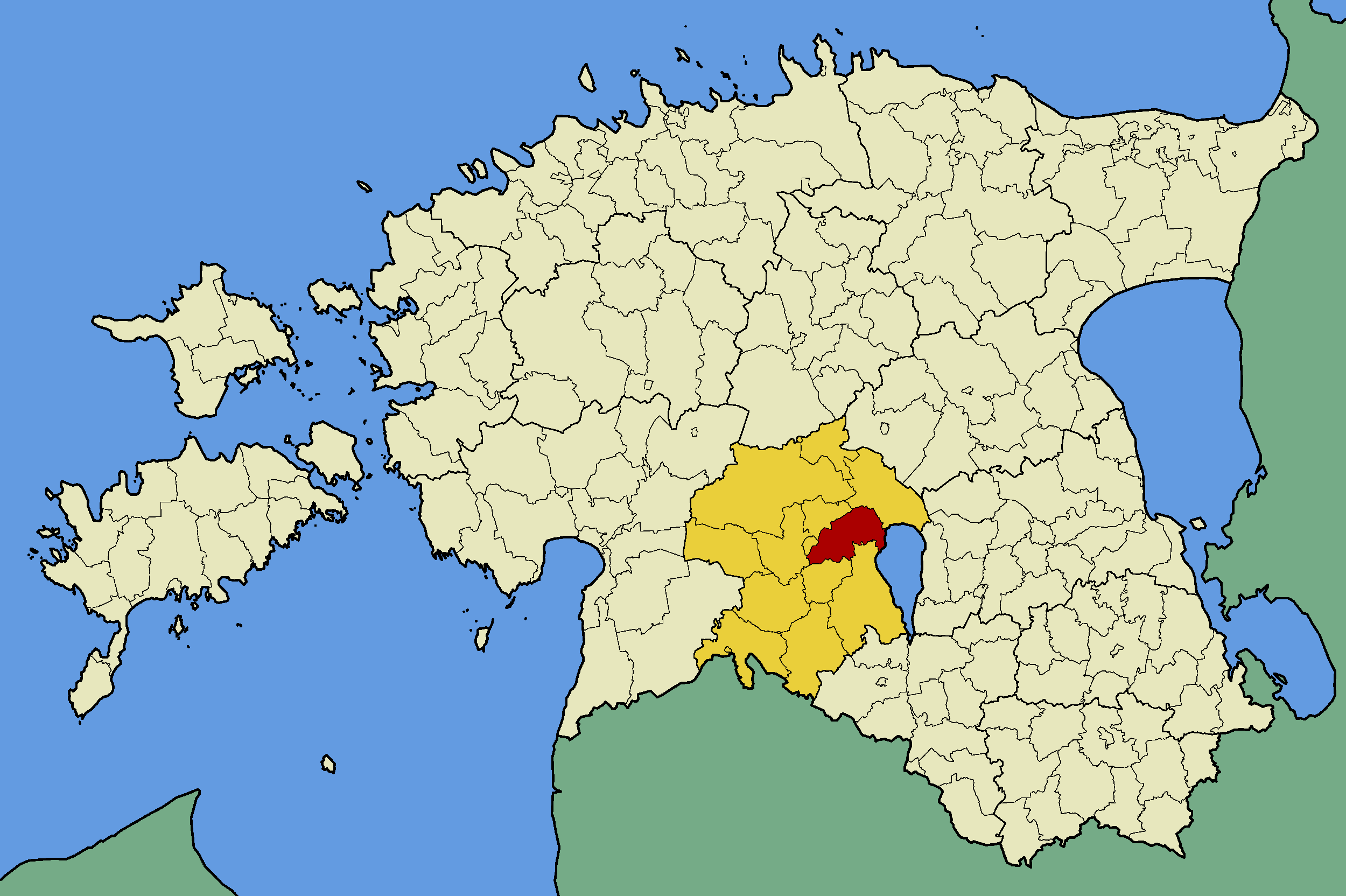
- Viiratsi Parish within Viljandi County in 2009.
- Country: Estonia
- County: Viljandi County
- Administrative centre: Viiratsi

Area
  - Total: 215.02 km^{2} (83.02 sq mi)

Population (01.01.2009)
  - Total: 3,743
  - Density: 17.41/km^{2} (45.09/sq mi)
- Website: www.viiratsi.ee

Viiratsi Parish (Estonian: Viiratsi vald) was a rural municipality of Estonia, in Viljandi County.

After the municipal elections held on 20 October 2013, Viiratsi Parish was merged with Paistu, Pärsti and Saarepeedi parishes to form a new Viljandi Parish around the town of Viljandi.

On 1 January 2009, it had a population of 3,743 and an area of 215.02 km^{2}.

== Settlements ==
Small borough
Viiratsi

Villages
- Jõeküla
- Kibeküla
- Kuudeküla
- Loime
- Mäeltküla
- Mähma
- Rebaste
- Ridaküla
- Ruudiküla
- Saareküla
- Surva
- Tänassilma
- Tusti
- Tõnuküla
- Uusna
- Valma
- Vana-Võidu
- Vanavälja
- Vardja
- Vasara
- Verilaske
