= Puntila (opera) =

Puntila is a 1959 opera by Paul Dessau 1956–1959, to a libretto by Peter Palitzsch and Manfred Wekwerth after the play Mr Puntila and his Man Matti by Brecht. It was premiered 15 November 1966.

== Recording ==
- Puntila - Reiner Süss, Kurt Rehm, Irmgard Arnold, Erich Witte, Gertrud Stilo, Hannerose Katterfield, dir Paul Dessau Staatskapelle Berlin & Chor des Deutschen Staatsoper Berlin 1969 5 139 280~81 SLPM (2 LP box)
