= Ignaz Eigner =

Austrian lithographer and painter

Ignaz Eigner, also Ignác and Ignácz (1854 – 1922) was an Austrian lithographer and painter.

== Life ==
Eigner was born in Budapest. At the age of 14 he came to the Academy of Fine Arts Vienna in 1868, where he remained for four years until 1872. After that, he became famous as a newspaper lithographer, especially for portraits of the Viennese society and for his portraits of the Habsburg imperial family.

== Work ==
- Alfred Schönwald: Oesterreichs Kaiserhaus. Biographische Gallerie sämmtlicher Glieder des Allerhöchsten Hofes. Portrits by Ignaz Eigner. Verlag Sommer, Vienna 1877. (contains 38 lithographs by Eigner)
- Blatt: Vom Kunsthimmel des Theaters an der Wien. Ein Blatt mit Porträts Wiener Schauspielerinnen von Ignaz Eigner, jetzt in der Sammlung Manskopf.

Further works can be found in the Bildarchiv Austria of the Austrian National Library.
