= Margarete Herzberg =

German mezzo-soprano

Margarete Herzberg (10 February 1921 – 29 March 2007) was a German operatic mezzo-soprano.

== Life ==
Born in Osnabrück, Herzberg studied singing at the Leipzig Conservatory with Gertrud Bartsch.

The mezzo-soprano belonged to the ensemble of the Landestheater Altenburg. Later, Herzberg belonged together with Philine Fischer, Günther Leib, Werner Enders, Helmuth Kaphahn and others to the ensemble of the Handel Festival, Halle. She was awarded the first Handel Prize in 1956 together with the collective of the first Poro production of the Handel Festival under the musical direction of Horst-Tanu Margraf. Herzberg was engaged at the Rostock People's Theatre and later freelanced.

Herzberg sang Abigail in Verdi's Nabucco at the Leipzig Opera, accompanied by the Leipzig Gewandhaus Orchestra under Rolf Reuter, and in Weimar and Dessau Salome in Richard Strauss' eponymous opera. Her repertoire included Ortrud (Wagner's Lohengrin), Cherubino (Mozart's The marriage of Figaro), Venus (Richard Wagner's Tannhäuser), Oktavian (Richard Strauss' Der Rosenkavalier), the lead title Carmen (Georges Bizet), Hänsel (Humperdinck's Hänsel und Gretel) and many others.

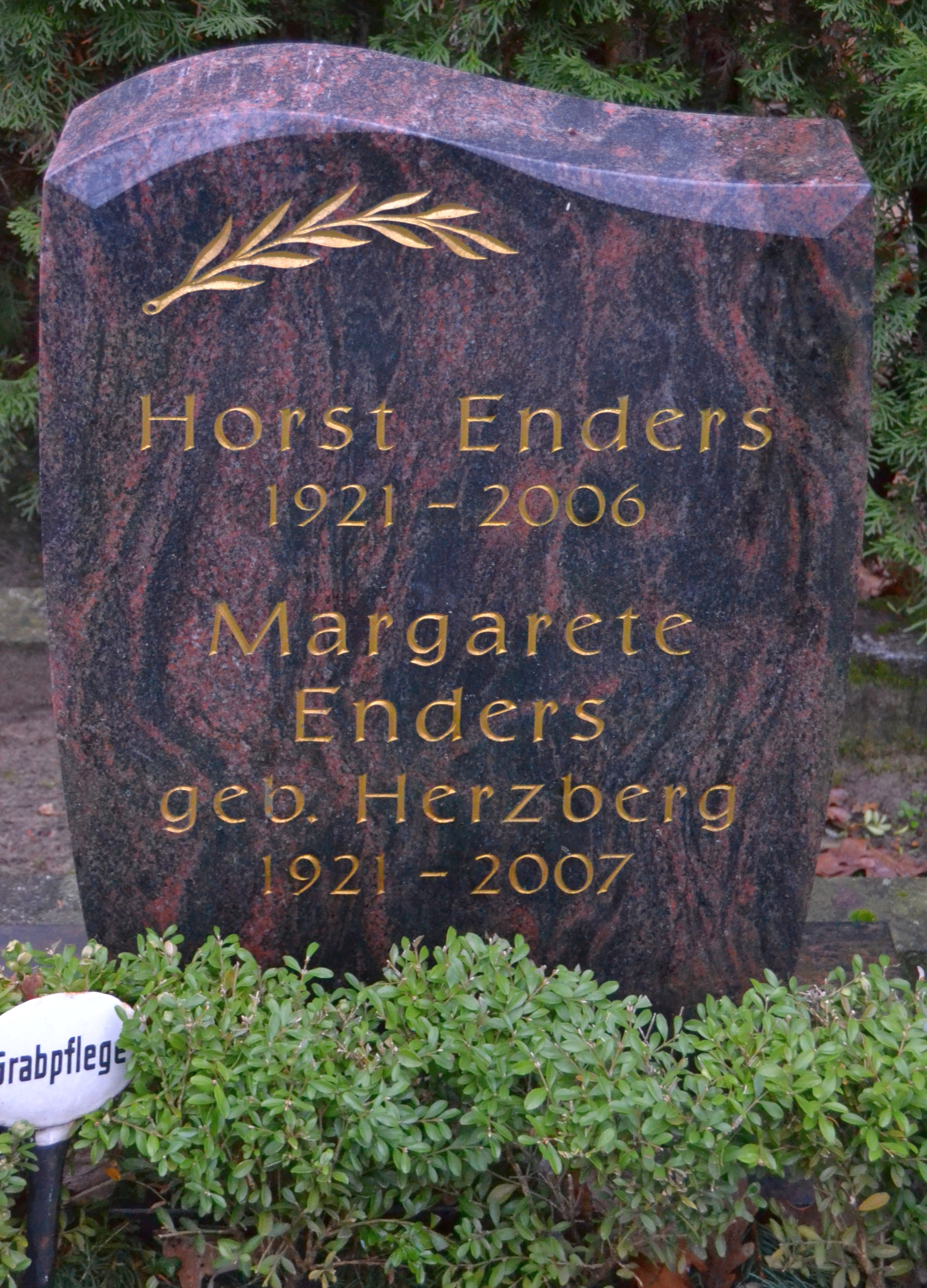
Grave of Horst and Margarete Enders at the Waldfriedhof Schöneiche.

In concert, Herzberg worked with conductors Herbert Kegel and Ekkehard Tietze, among others. She sang the contralto parts in Bach's Christmas Oratorio BWV 248, in the cantatas Gott der Herr ist Sonn und Schild, BWV 79 and Erschallet, ihr Lieder, erklinget, ihr Saiten! BWV 172, in Mozart's Requiem KV 626 and Beethoven's Mass in C major Op. 86.

Herzberg was married with the author and playwright Horst Enders. Her grandson is the Kapellmeister Fabian Enders. Enders, who kept her birth name Herzberg as a stage name during her active time, lived from 1963 until her death in 2007 at age 85 in Woltersdorf, Brandenburg. Her grave is located at the Waldfriedhof in Schöneiche.
