= Werner Enders =

German tenor

Werner Enders (11 March 1924 – 1 December 2005) was a German operatic tenor and member of the Komische Oper Berlin.

== Life and career ==
Born in Beiersdorf, Enders attended the music school of Radebeul and then studied violin in Zwickau and Berlin. In 1941/42 he helped as second violinist at the Semperoper Dresden. During the war he suffered a paralysis of his left hand, which made it impossible for him to continue playing the violin. From 1945 he therefore played drums and from 1947 he was a choir singer in Zwickau, since he had also received singing training. Two years later he went to the Landestheater Altenburg where he worked as a soloist for four years. Later he was at the Landestheater Halle (Saale) and belonged together with Philine Fischer, Margarete Herzberg, Günther Leib, Hellmuth Kaphahn, Kurt Hübenthal and others to the ensemble of the Handel Festival, Halle.

In 1955 Enders was engaged by the Komische Oper Berlin. There he was a member of the ensemble from 1957 and then denoted as Kammersänger, from 1993 he was an honorary member.

"Walter Felsenstein discovered the young tenor by chance in Halle and was so convinced of his creation of a women's role in Il Campiello that he brought him to the comic opera together with the director and stage designer," was tribute paid by the Komische Oper to him on his death.

Enders appeared in 61 productions by Walter Felsenstein, Joachim Herz, Götz Friedrich and Harry Kupfer on stage, including King Bobèche in Offenbach's Bluebeard (which he played for 29 years) and a double role in Janáček's The Cunning Little Vixen.

He was also one of the soloists who sang in the world premiere of the opera Das Land Bum-Bum composed by Georg Katzer with a libretto by Rainer Kirsch at the Komische Oper, a piece critical of the East German communist regime.

Enders died in Berlin at age 81.

== Awards ==
- 1956: First Handel Prize
- 1962: National Prize of the German Democratic Republic

== Theatre ==
- 1968: Hans Werner Henze: Der junge Lord (Lord Barrat) – direction: Joachim Herz (Komische Oper Berlin)
