= Philine Fischer =

German soprano

Philine Fischer, née Franke, married name Sannemüller (1 February 1919 – 22 January 2001) was a German opera and concert singer (soprano).

== Life and career ==
Born in Leipzig, Fischer made her debut in 1944 as "Micaela" in Bizet's Carmen at the Oldenburgisches Staatstheater. After the success of the Handel oratorio Messiah conducted by Hermann Abendroth in the St. Thomas Church, Leipzig in 1945, she advanced to the status of prima donna of the 50s. From 1945 to 1952 she was engaged at the Leipzig Opera and from 1952 to 1980 at the Halle Opera House, which awarded her honorary membership. She performed regularly at the Handel Festival, Halle and she sang 14 operas by Handel, among others Alcina, Deidamia and Mahamaya (as the character of Cleofide in the original libretto is named in a German translation) in Poro. She worked with the likes of Horst-Tanu Margraf, Rudolf Heinrich, Heinz Rückert, Rolf Apreck, Werner Enders, Kurt Hübenthal, Günther Leib and Hellmuth Kaphahn. In Hamburg she was appointed Kammersänger. Her last role in Halle was Herodias in Salome by Richard Strauss. She retired in 1981 and died in Leipzig at age 81.

She was a member of the board of directors of the Gewerkschaft Kunst (DDR) in Freier Deutscher Gewerkschaftsbund and was elected in October 1963 at the suggestion of the Cultural Association of the GDR as a successor candidate in the People's Chamber of the German Democratic Republic.

== Discography ==
- Mahamaya in Händel's Poro, Händel-Festspielorchester Halle, conductor: Horst-Tanu Margraf, recorded 7/1958, Berlin Classics 1998 (0093742BC)
