= Celestina Casapietra =

Italian operatic soprano (1938–2024)

- Casapietra in the 1960s
- Born: 23 August 1938; Genoa, Italy
- Died: 10 August 2024 (aged 85); Sori, Liguria, Italy
- Occupation: Operatic soprano
- Organizations: Berlin State Opera
- Title: Kammersängerin
- Spouse: Herbert Kegel (m. 1966; div. 1983)

Celestina Casapietra (23 August 1938 – 10 August 2024) was an Italian operatic soprano who was a member of the Berlin State Opera from 1965 to 1993 and appeared at leading European opera houses. She performed a wide repertoire from coloratura roles to Wagner's Elsa in Lohengrin and Giordano's Maddalena in Andrea Chénier, which she recorded on DVD alongside Franco Corelli.

== Life and career ==
Born in Genoa on 23 August 1938, Casapietra was exposed to opera early, took piano lessons as a child, and sang Verdi's Requiem in choir at age 15. She studied voice at the Genoa Conservatory and at the Milan Conservatory with Gina Cigna. Casapietra made her debut at the Teatro Nuovo in Milan in 1961 in Giordano's Mese mariano. She achieved prizes at competitions in Milan and Rome in 1963, and performed at Italian opera houses in Genoa, San Remo, Pisa, and Venice, and at the Opéra National de Lyon.

Casapietra was discovered by the conductor Otmar Suitner in 1964 when she performed in Wagner's Parsifal. He convinced her to join the Berlin State Opera in East Berlin. She performed there from 1965, first as the Kurtisane in Paul Dessau's Die Verurteilung des Lukullus, Fiordiligi in Mozart's Così fan tutte, Donna Anna in Mozart's Don Giovanni, and Woglinde in Wagner's Ring cycle. She appeared there as Leonore in Beethoven's Fidelio, Agathe in Weber's Der Freischütz, Elsa in Wagner's Lohengrin, Tatiana in Tchaikovsky's Eugene Onegin, and Maddalena in Giordano's Andrea Chénier. In 1971 she performed the title role of Massenet's Manon, alongside Peter Schreier as Des Grieux, staged by Horst Bonnet and conducted by Arthur Apelt. She also performed in Berlin as Cleopatra in Handel's Giulio Cesare, Alice Ford in Verdi's Falstaff, Liú in Puccini's Turandot, and Elisabeth in Wagner's Tannhäuser.

She was awarded the title of Kammersängerin by the Berlin State Opera. Her contract was terminated in 1993, leading to a long legal case which she won.

Casapietra appeared as a guest at La Fenice in Venice, the Vienna State Opera, the Bavarian State Opera in Munich, the Hamburg State Opera, and the Bolshoi Theatre in Moscow. At the Salzburg Festival, she appeared in Cavalieri's Rappresentatione di Anima, et di Corpo from 1969 to 1971. She portrayed Vitellia in Mozart's La clemenza di Tito at the 1984 Mozartwoche in Salzburg, the Marschallin in Der Rosenkavalier by Richard Strauss in Dublin in 1985, and Elisabeth in Tannhäuser at the 1986 festival of Las Palmas. She appeared as Yü-Pei in Zemlinsky's Der Kreidekreis in Amsterdam in 1986. In 1994, she performed as Puccini's Tosca in Genoa, and in the title role of Ariadne auf Naxos by R. Strauss in Lyon.

=== Personal life ===
Casapietra was married to conductor Herbert Kegel in 1966, with whom she had a son, Björn Casapietra, who was born in Genoa and has an Italian passport. Casapietra and Kegel were regarded as a glamour couple in East Germany in the 1960s, and divorced in 1983. She had residences in Berlin and Sori, Liguria.

Casapietra died in Sori on 10 August 2024, at the age of 85.

== Recordings ==
Casapietra recorded the role of Fiordiligi in the German version of Così fan tutte in 1971, with Suitner conducting the Staatskapelle Berlin, alongside Annelies Burmeister as Dorabella, Sylvia Geszty as Despina, Peter Schreier as Ferrando, Günther Leib as Guglielmo, and Theo Adam as Don Alfonso. In 1973 she appeared as Maddalena on a DVD of Giordano's Andrea Chénier for Hardy Classic, alongside Franco Corelli in the title role and Piero Cappuccilli. Reviewer Alan Blyth from Gramophone wrote that she successfully played her role of a spoiled girl who developed into a desperate lover, "singing with a nice combination of tenderness and intense feeling".

Her recordings of concert repertoire include Bach's Mass in B minor conducted by her husband in 1975 with the Rundfunkchor Leipzig and Rundfunk-Sinfonieorchester Leipzig, Renate Frank-Reinecke, Věra Soukupová, Eberhard Büchner, and Siegfried Vogel, as well as Orff's Carmina Burana for Philips in 1992, with her husband conducting the Rundfunkchor Leipzig, the Dresdner Kapellknaben and the Rundfunk-Sinfonieorchester Leipzig. A reviewer noted that she sang the challenging soprano solos in Carmina Burana "with distinction, delicacy, steadiness and poetic sensitivity". She performed the soprano solo in Mendelssohn's Lobgesang in a 1990 recording of his complete symphonies (Die fünf Sinfonien) for Eurodisc, with Kurt Masur conducting the Gewandhausorchester.

She also took part in the DEFA opera film Gala unter den Linden (GDR, 1977), and played the role of the singing teacher in Arnaud des Pallières' film Drancy Avenir (1997).
