= Sylvia Geszty =

Hungarian-German operatic soprano

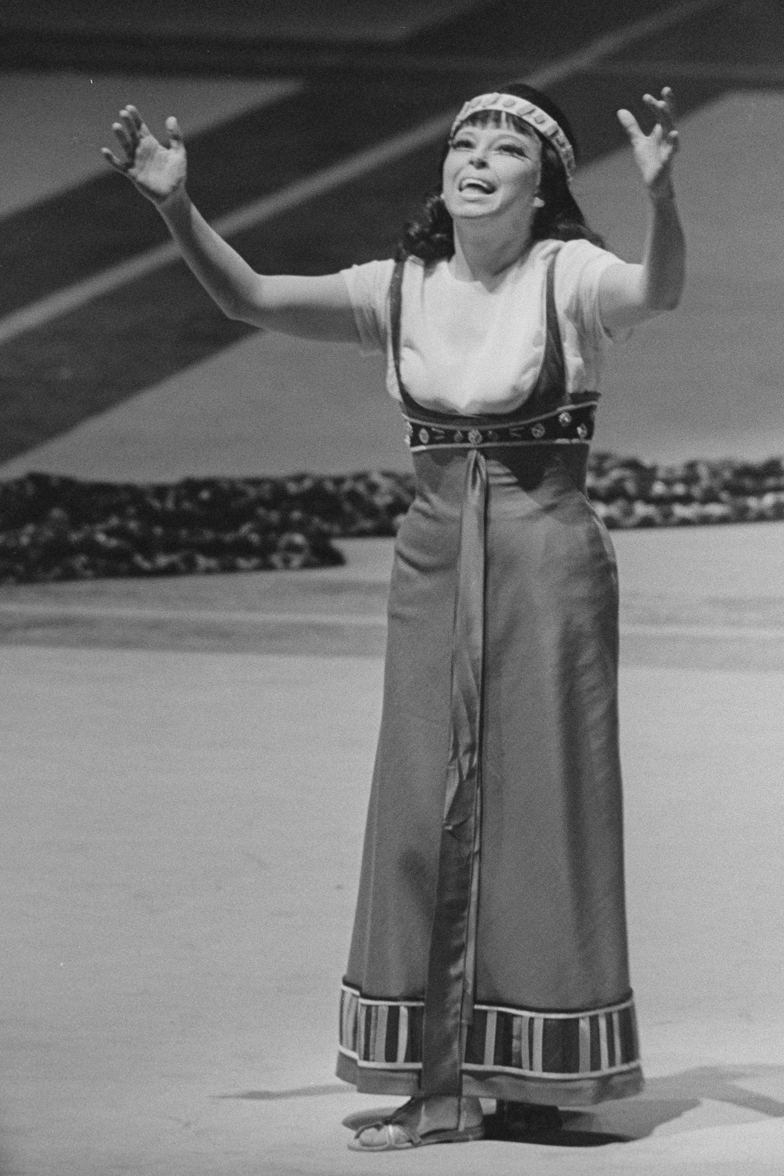
- Geszty as Cleopatra in Handel's Giulio Cesare in Egitto, Berlin, 1970
- Born: Sylvia Maria Ilona Wytkowsky; 28 February 1934; Budapest, Kingdom of Hungary
- Died: 13 December 2018 (aged 84); Stuttgart, Germany
- Education: Franz Liszt Academy of Music
- Occupations: Operatic coloratura soprano; Academic voice teacher
- Organizations: Staatsoper Berlin; Staatstheater Stuttgart; Musikhochschule Stuttgart
- Awards: Art Prize of the German Democratic Republic

Sylvia Geszty (born Sylvia Maria Ilona Wytkowsky; Hungarian: Geszty (Witkowsky) Ilona Mária Szilvia [ˈɡɛsti ˈsilvijɒ]; 28 February 1934 – 13 December 2018) was a Hungarian-German operatic coloratura soprano who appeared internationally, based first at the Staatsoper Berlin in East Berlin and from 1970 at the Staatstheater Stuttgart. She is remembered as Mozart's Queen of the Night and an ideal Zerbinetta in Ariadne auf Naxos, but also performed Baroque opera and in the world premiere of Kurt Schwaen's Leonce und Lena.

Geszty was for decades a professor of voice at the Musikhochschule Stuttgart and also taught a master class in Zurich. She made many recordings and appeared on radio and television and in concert and recitals.

== Life and career ==
Born in Budapest, she studied at the Franz Liszt Academy of Music in Budapest with Erzsébet Hoór Tempis. She won several singing competitions while still a student, including the Robert Schumann International Competition for Pianists and Singers in Berlin. In 1959, she made her debut at the Hungarian State Opera House and became a soloist of the Hungarian Philharmonic Society. Two years later, she became a member of the Staatsoper Berlin, making her debut there in the role of Amor in Gluck's Orfeo ed Euridice. Her roles included Susanna in Mozart's Le nozze di Figaro, the Queen of the Night in his Die Zauberflöte, Gilda in Verdi's Rigoletto and the Tsaritsa of Shemakha in Rimsky-Korsakov's Der goldene Hahn. On 15 October 1961, she appeared as Rosetta in the world premiere of Kurt Schwaen's Leonce und Lena. In 1965, she appeared as Die englische Königin (The Queen of England) in Rudolf Wagner-Régeny's Die Bürger von Calais, directed by Fritz Bennewitz and conducted by Heinz Fricke. In 1968, she first sang a role which was to become her signature role: Zerbinetta in Ariadne auf Naxos by Richard Strauss. Her interpretation of the challenging role was described by critic John Steane as the "most emotional, multi-faceted and human of all" ("die ausdruckswärmste, vielgestaltigste und menschlichste Darstellung von allen"). In 1969, she appeared as Rosina in Rossini's Il barbiere di Siviglia, staged by Ruth Berghaus.

In Berlin, she continued to take voice lessons with Dagmar Freiwald-Lange. From 1963, she was also a regular guest at the Komische Oper Berlin where she appeared as the four leading female characters in Offenbach's Hoffmanns Erzählungen, among others. In 1966, she performed as Rosmene in Handel's Imeneo at the Handel Festival in Halle, conducted by Horst-Tanu Margraf, with Günther Leib in the title role and Hans-Joachim Rotzsch as Tirinto, in a performance that was recorded. She was awarded the Art Prize of the German Democratic Republic in 1966 and the title Kammersängerin in 1968. She appeared as a guest in Europe and the Americas, as the Queen of the Night at the Royal Opera House in London in 1966, at the Salzburg Festival in the same role from 1967, and in 1969 as Sophie in Der Rosenkavalier by Richard Strauss at both the Teatro Colón in Buenos Aires and the Los Angeles Opera.

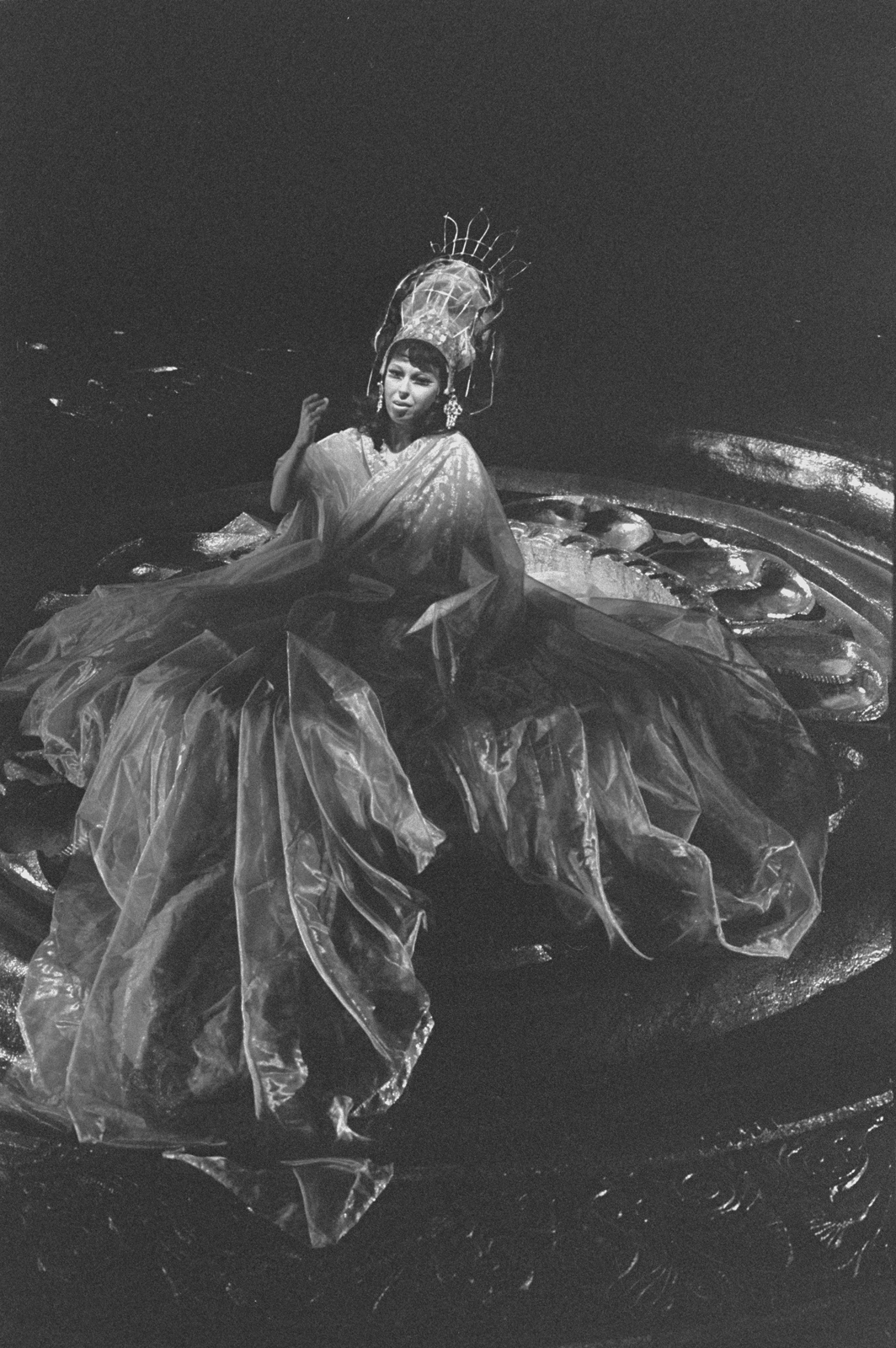
Geszty as Cleopatra in Handel's Giulio Cesare in Egitto, Berlin, 1970

In 1970, she moved to West Germany and became a permanent member of the Staatstheater Stuttgart ensemble, where she first appeared as Rosina. She appeared as Zerbinetta, as Mimi in Puccini's La Bohéme, staged by Götz Friedrich, and in the title role of Donizetti's Lucia di Lammermoor, among others.

She was a permanent guest at the Bavarian State Opera in Munich and at the Vienna State Opera, where she appeared as Queen of the Night in 1967, as Rosina, Zerbinetta, Gilda and Olympia in Les contes d'Hoffmann. In 1966, she performed as Rosmene in Handel's Imeneo at the Halle Handel Festival, conducted by Horst-Tanu Margraf, with Günther Leib in the title role and Hans-Joachim Rotzsch as Tirinto. She performed at major opera houses, including Hamburg, Paris, Brussels, Moscow, Amsterdam and opera houses in Italy. She appeared at the Glyndebourne Festival Opera in 1971 and 1972 as Zerbinetta and in 1972 also as Konstanze in Mozart's Die Entführung aus dem Serail. Geszty also performed as a lieder and oratorio singer and in operetta.

From 1975 to 1997, she was a professor of voice at the Musikhochschule Stuttgart. From 1985 to 1991 she also directed a master class at the Zurich Conservatory. Her students included Melanie Diener, Annette Luig, Marlis Petersen and Anke Sieloff.

In 1988, Geszty initiated an international coloratura singing competition. She made many recordings, television appearances (over 80 programmes for ARD and ZDF), films and radio programmes. On her 70th birthday, the singer published her autobiography, Königin der Koloraturen. Erinnerungen.

Geszty died in Stuttgart at age 84.

== Recordings ==
Among Geszty's recordings is a 1968 complete recording of Ariadne auf Naxos, with Rudolf Kempe conducting the Staatskapelle Dresden, Gundula Janowitz in the title role, Teresa Zylis-Gara as the Composer and James King as Bacchus. A reviewer described her as the ideal Zerbinetta, with a "bell-like agile voice and sure technique" and clear diction. This recording was chosen by Zachary Woolfe of The New York Times as one of the best Strauss recordings ever in 2014, who described her singing as "exuberantly accurate". In 1968, she was cast as Despina in a recording of Mozart's Così fan tutte, with Otmar Suitner leading the Staatskapelle Berlin, alongside Celestina Casapietra, Annelies Burmeister, Peter Schreier, Günther Leib and Theo Adam. A reviewer introduced her as "then a reigning Zerbinetta" and wrote that she was "a fleet‚ strong-voiced and amusing Despina".

== Autobiography ==
- Königin der Koloraturen. Erinnerungen, Berlin 2004, ISBN 978-3-936324-09-9.

== Literature ==
- Ludwig Finscher (publisher): Die Musik in Geschichte und Gegenwart. Personalteil 7. Fra–Gre. Kassel 1998, p. 846.
