= Amtrup =

Amtrup is a surname. Notable people with the surname include:

- Walter Amtrup (1904–1974), German actor, film dubber, opera singer, and acting teacher
