= Sieloff =

Sieloff is a surname. Notable people with the surname include:

- Anke Sieloff (born 1965), German opera, operetta, and musical soprano and mezzo-soprano
- Klaus-Dieter Sieloff (1942–2011), German footballer
- Patrick Sieloff (born 1994), American ice hockey player
- Ron Sieloff (born 1944), American politician
