= Walter Amtrup =

German opera singer

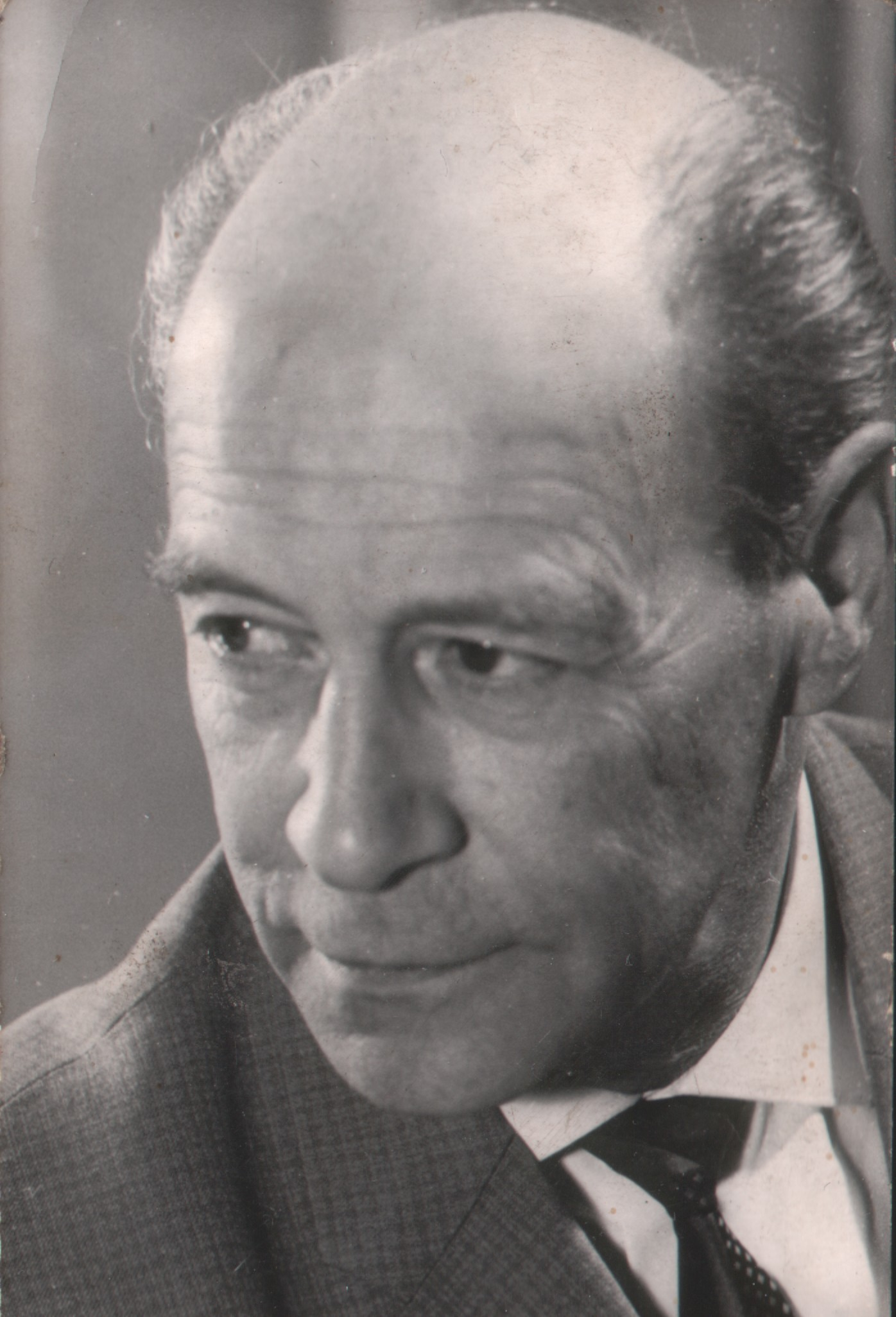
- Born: Walter Otto Hugo Karl Amtrup; 15 March 1904; Hamburg, German Empire
- Died: 7 August 1974 (aged 70); Erfurt, East Germany

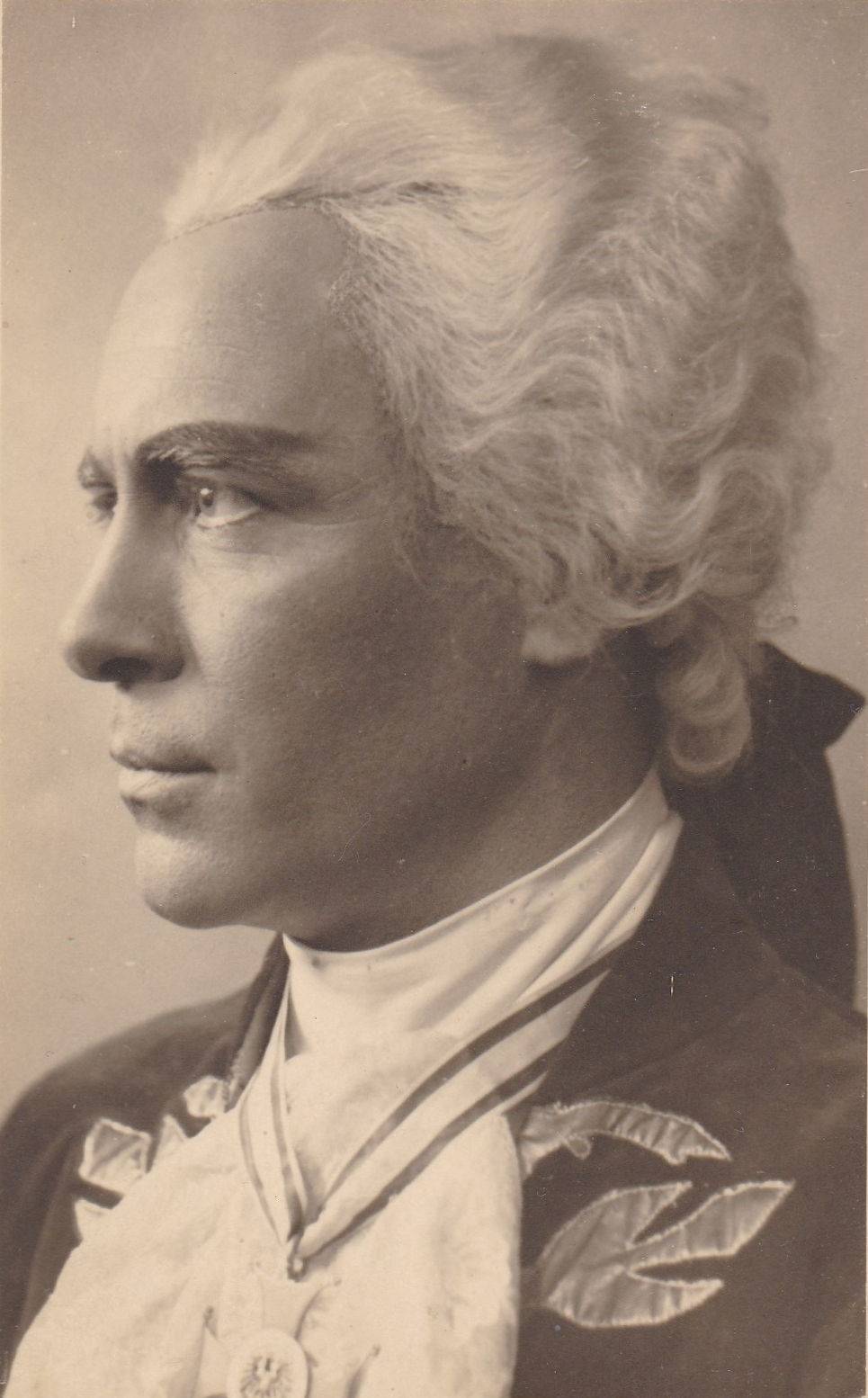
Walter Amtrup as Tellheim in Minna von Barnhelm (1930s)

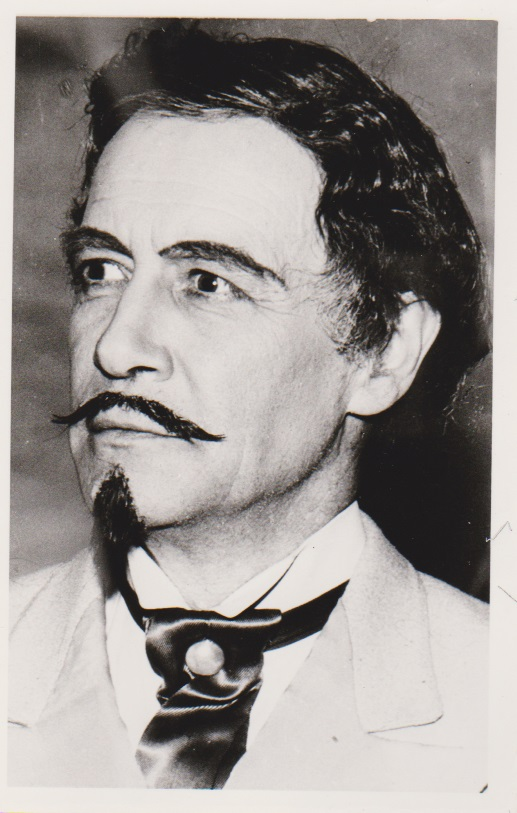
Walter Amtrup as banker de Bleusse in Die Niederlage, 1959

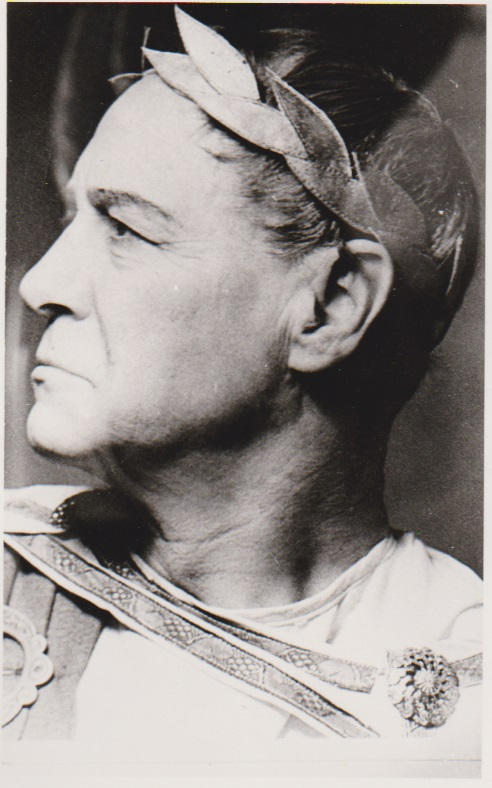
Walter Amtrup as Caesar in Julius Caesar, 1959

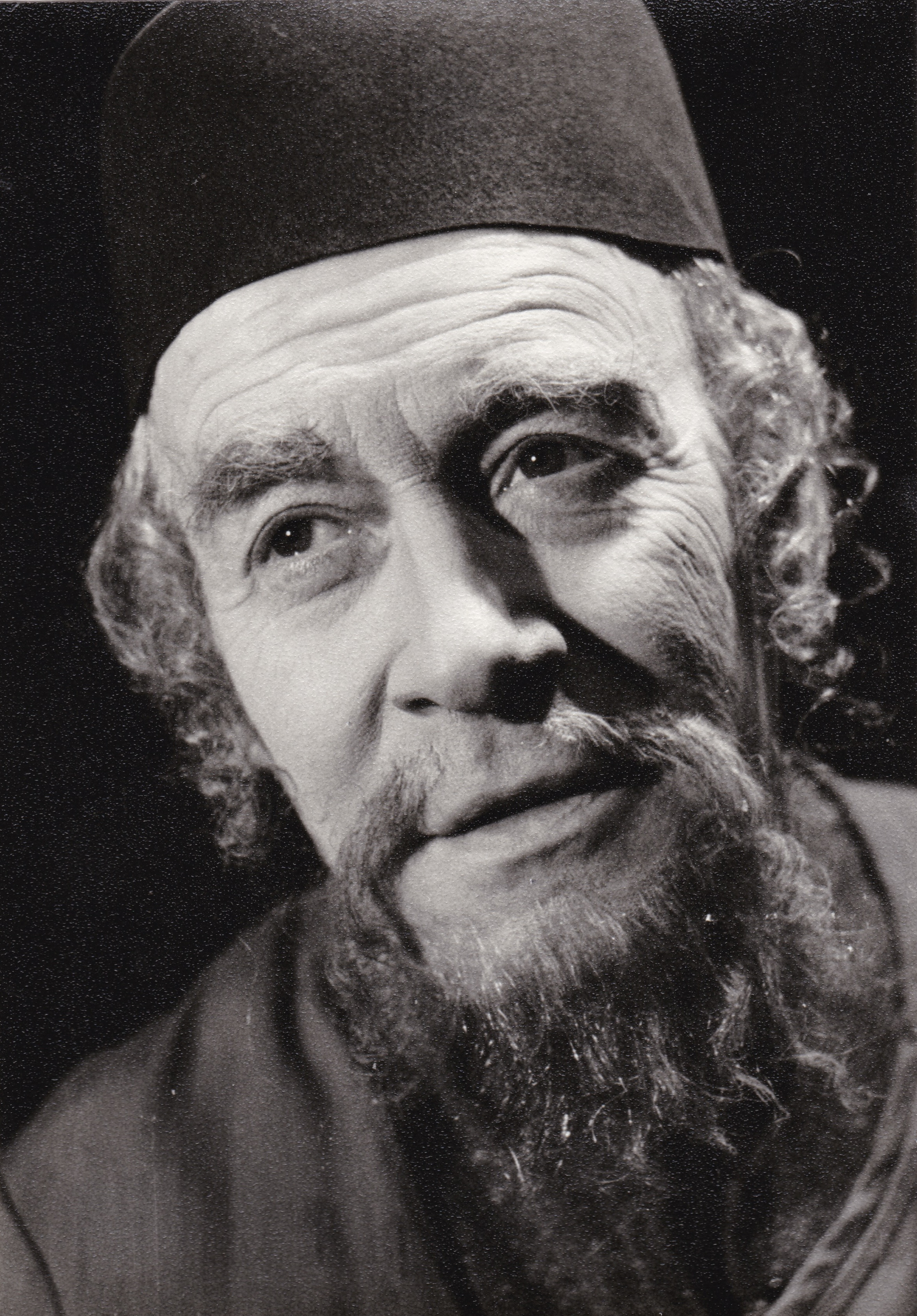
Walter Amtrup as Nathan in Nathan der Weise, 1965

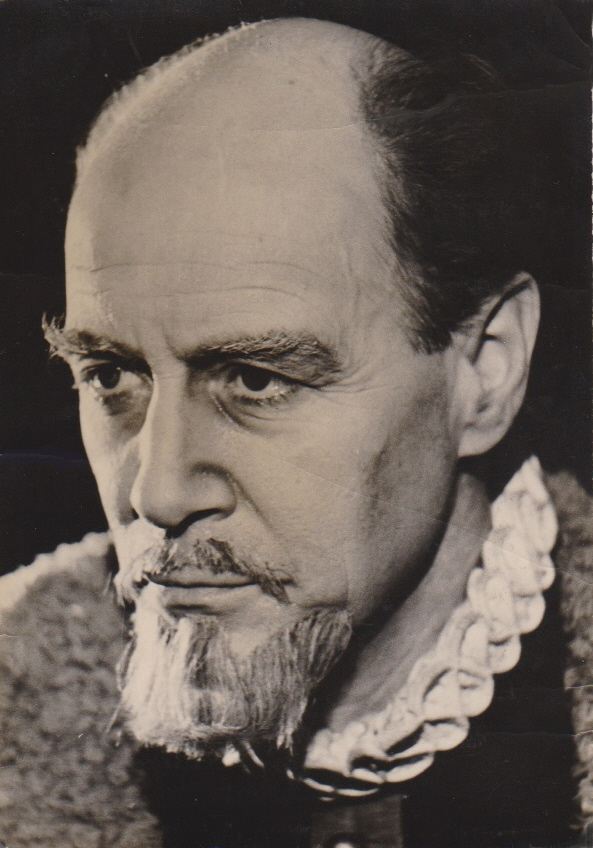
Walter Amtrup as Shrewsbury in Maria Stuart, 1956

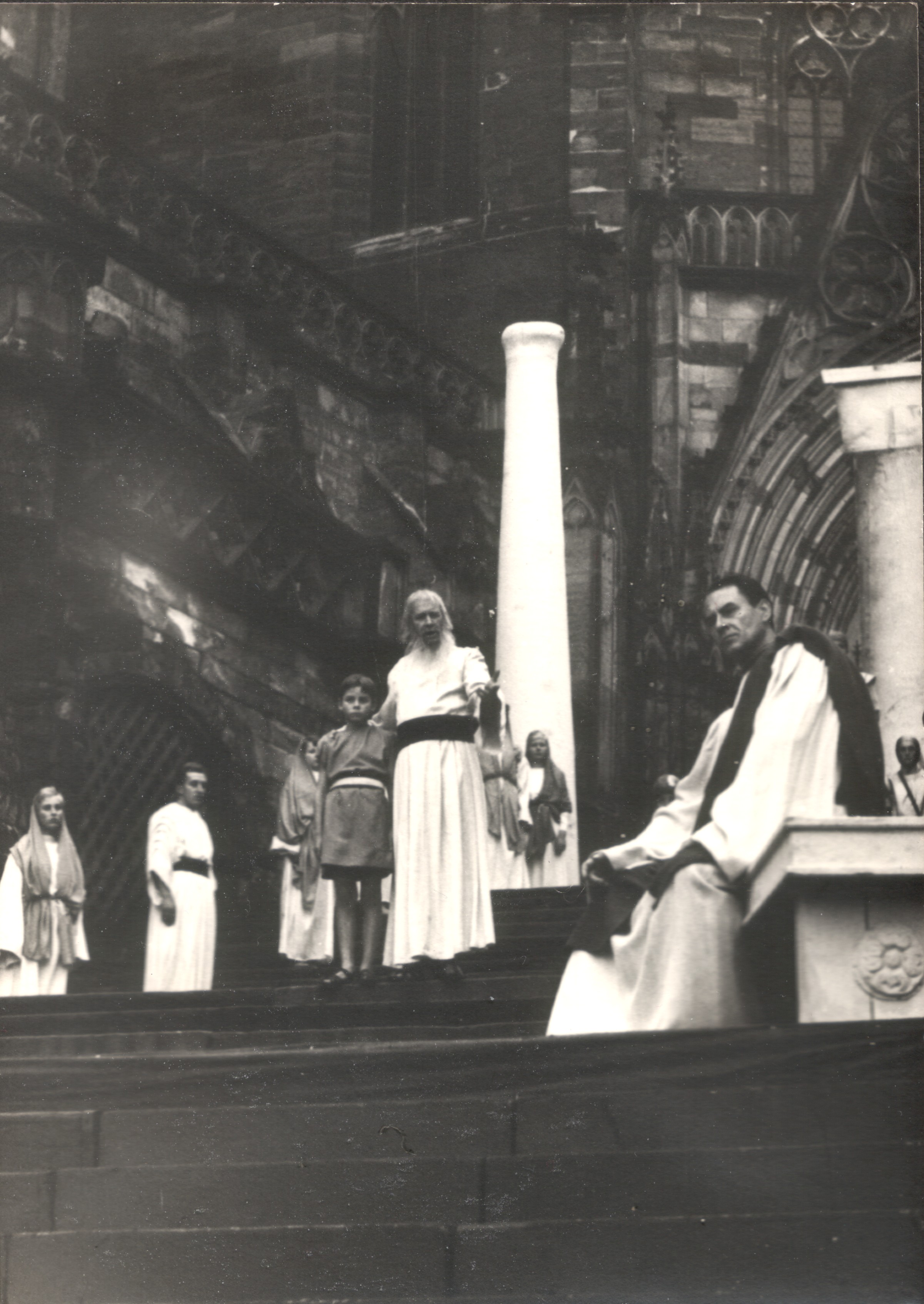
Walter Amtrup (center) with his son Niels-Torsten and Heinz Liefers (right) in Antigone at the Erfurter Domstufen (ca. 1960)

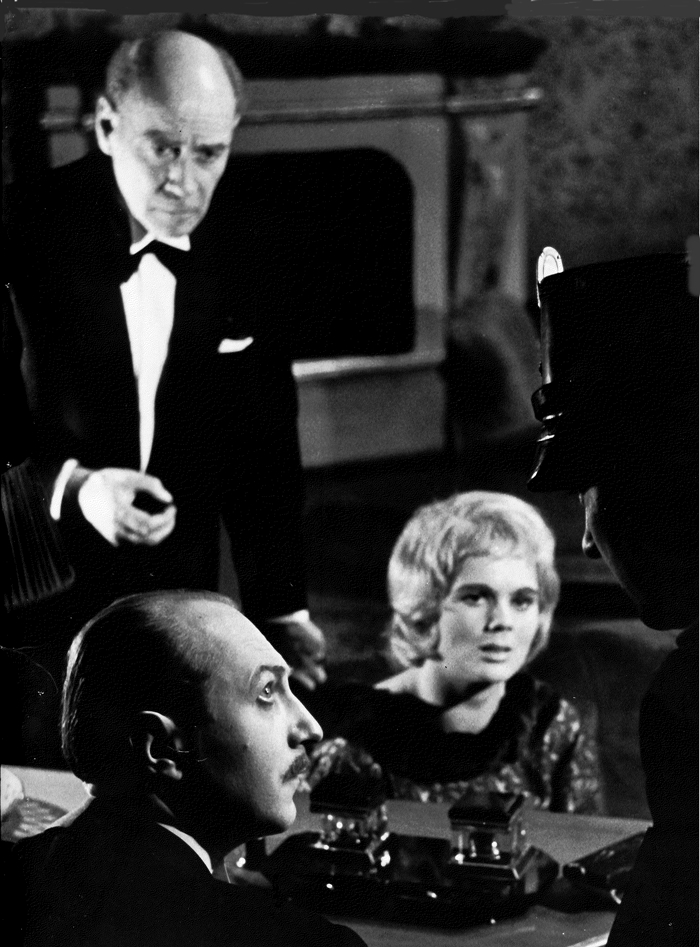
Walter Amtrup (standing), Klaus Mertens, and Renate-Catharina Schroff in Parkstraße 13, 1963

Walter Otto Hugo Karl Amtrup (15 March 1904 – 7 August 1974) was a German actor, film dubber, opera singer (bass), and acting teacher.

== Early life and education ==
Walter Amtrup was born in Altona, Hamburg as the son of a state court judge. He attended the gymnasium in Lüneburg and, following his Abitur graduation, enrolled at the Berlin University of the Arts. He was educated as an opera singer and a stage actor from 1925 until 1931.

== Opera and acting career ==
Amtrup made his professional opera debut in 1932 at the Landestheater Altenburg. This was followed by many appearances in Meißen, Neisse, Wilhelmshaven, Hanau, Bunzlau, at the Staatstheater Schwerin (state theater of Mecklenburg) and until the end of the Second World War at the municipal Städtische Bühnen in Chemnitz.

== German Democratic Republic ==
Ten years after the end of World War II, the Amtrup family moved to Central Germany in 1955, where Amtrup was employed as a character actor by the Städtische Bühnen Erfurt. In 1966 he was booked by the Meiningen Court Theatre, where his artistic career ended in 1969.

== Family ==
Walter Amtrup was married to former opera singer Johanna Amtrup, née Kieling. The couple had three children: Karin (born 1936), Turid (born 1943), and Niels-Torsten (born 1951). The German marine biologist and dolphin research scientist Karsten Brensing is Walter Amtrup’s grandson.

== Artistic career ==
=== Education and engagements ===
- 1925–1931: Education at the Berlin University of the Arts, specializing in drama/opera
- 1932–1933: Landestheater Altenburg
- 1933: Stadttheater Meißen
- 1934: Stadttheater Neiße
- 1935: Neues Schauspielhaus der Jadestädte, Wilhelmshaven
- 1936: Stadttheater Hanau
- 1937–1941: Staatstheater Schwerin
- 1941–1945: Städtische Bühnen Chemnitz
- 1947–1951: Städtische Bühnen Flensburg
- 1955–1966: Städtische Bühnen Erfurt
- 1966–1969: Meininger Theater

=== Roles ===
==== Theater ====
Theater Altenburg

- 1931: UB 16 (Wireless Operator)
- 1931: Die Wundertannen am Wurzel (Wassermann)
- 1932: Manon Lescaut (innkeeper)

Theater Meißen

- 1933: Jagd ihn – ein Mensch (Bless-Karle)

Theater Neiße

- 1933: Schlageter (Schlageter)
- 1933: Doktor und Apotheker (pharmacist Stößel)
- 1933: UB 16 (Helmsman)
- 1933: Der Mann mit den grauen Schläfen (Baron Jaro Milanovici)
- 1934: Die große Chance
- 1934: Don Cesar (Specialised Minister of Intrigue)

Theater Wilhelmshaven

- 1934: Alle gegen Einen – Einer gegen Alle (Wasa)
- 1934: Christa, ich erwarte Dich (Hans Tettenborn)
- 1934: Minna von Barnhelm (Major von Tellheim)
- 1934: Des Meeres und der Liebe Wellen (Naukleros)
- 1935: Das Frühstück zu Rudolstadt (Duke of Alba)
- 1935: Anna Kronthaler (Gaenswürger)
- 1935: Das Wunderwasser (Adam Schrott)
- 1935: Don Carlos (Marquis Posa)

Theater Hanau

- 1935: Peer Gynt (Peer Gynt)
- 1935: Am Himmel Europas
- 1936: Die Insel (Commercial Attaché Raaz)

Theater Bunzlau

- 1936: Vertrag am Karakat (Risa Khan)

Schweriner Theater

- ?: Der Thron zwischen Erdteilen (Borkdorf/Sollikow; dual role)
- 1937: Prinz Friedrich von Homburg (Count of Hohenzollern)
- 1938: De adlige Rosenblome (Earl Hinrich von der Bröderborg)
- 1939: Der andere Feldherr

Theater Chemnitz

- 1941: Liebeskomödie
- 1941: Maria Stuart (Melvil)
- 1942: Der Leutnant Vary (auditeur)
- 1942: Ein Windstoß (Chief Appellate Judge)
- 1942: Die große Kurve (Dr. Timm)
- 1942: Die Braut von Messina (Drege)
- 1942: Donna Diana (Diana’s father Don Diego)
- 1943: Not Gottes (Monk Severin)
- 1943: Ihr Talisman (Tsing)
- 1943: Die Medaille (farmer Merkl)
- 1944: Die Piccolomini (Count of Terzky)
- 1944: Onkel Bonaparte (Lawyer Montklupo)

Theater Flensburg

- 1947: Ein Inspektor kommt (Inspector Goole)
- 1947: Pinkepank (mayor)
- 1948: Des Teufels General (Chief Inspector Oderbruch)
- 1948: Nathan der Weise (Nathan)
- 1948: Egmont (grocer Soest)
- 1948: Der Freischütz (Samiel, the black hunter)
- 1948: Die erste Frau Selby (Philip Logan)
- 1948: Wie es euch gefällt (Charles, a wrestler)
- 1948: Romeo und Julia (Lord Capulet)
- 1948: Der fröhliche Weinberg (Mr. Rindsfuß)
- 1948: Draußen vor der Tür (Colonel)
- 1948: Der Geizige (magistrate)
- 1948: Der gestiefelte Kater (wizard Hudriwudri)
- 1948: Der Kreidekreis (drudge)
- 1948: Dreigroschenoper (Police Chief Brown)
- 1948: Nebel (Lieutenant Schubert, detective)
- 1948: Lady Windermeres Fächer (butler Parker)
- 1948: Jeppe vom Berge (Jakob Schuster)
- 1948: Hamlet (Claudius – King of Denmark, Hamlet’s uncle)
- 1948: Aschenbrödel (Lord Stewart Grasemück)
- 1948: Wenn der Schnee schmilzt (Wlad)
- 1949: Der Lügner und die Nonne (butler Petrops)
- 1949: Weiße Fracht (missionary)
- 1949: Der Patriot (Aide-de-camp Murawiew)
- 1949: Die kluge Verliebte (Cavalry Captain Bernardo)
- 1949: Don Karlos (Duke of Medina Sidonia, Admiral)
- 1949: Ein Spiel von Tod und Liebe (Jérom Courvoisier)
- 1950: Die Wildente (Mr. Flor)
- 1950: Der Tausch (Thomas Pollok Nagevire, broker)
- 1950: Robert Guiskard (old man)
- 1950: Einmann (chairman) [premiere]
- 1950: Hund im Hirn (professor)
- 1950: Jedermann (a poor neighbour)
- 1951: Wilhelm Tell (Werner Freiherr von Attinghausen)
- 1951: Und Pippa tanzt (stained-glass artist Scheidler)
- 1951: Das tapfere Schneiderlein (warlock)
- 1951: Ein Sommernachtstraum (Egeus)
- ?: Saison in Salzburg (Christian Dahlmann)
- ?: Menschen in Weiß (Dr. Clayton)
- ?: Im weißen Rößl (Franz Joseph, emperor of Austria-Hungary)
- ?: Ihr 106. Geburtstag (Monsignore Mouret, bishop)
- ?: Ballade am Strom (Büchler, boatman)
- ?: Pygmalion (Colonel Pickering)
- ?: Die Nachtigall (Grand Vizier)
- ?: Barbara Blomberg (Duke of Alba)
- ?: Die schmutzigen Hände (Karsky)
- ?: Frau im Hermelin (Stojahn)

Städtische Bühnen Erfurt

- 1955: Wallenstein (Wallenstein)
- 1956: Hamlet (ghost of Hamlet’s father)
- 1956: Die Lützower
- 1956: Aufruhr in Buchara (Sultan)
- 1956: Maria Stuart (Earl of Shrewsbury)
- 1957: Der Widerspenstigen Zähmung (Vincentio)
- 1957: König Lear (Earl of Gloster)
- 1957: Der kaukasische Kreidekreis (gouverneur)
- ?: Ende gut, alles gut (Lafeu, an old nobleman)
- 1958: Das Tagebuch der Anne Frank (Otto Frank)
- 1958: Schweyk im Zweiten Weltkrieg (Hitler)
- 1958: Götz von Berlichingen (Emperor Maximilian)
- 1958: Die Brücke
- 1958: Das Märchen (Mr. Charly)
- 1958: Kaution (Dr. Fuller)
- 1958: Die Schatzinsel (father)
- 1958: Auf jeden Fall verdächtig (englishman)
- 1959: Kredit bei Nibelungen (General Fabiani)
- 1959: Was ihr wollt (Orsino)
- 1959: Die Niederlage (banker de Bleusse)
- 1959: 15 Schnüre Geld
- 1959: Julius Caesar (Caesar)
- 1959: Der Revisor (superintendent of schools Chlopow)
- 1959: Wilhelm Tell (Attinghaus)
- 1959: Winterschlacht (Lieutenant-Colonel v. Quabbe)
- 1960: Antigone (Theresias) [at the Erfurter Domstufen]
- 1960: Die Weber (the old Hilse)
- 1961: Das Leben des Galilei (Sagredo)
- 1961: Richard III. (Lord Hastings)
- 1961: Irkutsker Geschichten
- 1961: Die Jungfrau von Orleans (La Hire, Royal Officer) [at the Erfurter Domstufen]
- 1961: Die Stärkeren (Engineer)
- 1961: Optimistische Tragödie (1. presbyter)
- 1961: Eine kleine Traumfabrik
- 1961: Und das am Heiligabend (the other father)
- 1962: Vor Sonnenuntergang (Privy Counsellor Matthias Clausen)
- 1962: Urfaust [auf den Domstufen]
- 1962: Ein idealer Gatte (Earl of Caversham)
- 1962: Die Holländerbraut
- 1963: Der Heiratsschwindler (Andersch)
- 1963: Egmont (Duke of Alba) [at the Erfurter Domstufen]
- 1963: Parkstraße 13 (Dr. Elken)
- 1963: Das 11. Gebot (confectioner)
- 1963: Macbeth (Duncan)
- 1964: Krieg und Frieden (doctor)
- 1964: Romeo und Julia (Brother Lorenzo) [at the Erfurter Domstufen]
- 1964: Das Untier von Samarkant (indian merchant Shalakandavra)
- 1964: Prof. Hudebrauch (Guttler)
- 1964: Peter und der Wolf (narrator)
- 1964: Die Räuber (Count of Moor)
- 1965: Mutter Courage und ihre Kinder (soldier)
- 1965: Unterwegs (father)
- 1965: Komödie der Irrungen (Aegon)
- 1965: Die Geier der Helen Turner (Captain Brixon)
- 1965: Nathan der Weise (Nathan)
- 1966: Der Besuch der alten Dame (butler)

Meininger Theater (excerpts)

- Das Feuerwerk (Albert Oberholzer)
- Der Besuch der alten Dame (butler)
- Herodes und Mariamne (Sameas, a pharisee)
- Unterwegs (train conductor)
- Die Räuber (Daniel, housekeeper)
- Maria Stuart (Melvil, house steward)
- Caesar und Cleopatra (3. senior official / majordomo)
- Amphitryon (Argatiphontidas)

==== Film and television ====
Actor

- 1957: Polonia-Express
- 1959: Der Spekulant (TV)
- 1960: Die Hunde bellen nicht mehr (TV)

Film dubber

- 1958: Kassendiebe – as Boček (Czechoslovak film)
- 1958: Testpiloten – as Anufrijew (Mosfilm)
- 1959: Invention for Destruction – as Graf Artigas (Czechoslovak film)
- 1959: Die letzte Chance (Italian Film)
- 1960: Tierfänger – as animal catcher – not mentioned by name (Soviet film)
- 1961: Das schwarze Gesicht – not mentioned by name (Hungarian film)
