= Anke Sieloff =

German soprano

- Born: 16 December 1965 (age 60); Stuttgart, West Germany
- Education: Musikhochschule Stuttgart
- Occupations: Operatic soprano; Operatic mezzo-soprano; Academic teacher
- Organizations: Musiktheater im Revier; Musikhochschule Lübeck; Folkwang University of the Arts
- Awards: Bundeswettbewerb Gesang

Anke Sieloff (born 16 December 1965) is a German opera, operetta, and musical soprano and mezzo-soprano. A member of the Musiktheater im Revier, she has focused on musical roles such as Maria in West Side Story, the title characters in both Kiss Me, Kate and Evita, and a witch in the first German production of The Witches of Eastwick. She taught both classical singing and pop singing at music universities.

== Life ==
Sieloff was born in Stuttgart. From the age of five, the daughter of the football player Klaus-Dieter Sieloff received classical ballet lessons. From 1985 to 1990 she studied singing as her main subject with Sylvia Geszty at the Musikhochschule Stuttgart, finishing with a diploma, and continued her studies at the Stuttgart Opera School.

Since the 1993/94 season, Sieloff has been a permanent member of the Musiktheater im Revier ensemble. There she appeared in many operas and operettas, among others as Dorabella in Mozart's Così fan tutte, Rosina in Rossini's Il barbiere di Siviglia, Cherubino in Mozart's Le nozze di Figaro, Sextus in Mozart's La clemenza di Tito, Fenena in Verdi's Nabucco, and Jenny in Weill's Aufstieg und Fall der Stadt Mahagonny. She appeared also as Queen Eleonora in Donizetti's Rosmonda d'Inghilterra. In musicals, she appeared in Bernstein's Mass, was Maria in Bernstein's West Side Story, the title characters in both Porter's Kiss Me, Kate and Andrew Lloyd Webber's Evita, Reno in Porter's Anything Goes, Julie in Kern's Show Boat, and the Queen in Cy Coleman's The Life. She appeared as Polly Baker in Crazy for You and Ninotschka in Porter's Silk Stockings. In 2012, she was one of the three witches in the first German production of Die Hexen von Eastwick, a 2000 musical by Dana P. Rowe and John Dempsey based on Updike's novel The Witches of Eastwick. A review noted the witches' stage presence. Sieloff has made guest appearances on major German-language music stages.

Sieloff is also an interpreter of lieder. She taught popular singing at the Musikhochschule Lübeck and classical singing at the Folkwang University of the Arts from 2006 to 2009.

== Awards ==
At the age of 20, Sieloff won the first young talent award (Nachwuchspreis) at the Bundeswettbewerb Gesang in Berlin in the "Musical theatre" category. In 1990, she received the first Nachwuchspreis at the International Coloratura Singing Competition in Stuttgart, and in 1992 first prize at the Erika Köth Competition in Neustadt an der Weinstraße. In 1996, she was awarded the audience prize of the Theatergemeinde Gelsenkirchen for the role of Maria in West Side Story, in 1998 the Förderpreis des Landes Nordrhein-Westfalen für junge Künstlerinnen und Künstler, and in 2000 the Gelsenkirchener Theaterpreis.
