= Herbert Kegel =

German conductor (1920–1990)

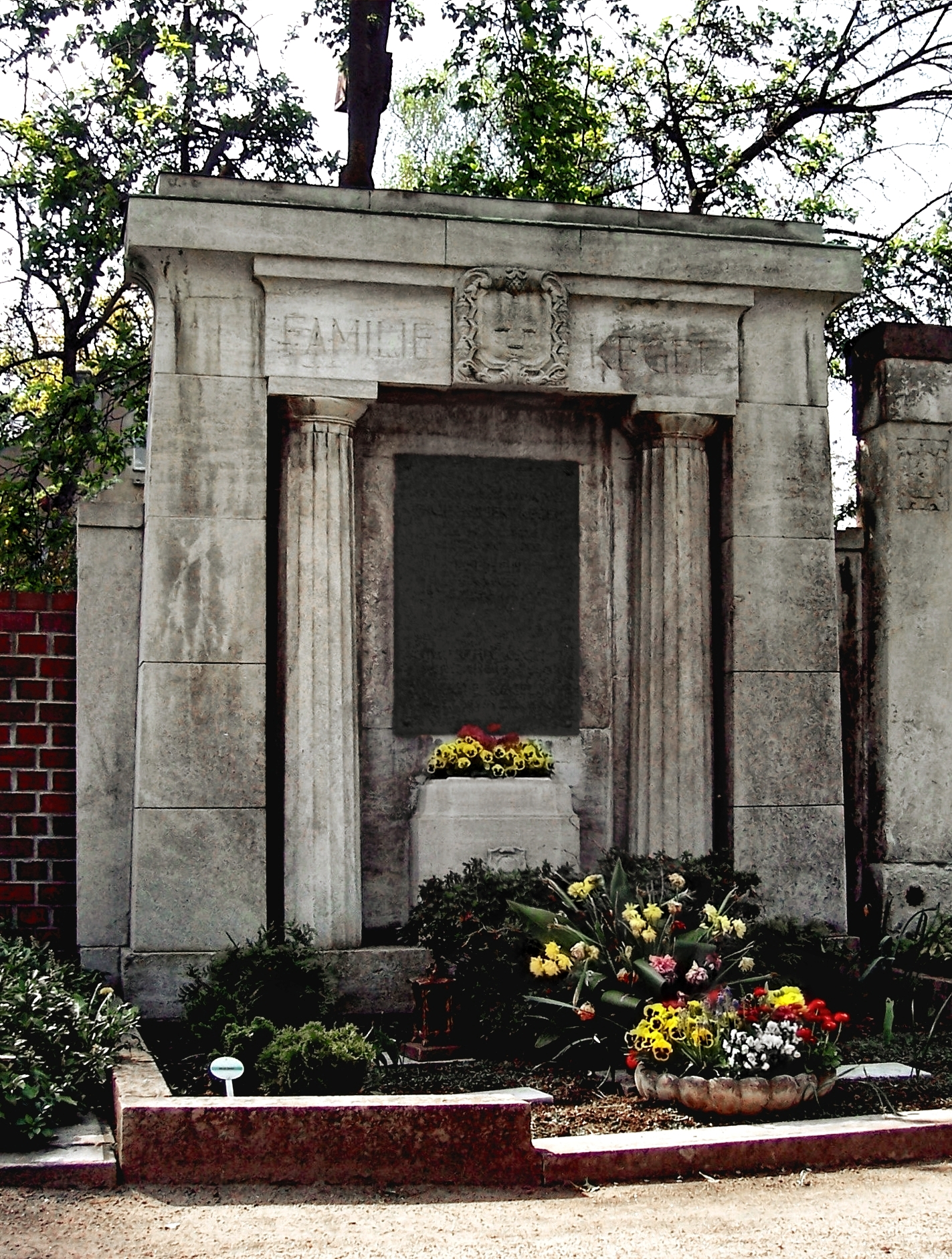
Grave of the Kegel family on the Stephanusfriedhof in Dresden

Herbert Kegel (29 July 1920 – 20 November 1990) was a German conductor.

Kegel was born in Dresden. He studied conducting with Karl Böhm and composition with Boris Blacher at the Dresden Conservatory from 1935 to 1940.

Herbert Kegel was drafted for military service in 1939. At the subsequent enlistment interview, he declined a position with the military music service. A year later, he was drafted into military service in Bautzen. In 1943, he received military training as a radio operator. Until 1945, he served in the 56th Infantry Division (Wehrmacht), which was deployed in the Eastern Front, among other things. During the war, he composed several songs. However, he had to end his career as a pianist due to a gunshot wound to his left hand.

For this reason, after the war, he took conducting lessons from Kurt Striegler, who recommended him to Pirna while he was still training as a conductor. In 1945, Kegel became a conductor at the Pirna Operetta Theater, where he worked with, among others, the singer Gretel Ferschinger. From August 1, 1946, he was choirmaster and second conductor at the Volkstheater Rostock. In Rostock, he met the influential composition teacher Rudolf Wagner-Régeny, who was then rector of the Rostock University of Music and Theatre. Kegel performed some of Wagner-Régeny's works at the Rostock City Theater.

In 1948 he began a three-decade-long association with the Leipzig Radio Orchestra and Choir, of which he became the principal conductor in 1960. Meanwhile, in 1977 Kegel took the position of principal conductor of Dresden Philharmonic Orchestra, which he kept until 1985.

In later years, he also conducted his works in Dresden and Berlin. His relationships with early GDR composers led the musicologist Klaus Angermann to conclude that Kegel had come to terms with Socialist Realism.

== Personal life ==
Kegel was married to the Italian soprano Celestina Casapietra from 1966 to 1983. Their son Björn Casapietra is active as a singer, media presenter and actor.

In 1990, he died by suicide in Dresden.
