= Horst-Tanu Margraf =

German conductor

- Born: 1903
- Died: 1978 (aged 74–75)
- Occupation: Conductor
- Organization: Handel Festival, Halle

Horst-Tanu Margraf (26 October 1903 − 1978) was a German conductor, Generalmusikdirektor of Halle (Saale) from 1950 to 1969.

After the National Socialists seized power, he joined the Nazi Party on May 1, 1933 (membership number 2,415,680). During the Second World War he also performed as a guest in German-occupied territories, for example with the pro-German Philharmonisch Orkest van Antwerpen (1943). Then, he worked briefly at the Städtische Bühnen Lemberg (Lvov, occupied Poland), where he was appointed Music and Opera Director in the spring of 1943. Already in the summer of the same year, however, the Lvov Theater was forced to relocate to Kraków due to the approaching Red Army. Margraf performed there in 1944 with the propaganda orchestra Philharmonic of the General Government.

After the war, in Halle, he was one of the founders of the Handel Festival. He conducted the Staatskapelle Halle in several operas of George Frideric Handel, some in their first modern production, such as Rinaldo in 1954. He conducted for the festival Radamisto (1955), Poro (1956), Admetos (1958), Giulio Cesare (1959) and Imeneo (1960).

He conducted the Händel-Festspielorchester Halle [Handel Festival Orchestra of Halle] in recording Handel's 12 Сoncerti grossi op.6, made in 1966 and 1967.

In 1966 he conducted a recording of a shortened version of Imeneo with Günther Leib in the title role, Hans-Joachim Rotzsch as Tirinto, and Sylvia Geszty as Rosmene.
