= Kurt Hübenthal =

German opera singer (1918–2007)

Kurt Hübenthal (30 November 1918 – 13 March 2007) was a German operatic bass baritone, director and music teacher. He was professor for singing at the Hochschule für Musik Franz Liszt, Weimar.

== Life ==
Hübenthal was born in 1918 as one of two sons in Halle (Saale). He and his brother were members (soprano) of the Stadtsingechor zu Halle and, with the financial support of the choir, attended the school Latina. After their parents separated, the brothers moved to the orphanage of the Francke Foundations. They left school without a degree. Kurt Hübenthal completed a locksmith apprenticeship at the Reichsbahnausbesserungswerk in Halle.

During the Second World War, the brothers were drafted into the Wehrmacht (his brother was killed). During his deployment in the North African campaign at the turn of the year 1941/42, both were victims of eardrums burst. In 1942, he became a British prisoner of war and was taken on the RMS Queen Mary to a prison camp in the Canadian Rockies. A camp choir and orchestra was formed in captivity. He also took part in an opera performance of Lortzing's Zar und Zimmermann. There he also met Kammersänger Karl Marstatt and Kapellmeister Hans Oncken, who trained him in voice teaching and solo singing as well as choral conducting and theory. After the war he was moved to England, where he gave camp concerts and taught British officers.

In spring 1947 he was able to return to his home town, where he studied under Kurt Wichmann. In addition, he was trained by Fritz Polster in Leipzig. His first performances as a concert and oratorio singer followed. At the beginning of 1948, he received a teaching position at the Staatliche Hochschule für Theater und Musik Halle. In 1950, he became a lecturer for voice projection and head of a specialist group at the Institute for Music Education (later the Institute for Musicology) of the Martin-Luther-Universität Halle-Wittenberg. Hübenthal also taught at times at the Evangelische Hochschule für Kirchenmusik Halle, at the Institute for Music Education of the Friedrich-Schiller-Universität Jena and at the Hochschule für Musik Franz Liszt, Weimar. While teaching at the Kirchenmusikschule, he devoted himself intensively to the music of Johann Sebastian Bach, including his role as vox Christi in the St Matthew Passion. Hübenthal also sang in Handel oratorios like Alexander's Feast, Judas Maccabaeus, Messiah, Salomon and Samson and modern choral works were part of his repertoire. Under the conducting of Helmut Koch, he gave a guest performance in 1959 with Handel's Belshazzar in England. He also appeared in many ways as a song interpreter. On the occasion of the Schubert tribute in 1954, he interpreted his Winterreise. He also performed Lieder of Robert Schumann and ballads of Carl Loewe as well as modern pieces by Hanns Eisler and Paul Dessau. In 1956, he participated as soloist in the world premiere of Fritz Reuter's cantata Deutsche Libertät. A memorial service for Johannes R. Becher led him to Moscow in 1958.

After a guest performance in 1955 as Farasmane in the Handel opera Radamisto, he was engaged on 1 August 1956 as Italian and character baritone at the Halle Opera House and was one of its most important ensemble heads until 1966. In several Handel operas he sang the title role (Amadigi di Gaula, Giulio Cesare, Orlando, Ottone, Siroe and Tamerlano). He also sang Le nozze di Figaro (Count), Otello (Jago), Die Meistersinger von Nürnberg (Hans Sachs), Don Carlos (Posa), Zar und Zimmermann (Zar), La forza del destino (Carlos), Enoch Arden (title role) and The Rake's Progress (Nick Shadow).

The success of his Lehrstück production of Die Horatier und die Kuriatier by Bertolt Brecht and Kurt Schwaen at the Institute for Musicology, led him to take on more and more directing engagements. During the 1960 Handel Festival, Halle, he was still assistant to Heinz Rückert at the German premiere of Imeneo. Later, he was responsible as an independent director for the productions of Handel's Amadigi di Gaula, Mozart's Die Entführung aus dem Serail, Tchaikovsky's Eugene Onegin and Strauss'. Die schweigsame Frau. He staged a total of 37 operas.

In 1970, Hübenthal was appointed professor of singing at the Weimar Academy of Music, where he was promoted to prorector. In 1977, he was chairman of the jury for singing at the Robert Schumann International Competition for Pianists and Singers.

Hübenthal last lived with his daughter in Zwickau, where he died in 2007 at the age of 88.

== Awards ==
- 1959: Kammersänger
- 1959: Nationalpreis der DDR, 2nd Class for Art and Literature (as part of the Handel Festival, Halle, collektive)
- 1963: Handel Prize Halle
