= Landestheater Altenburg =

German theatre

Coordinates: 50.98717°N 12.43785°E

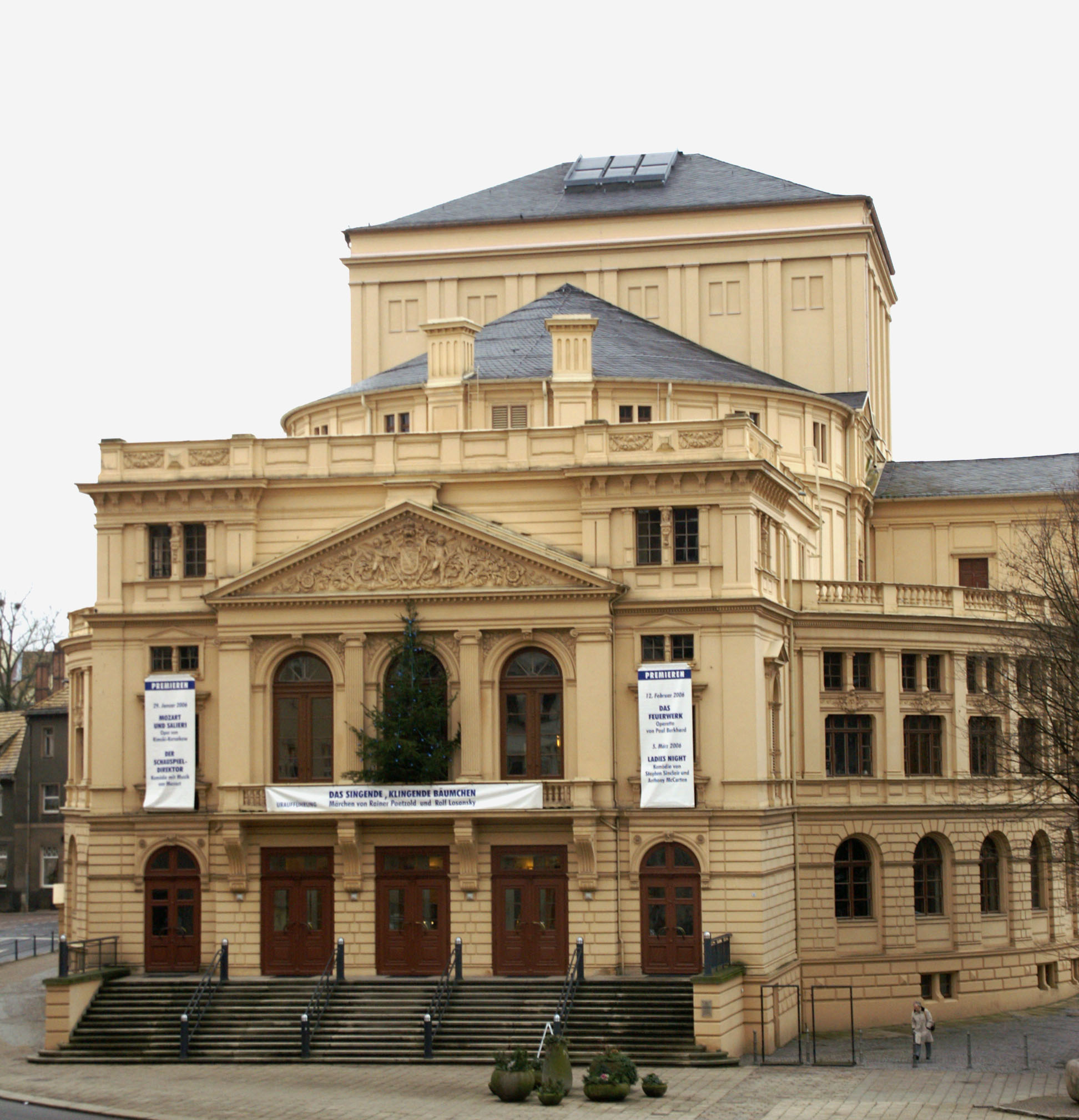
Großes Haus des Landestheaters Altenburg

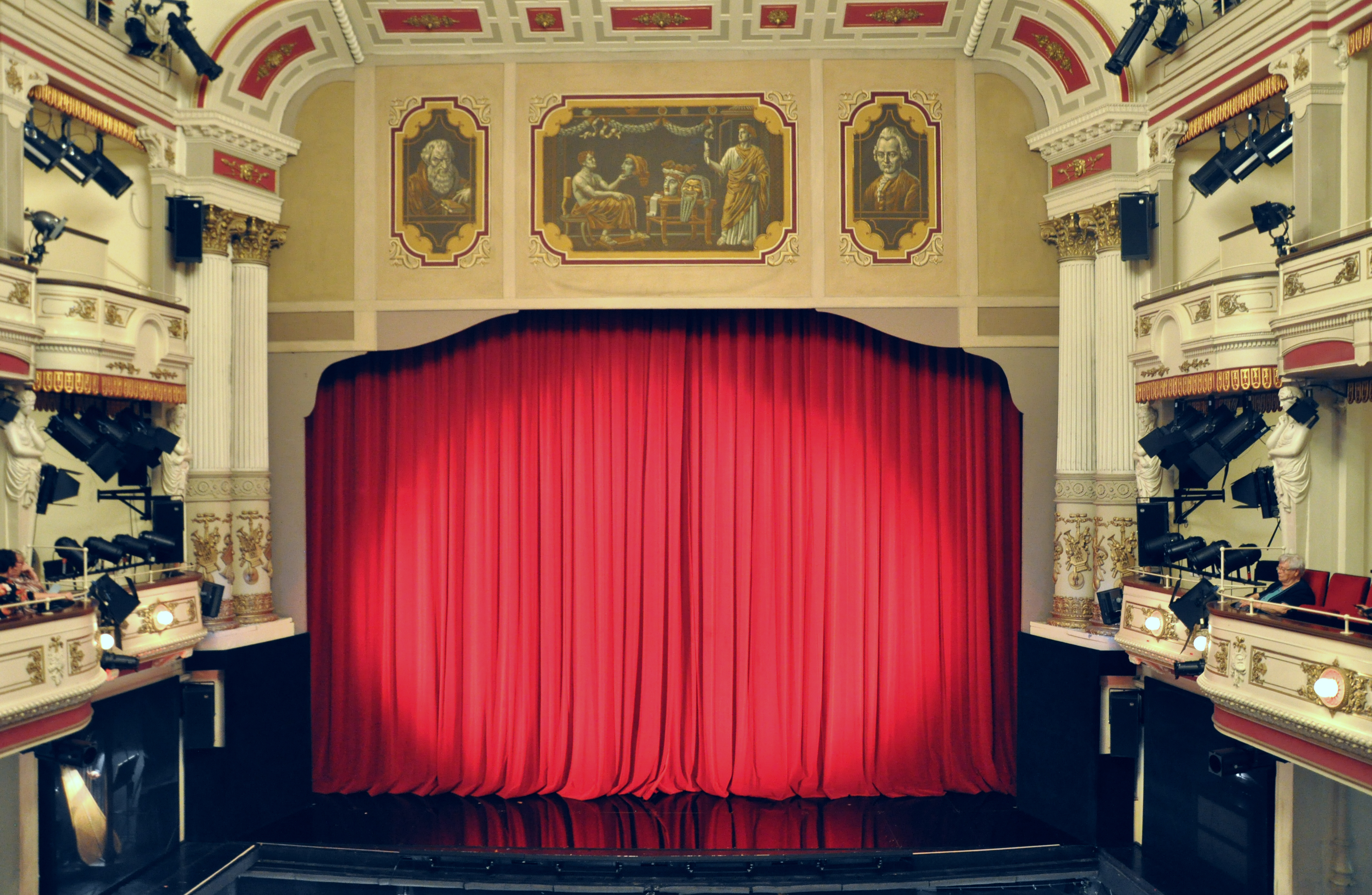
View of the stage

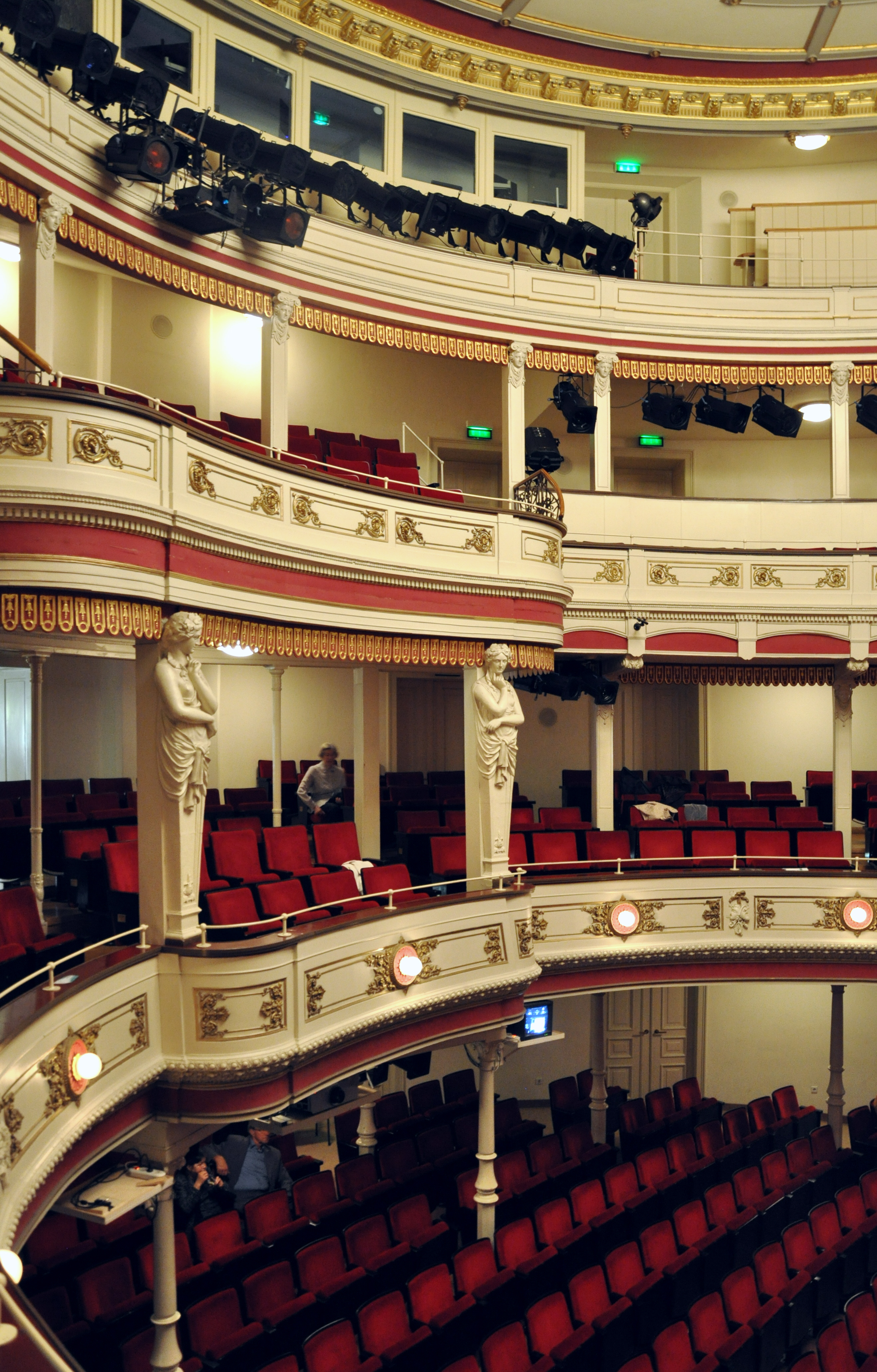
Zuschauerraum

The Landestheater Altenburg is a multi-part theatre in Altenburg and part of the Theater Altenburg-Gera. The venues used are the Großes Haus with 500 seats as well as the Heizhaus and the Theater unterm Dach. The general director and managing director since 2011 is Kay Kuntze.

== History ==
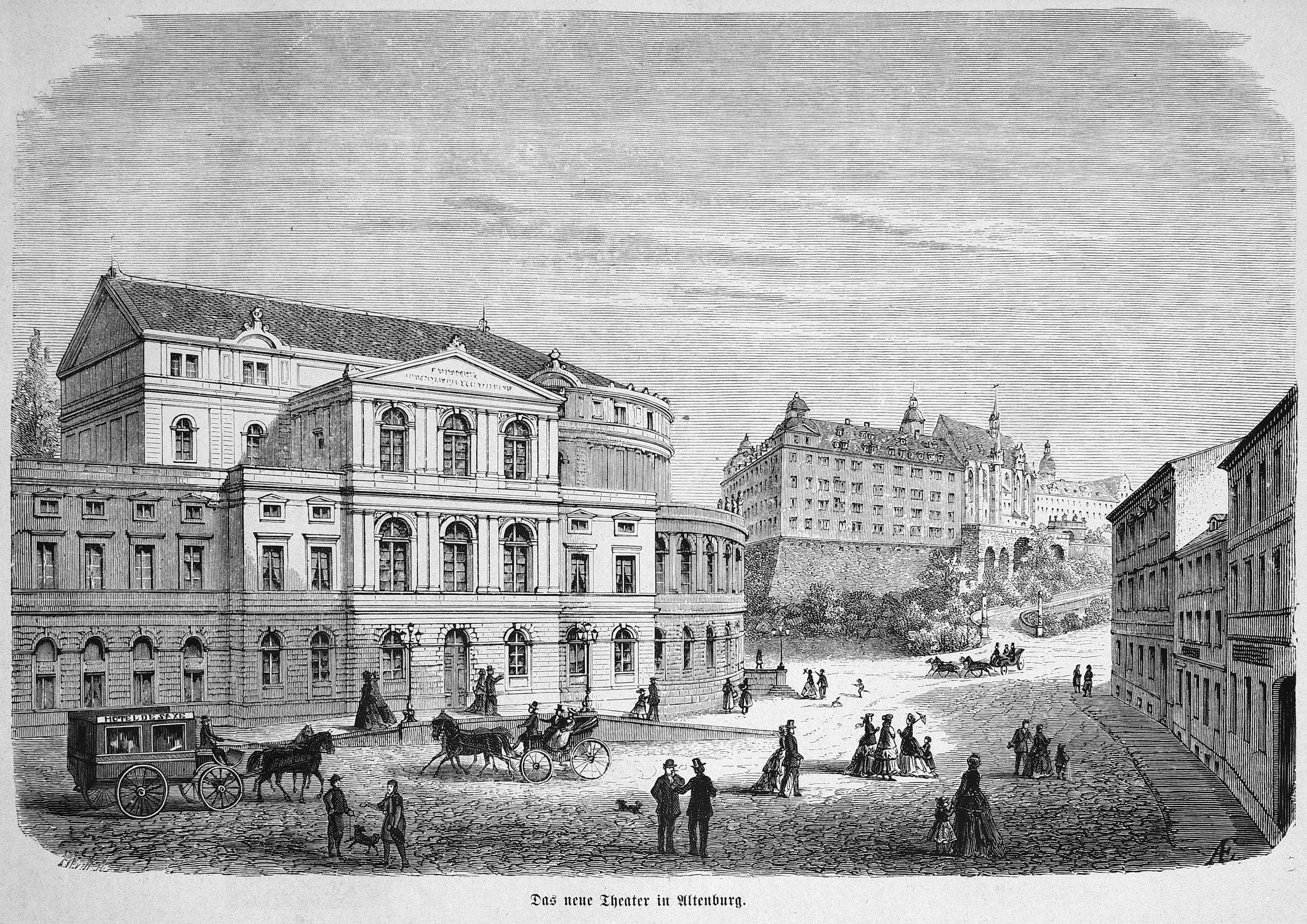
"Das neue Theater in Altenburg", in Die Gartenlaube 1871

=== The theatre years before 1871 ===
After the death of Friedrich III, Altenburg came to Duke Ernest II, Duke of Saxe-Gotha-Altenburg. In the former Schlossgartentheater, operas and melodramas by the Gotha Hofkapellmeister Gottfried Heinrich Stölzel and Georg Anton Benda were performed, e.g. Benda's melodramas Ariadne auf Naxos and Medea in 1775. In terms of actors, Friederike Caroline Neuber made guest appearances here for a long time around 1742 with her theatre company, and Konrad Ekhof from Gotha in 1775. In addition to plays by the young Lessing, plays by Diderot were also performed. When the theatre in the castle park was closed in 1779, there was an upsurge of civic initiatives: The stage in Pauritzer Gasse (1783-1842), later called "Altes Komödienhaus" (Old Comedy House), was converted by citizens of Altenburg from a barn into a "municipal theatre" with about 700 seats, including new types of stage equipment. Due to strong demand, mainly plays by Schiller were performed here. It was regularly visited by acting groups, e.g. in about 1818-1824 the company under theatre manager Sophie Walther and in 1820-1826 that of Carl Gerlach. The actor Carl Theodor Müller describes several engagements in Altenburg in his memoirs.

Among the most important musical performances were, for example. 1792 Mozart's Die Entführung aus dem Serail and 1812 Die Zauberflöte, 1822 Weber's Freischütz, 1825 Rossini's The Barber of Seville and Weber's Oberon, 1832 Auber's Fra Diavolo and 1843, under the conduct of the composer, Lortzing's play operas Zar und Zimmermann and Der Wildschütz (the young Albert Lortzing, born in 1801, had already appeared with his parents in Altenburg for the first time in the "Old Comedy House"), and the actress Wilhelmine Schröder-Devrient gave guest performances in 1842 as Norma, among others. Norma in the opera of the same name by Bellini. Among the most prominent guests at the time was Marie Seebach. A significant phase of development was initiated in 1860 by the court conductor Friedrich Wilhelm Stade, who was a friend of Liszt, Wagner and Berlioz. In 1849, the "Privat- und Familientheater-Gesellschaft zu Altenburg" was founded (dissolved in 1857) as the successor to the "Liebhaber-Theater-Gesellschaft" (1794-1802) and the "Privat-Theater-Gesellschaft" (1802-1822). In 1864, Shakespeare's Hamlet opened the last season in this theatre.

=== The "Ducal Court Theatre" 1871-1914 ===
In the middle of the 19th century, the Altenburg venues no longer met the demands of the public: in 1868, Duke Ernst I advocated the construction of a theatre in Altenburg. Thus, from 1869 to 1871, the "New Ducal Court Theatre" by architect Otto Brückwald, a pupil of Gottfried Semper, was built in the style of the Neo-Renaissance with three tiers (matroneum, balcony) and prosceniums and Mittellogen as well as a round ceiling mantle, whose allegorical paintings were created by the painter Höffemeyer from Munich. Including decoration and machinery, the construction costs amounted to approximately 350,000 marks. On 16 April 1871 the inauguration took place with Der Freischütz by Carl Maria von Weber under the direction of Wilhelm Stade, who was the musical director until 1874. The first season began on 24 September 1871 with Heinrich Laube's Die Karlsschüler In addition to Bellini, Donizetti, Mozart, Lortzing, Schiller, Kotzebue and Scribe, the repertoire also included plays by Birch-Pfeiffer. Stade left rehearsals to the 2nd Kapellmeister Georg Riemenschneider, under whose directinon the celebrated Altenburg premiere of Richard Wagner's Tannhäuser took place in 1873. In 1875, under the musical direction of Kapellmeister H. Heynke Wagner's Lohengrin and in 1876 Der fliegende Holländer. In 1886, Altenburg saw the first performances of Bizet's Carmen and Wagner's Meistersinger.

Operetta was also increasingly popular in these years with Jacques Offenbach's works and classical Viennese operetta such as Carl Millöcker's Der Bettelstudent and Die Fledermaus by Johann Strauss.

In 1882, the warehouse was added, in 1895 the administration building was added and the gas lighting was replaced by an electric system. In 1904/05 the theatre was rebuilt: New additions included a sophisticated interior with impressive ceiling paintings, golden ornaments and red upholstered seats in the large auditorium. The addition of the foyer wing in the style of romanticising classicism with a new façade gave the theatre a box office foyer, a main foyer and the installation of additional stairways for the tiers, in addition to the altered grand staircase. At the same time, the theatre was equipped with gas lighting. From 1893 to 1903, guest conductors included Alfred Hertz, Richard Sahla, Hans Chemin-Petit and Arthur Nikisch. A letter from Engelbert Humperdinck about the Altenburg premiere of his fairy-tale opera Hänsel und Gretel also dates from this period. In 1903, Georg Göhler was appointed Court Kapellmeister and ensured further first performances in the opera repertoire: Offenbach's Tales of Hoffmann in 1903, Puccini's Madama Butterfly in 1910, Smetana's The Bartered Bride and Wagner's The Ring of the Nibelung in 1909. In the field of drama, the performance of Goethe's Faust should be highlighted.

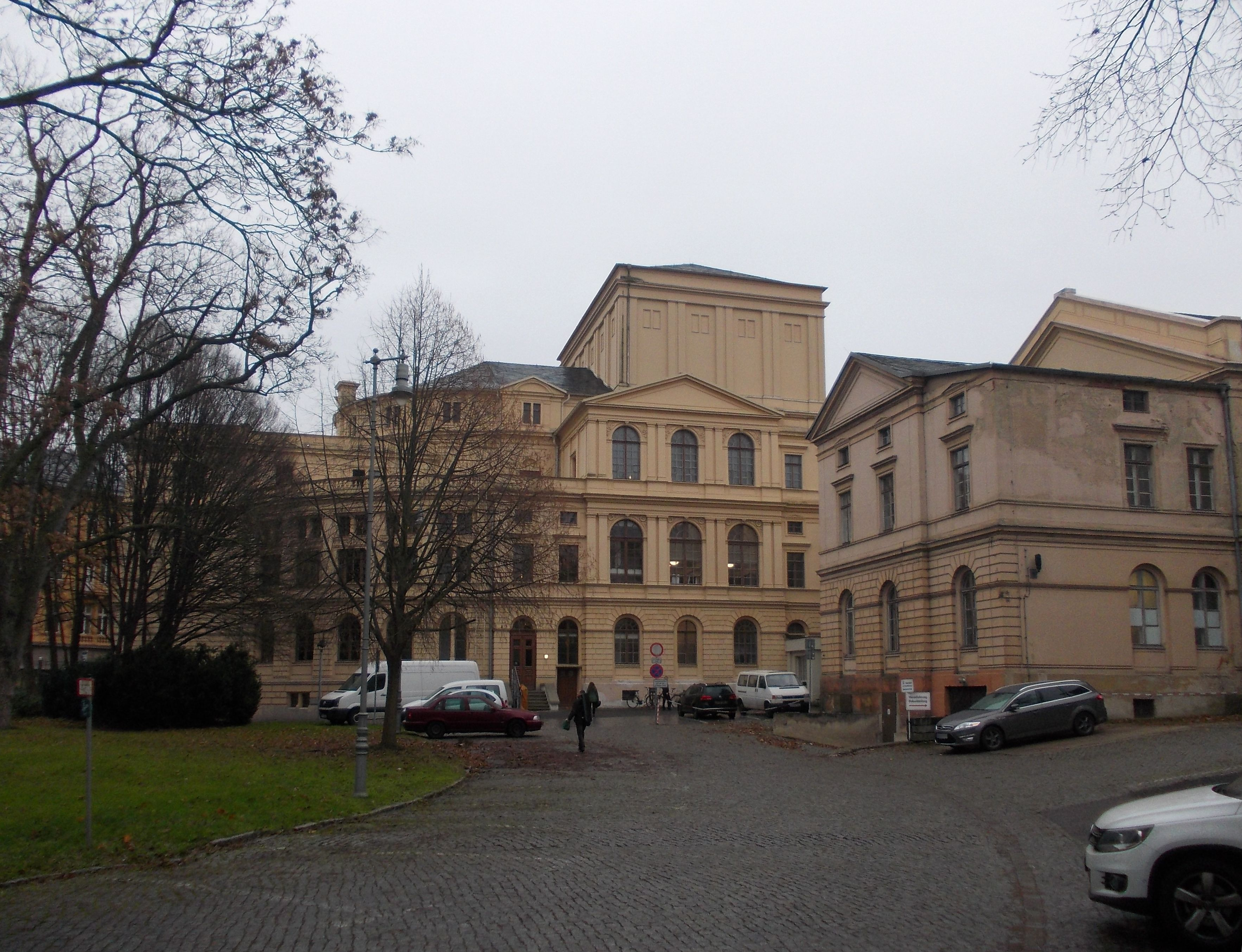
Integration of the theatre into the surrounding building complexes

During the First World War, performances included Verdi's Othello and Strauss' Salome, and Wagner's Der Ring des Nibelungen was performed again in 1919 under the newly engaged conductor Eugen Szenkar. Guests included tenor Richard Tauber, Wagner baritone Walter Soomer, cellist Julius Klengel, actress Tilla Durieux, actor Paul Wegener.

=== The Landestheater Altenburg 1918–1932 ===
After the abdication of Duke Ernst II, the principality became part of the Free State of Saxony-Altenburg in 1918 and was finally assigned to the Land Thüringen in 1920. From 1922, Georg Göhler was again appointed to the theatre, now called the Landestheater, and it was through him that a Verdi renaissance took place from here in Germany through the translation and arrangement of unknown Verdi operas.

Ernst Krenek's Jonny spielt auf and the world premiere of the new version of the two one-act operas Der Protagonist and Der Zar lässt sich photographieren by Kurt Weill were performed in the presence of the composer. In the repertoires of this period, the best-known works appearing alongside numerous world premieres are Hans Pfitzner's Der armer Heinrich, Janáček's Jenůfa, Puccini's Turandot, Mussorgski's Boris Godunov and Wagner's Parsifal. Guest performances included actor and singer Ludwig Wüllner and actress Asta Nielsen, operetta composer Eduard Künneke conducted the world premiere of his operetta Die blonde Liselott and also premiered his opera Nadja. In drama, Frau Warrens Gewerbe by George Bernard Shaw, Ingeborg by Curt Goetz, Gerhart Hauptmann's Dorothea Angermann were on the programme.

Due to the increasing effects of inflation, in 1925 the Thuringian state government cut back on financial state subsidies, whereupon the "Association of Theatre Friends" was founded in Altenburg. at the suggestion of the music teacher and writer Karl Gabler They succeeded in objecting to all the government's plans to cut the theatre and thus prevented Altenburg from being damaged in this important branch of culture. In 1927/28, the theatre merged with the Principality of Reuss-Gera theatre, but was dissolved before the end of the trial year due to inefficiency.

On 2 May 1932, under the auspices of the gymnastics club of Altenburg, a "beauty commercial gymnastics" took place in the theatre, in which the renowned artistic gymnasts Walter Bettermann, Erich Bockenauer, Hans Kessler, Arthur Kleine, Kurt Krötzsch, Alfred Müller (gymnast), Erich Polmar, Karl Popp, Alfred Schwarzmann, Kurt Wedekind, Erwin Tretner, Hans Echost, Otto Müller and Otto Rothe showed their skills.

=== 1933–1945 ===
From 1932 to 1937, the orchestra was led by Heinz Drewes with the new name Staatskapelle Altenburg. The repertoire for the 1936/37 season included the following works for the members of the Staatskapelle: in addition to Beethoven's Fidelio, Oberon, Hänsel und Gretel, Undine, Thannhäuser, as a world premiere Hanns Ludwig Kormann's Belcanto, Alberts Tiefland, Mussorgsky's Boris Godunov, Strauss' Elektra, Mozart's Così fan tutte, Donizetti's Don Pasquale, Gounod's Margarethe, Verdi's Un ballo in maschera and Puccini's Manon Lescaut, plus a closed Ring performance and Parsifal, Eine Alpensinfonie by Strauss. In addition, guest performances by well-known artists such as actors Heinz Rühmann and Curd Jürgens, dancer Mary Wigman, soprano Maria Cebotari and singers Peter Anders and Karl Schmitt-Walter. From 1943 to 1945, the Landestheater Altenburg served as a training centre for the Richard Wagner grandchildren.

=== 1945–1989 ===
In the wartime winter of 1944/45, the theatre had to remain closed due to the general mobilisation, but was already reopened in the summer of 1945: On 9 August 1945, first major opera performance with Albert Lortzing's Waffenschmied, first operetta on 19 August with Der Vetter aus Dingsda. Finally, the acting ensemble followed with the two one act Der Kammersänger by Frank Wedekind and Der grüne Kakadu by Arthur Schnitzler.

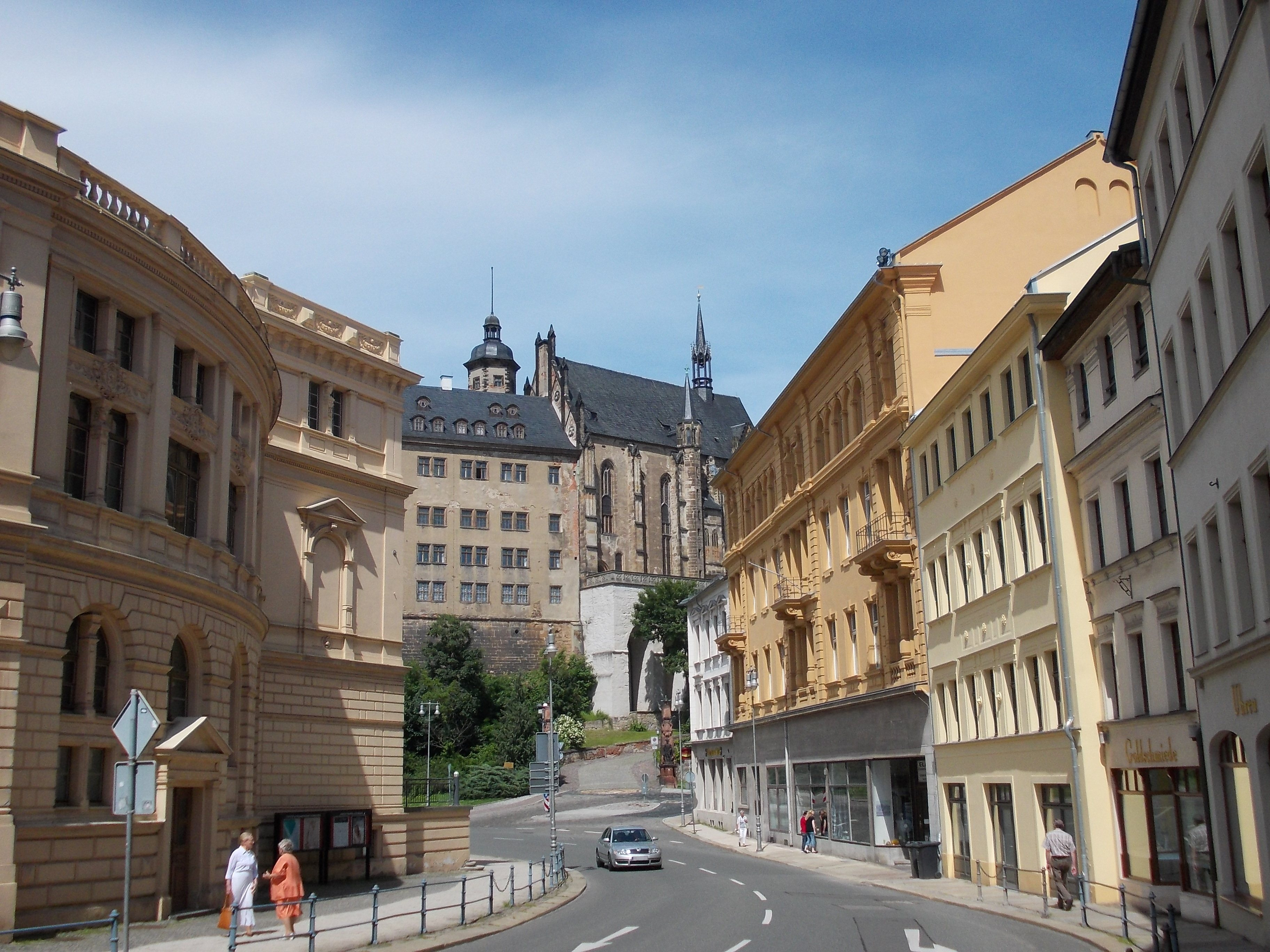
View from the theatre square to Altenburg Castle

In 1946/47, a revolving stage was installed and the Seckendorff Palace was attached to the theatre as a kind of functional building. In the post-war years, the party and state leadership attached great importance to the theatre being used to deal with the major social conflicts. The theatre was to develop into a "true people's theatre", i.e. a "socialist theatre", far removed from "amusement theatre in the usual sense". In 1956 the machinery in the theatre was replaced, in 1978 a new revolving stage was installed and in 1988 a fully automatic light control room was installed. In the same year, the new boiler house was put into operation, along with a new heating system.

Not least under the directorship of Peter Posdzech, the Landestheater Altenburg experienced years of widespread recognition even beyond the borders of the time, especially with Wagner's and Verdi's operas, whose continuous performances became an independent Altenburg tradition. In 1983/84, the Landestheater Altenburg was given the status of a theatre promoting young talent: young singers who came from universities or studios were promoted here in appropriate roles or parts and prepared for their future careers; the "Seminar for Young Opera Conductors" was also established.

=== 1989 until today ===
In 1993, a thorough renovation of the building began: within two years, the exterior façade was restored and the interior of the theatre was also adapted to modern requirements; the basic architecture, however, was retained. On 2 October 1995, the Großes Haus was again inaugurated with Weber's Der Freischütz. Particularly noteworthy are musical theatre productions such as La Cage aux Folles, The Buddy Holly Story, Kiss Me, Kate, Grease, Yesterday as a tribute to The Beatles and with performances of Bertolt Brecht's The Resistible Rise of Arturo Ui, and Astoria by Jura Soyfer.

After the last productions of its own, Salome and The Rite of Spring, the Landestheater Altenburg merged with the stages of the city of Gera in 1995 to form the "Theater Altenburg-Gera" in the course of a restructuring initiated by the state of Thuringia. This was renamed "Theater & Philharmonie Thüringen" in 2006. The Altenburg section is once again operating under the former title "Landestheater Altenburg". As a so-called multi-speciality theatre, it promotes musical theatre as well as dramas, ballets and concerts. Experimental productions in particular are also promoted in the adjoining Heizhaus, and children's performances and puppet theatres take place in the Theater unterm Dach. In total, about 300 performances are offered annually. Since summer 2019 until presumably spring 2021, the theatre is closed for restoration and reconstruction measures. For this time, a tent has been erected on Altenburg's festival square, which serves as an interim venue. At the start of the 19/20 season, or in August 2019, the theatre will be reopened under its new name, Theater Altenburg-Gera.
