= Otmar Suitner =

Austrian conductor (1922–2010)

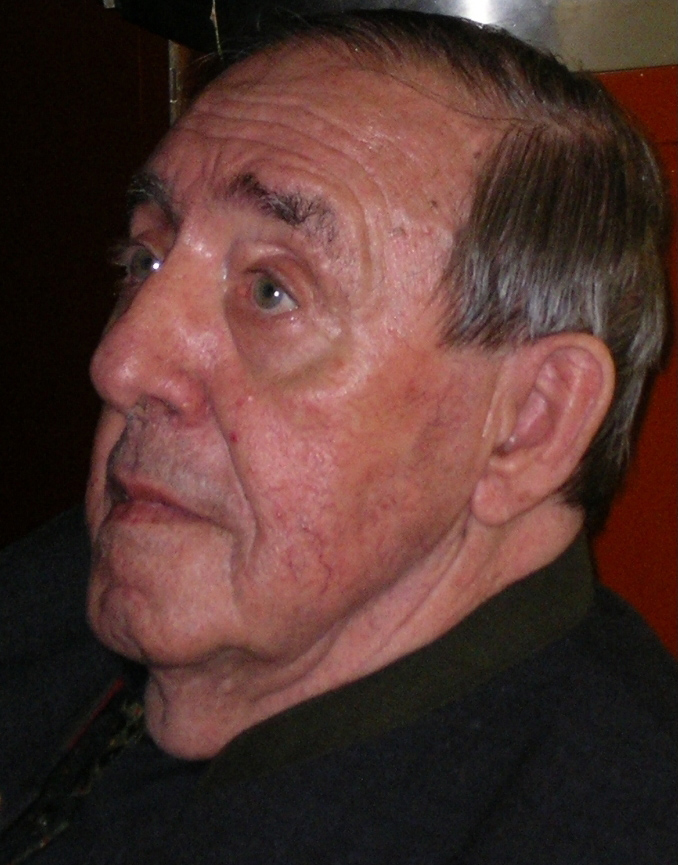
Otmar Suitner, 2007

Otmar Suitner (German pronunciation: [ˈɔtmaʁ zuˈiːtnɐ]; 16 May 1922 – 8 January 2010) was an Austrian conductor who spent most of his professional career in East Germany. He was born in Innsbruck and died in Berlin. He was principal conductor of the Staatskapelle Dresden from 1960 to 1964, and then music director at the Berlin State Opera in East Berlin from 1964 to 1990. He was concurrently chief conductor of the Staatskapelle Berlin from 1964 to 1991. (It has been common practice that the same conductor is responsible for leading both institutions.)

A fairly prolific recording artist, he was particularly notable in Austro-German music, having conducted discs of works by Max Reger and Paul Hindemith as well as the first Beethoven symphony cycle to be released on compact disc. He taught at the Mozarteum for twenty years. From 1977 to 1990 Suitner was professor of conducting at the University of Music and Performing Arts Vienna. Among his prize students was American conductor Donald Covert, who received the "Swarovsky Conducting Diploma" in 1984.

He was awarded the National Prize of the German Democratic Republic, 2nd Class for art and literature, in 1963.

In East Berlin, Suitner was married to Marita Wilckens (1924–2008), daughter of the composer Friedrich Wilckens. In 1965 he became acquainted with the West German student Renate Heitzmann and had a son, Igor, with her in 1975 in West Berlin. Igor produced a documentary in 2007 about his father, A Father's Music.
