= Günther Leib =

German opera singer (1927–2024)

- Günther Leib, c. 1970
- Born: 12 April 1927; Gotha, Germany
- Died: 5 March 2024 (aged 96); Dresden, Saxony, Germany
- Education: Hochschule für Musik Franz Liszt
- Occupations: Operatic baritone; Academic teacher
- Organizations: Dresden State Opera; Berlin State Opera; Hochschule für Musik Carl Maria von Weber; Hochschule für Musik "Hanns Eisler"
- Title: Kammersänger

Günther Leib (12 April 1927 – 5 March 2024) was a German operatic baritone and professor of voice. A Kammersänger of the Dresden State Opera, he sang leading baritone roles both in his native Germany and internationally during the course of his stage career. In 1971 he was awarded the Robert Schumann Prize of the City of Zwickau and in 2017 on the occasion of his 90th birthday the "Gotha-Medaille" (Gotha Medal), honoring him for his international career as "Gotha's most famous voice". He appeared in a number of complete opera and oratorio recordings on the Eterna, Supraphon, and Deutsche Grammophon labels.

== Life and career ==
Leib was born in Gotha on 12 April 1927, where he began studying the violin at the age of seven. When World War II ended, he continued his studies at the State Conservatory in Erfurt and was engaged as a violinist in the Gotha municipal orchestra in 1949. The orchestra's concerts often included opera and operetta, which piqued his interest in the art form. He studied voice privately at first. Then, encouraged by his teacher, he enrolled in the Weimar Conservatory, graduating in 1952 with a diploma in opera and concert singing and music pedagogy. That same year, he made his stage debut in Köthen as Bartolo in Rossini's Il barbiere di Siviglia.

After singing in the theatres of Köthen, Meiningen and Nordhausen, Leib went on to become a member of the Dresden State Opera from 1957 and the Berlin State Opera from 1961. In the late 1950s, he also went on concert tours in Italy, Egypt and Great Britain. He made his Metropolitan Opera debut in 1976 as Beckmesser in Die Meistersinger von Nürnberg, a role he had sung the previous year at the Salzburg Easter Festival. Of his Met debut as Beckmesser, Raymond Ericson wrote in The New York Times:

Gunther Leib, a bass from East Germany, was a first rate Beckmesser. He sang his music instead of barking it. He did not burlesque the character, but gave it a smug stupidity that was all too real. His complacent singing in the final scene was both original and superbly carried off.

Leib also sang as a guest artist at the Bolshoi Theatre in Moscow, the Paris Opera, and the opera houses of Budapest, Prague, Sofia, Hamburg, Helsinki and Stockholm.

In addition to his performing career in opera and concert, Leib was a professor of voice at the Hochschule für Musik Carl Maria von Weber in Dresden from 1964 to 1976 and then from 1976 at the Hochschule für Musik "Hanns Eisler" in Berlin. Twice widowed, Leib retired to Dresden, where he lived with his third wife Adelheid née Gähler.

Leib died on 5 March 2024, at the age of 96.

== Recordings ==
Leib first performed at the annual Handel Festival in Halle in 1957 and returned there frequently. Several recordings of his Handel performances from the 1950s and 1960s were re-released on CD by Berlin Classics, including:

- Poro (as Poro), Horst-Tanu Margraf (conductor), recorded in 1958
- Radamisto (as Tiridate), Horst-Tanu Margraf (conductor), recorded in 1962
- Imeneo (as Imeneo), Horst-Tanu Margraf (conductor), recorded in 1965
- Dettingen Te Deum (baritone soloist), Helmut Koch (conductor), recorded in 1969

Leib appears in a number of complete opera recordings on the Eterna, Supraphon and Deutsche Grammophon labels, including:

- Smetana: Die verkaufte Braut (as Krušina), Otmar Suitner (conductor), recorded in 1962
- d'Albert: Tiefland (as Moruccio), Paul Schmitz (conductor), recorded in 1963
- Mozart: Die Zauberflöte (as Papageno), Otmar Suitner (conductor), recorded in 1968
- Benda: Der Dorfjahrmarkt (as Fickfack), Hans von Benda (conductor), recorded in 1968
- Mozart: Così fan tutte (as Guglielmo, one of Leib's signature roles), Otmar Suitner (conductor), recorded in 1969
- Weber: Der Freischütz (as Kilian), Carlos Kleiber (conductor), recorded in 1973
- Wagner: Rienzi (as Cecco del Vecchio), Heinrich Hollreiser (conductor), recorded in 1974/1976
- Dessau: Einstein (as Giordano Bruno), Otmar Suitner (conductor), recorded in 1977

Leib was also known for his performances in oratorio and sacred music from the earliest days of his career—he was the voice of Christ in a 1957 performance of Bach's St John Passion in Italy conducted by Franz Konwitschny. His recordings in this genre include:

- Schütz: Lukas-Passion (as bass soloist), Rudolf Mauersberger (conductor), recorded in 1965
- Bach: Matthäus-Passion (as bass soloist), Rudolf Mauersberger (conductor), recorded in 1970
- Brahms: Ein deutsches Requiem (as baritone soloist), Helmut Koch (conductor), recorded in 1972
