= List of works for the stage by Kurt Weill =

This is a complete list of the stage works by Kurt Weill (1900–1950).

== Works ==
Title	Genre	Subdivisions	Libretto	Première date	Place, theatre
Zriny	opera		after a tragedy by Theodor Körner	composed 1916, but lost	
Ninon von Lenclos	opera		based on a drama by Ernst Hardt	composed 1920, but lost	
Zaubernacht	ballet with song	1 act	Wladimir Boritsch	18 November 1922	Berlin, Theater am Kurfürstendamm
Der Protagonist	opera	1 act	Georg Kaiser	27 March 1926	Dresden, Staatsoper
Royal Palace, Op. 17	opera	1 act	Yvan Goll	2 March 1927	Berlin, Krolloper
Na und?			Felix Joachimson	composed 1926–1927, but unperformed and lost	
Mahagonny-Songspiel	Songspiel	3 acts	Bertolt Brecht and Elisabeth Hauptmann	17 July 1927	Baden-Baden, Kurhaus
Der Zar lässt sich photographieren	opera buffa	1 act	Georg Kaiser	18 February 1928	Leipzig, Neues Theater
Die Dreigroschenoper (The Threepenny Opera)	play with music	prologue and 8 scenes	Bertolt Brecht and Elisabeth Hauptmann, after The Beggar's Opera by John Gay	31 August 1928	Berlin, Theater am Schiffbauerdamm
Happy End	comedy with music	3 acts	Elisabeth Hauptmann and Bertolt Brecht	2 September 1929	Berlin, Theater am Schiffbauerdamm
Aufstieg und Fall der Stadt Mahagonny	opera	3 acts	Bertolt Brecht and Elisabeth Hauptmann	9 March 1930	Leipzig, Neues Theater
Der Jasager	Schuloper	2 acts	Bertolt Brecht and Elisabeth Hauptmann, after Hauptmann's translation from Arthur Waley's English version of the Japanese No drama Taniko	23 June 1930	Berlin
Die Bürgschaft	opera	prologue and 3 acts	Caspar Neher, after Johann Gottfried Herder's parable Der afrikanische Rechtspruch	10 March 1932	Berlin, Städtische Oper
Die sieben Todsünden	ballet chanté	8 parts	Bertolt Brecht	7 June 1933	Paris, Théâtre des Champs-Élysées
Der Silbersee	play with music	3 acts	Georg Kaiser	18 February 1933	Leipzig, Altes Theater & Stadttheater Magdeburg & Theater Erfurt
Marie Galante	play with music	2 acts	Jacques Deval	22 December 1934	Paris, Théâtre de Paris
Der Kuhhandel	operetta	2 acts	Robert Vambery	composed 1934 but not performed until: 22 March 1990	Düsseldorf (in concert)
A Kingdom for a Cow (revision of Der Kuhhandel)	musical play	3 acts	Reginald Arkell and D Carter	28 June 1935	London, Savoy Theatre
Der Weg der Verheißung	biblical drama	4 acts	Franz Werfel	composed 1934–1935, but unperformed until: 13 June 1999	Chemnitz, Theater Chemnitz
Johnny Johnson	musical play	3 acts	Paul Green	19 November 1936	New York, 44th Street Theatre
The Eternal Road (revision of Der Weg der Verheißung)	biblical drama	4 acts	Franz Werfel	7 January 1937	New York City, Manhattan Opera House
Knickerbocker Holiday	musical comedy	2 acts	Maxwell Anderson	26 September 1938	Hartford, Connecticut
Davy Crockett	musical play	2 acts	H. R. Hays	composed 1938, but unfinished	
Railroads on Parade (A Fantasy on Rail Transport)	circus opera		Edward Hungerford	30 April 1939	New York World's Fair
Ulysses Africanus	musical play	2 acts	Maxwell Anderson	composed 1939, but unfinished	material later used in Lost in the Stars
Lady in the Dark	musical play	2 acts	Moss Hart and Ira Gershwin	23 January 1941	New York, Alvin Theatre
Fun to Be Free	pageant play		Various artists from Fight for Freedom: other composers also involved	5 October 1941	New York, Madison Square Garden
We Will Never Die	pageant play		Ben Hecht	9 March 1943	New York, Madison Square Garden
One Touch of Venus	musical comedy	2 acts	Ogden Nash	7 October 1943	New York, Imperial Theatre
The Firebrand of Florence	operetta	2 acts	Ira Gershwin	22 March 1944	New York, Alvin Theatre
A Flag is Born	pageant		Ben Hecht	5 September 1945	New York, Alvin Theatre
Street Scene	American opera	2 acts	Elmer Rice and Langston Hughes	9 January 1947	New York, Adelphi Theatre
Down in the Valley	folk opera	1 act	Arnold Sundgaard	15 July 1948	Bloomington, Indiana University
Love Life	vaudeville	2 parts	Alan Jay Lerner	7 October 1948	New York, 46th Street Theatre
Lost in the Stars	musical tragedy	2 acts	Maxwell Anderson	30 October 1949	New York, Music Box Theatre
Huckleberry Finn	musical	2 acts	Maxwell Anderson after Mark Twain	composed 1950, but unfinished	
