= Vambery =

Vambery or Vámbéry is a Hungarian surname and may refer to:

- Ármin Vámbéry, also Arminius Vámbéry (1832–1913), Hungarian traveller, philologist
- Robert Vambery (1907–1999), Hungarian born German, later American, theatre director and author
- Rustem Vambery (1872–1948), Hungarian jurist, politician

== See also ==
- 185196 Vámbéry, minor planet, named after Ármin Vámbéry
