= Bregenzer Festspiele =

Music festival

Coordinates: 47°30′18″N 9°44′16″E

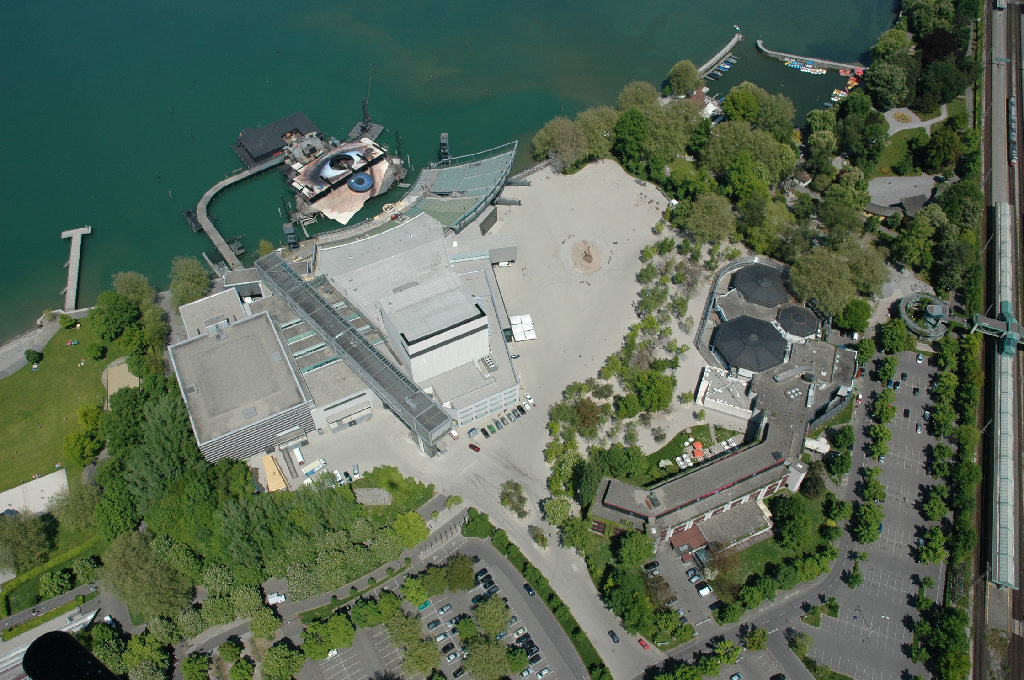
- Aerial view of the stage of the Bregenzer Festspiele at and on Lake Constance (2008)
- Status: Active
- Genre: Opera, Musical, Performance
- Venue: Seebühne (floating stage), Festspielhaus (amongst others)
- Locations: Bregenz, Vorarlberg
- Country: Austria
- Inaugurated: 1946
- Next event: 2025
- Capacity: 11,735 seats
- Budget: 22 million € per year
- Sponsor: Public subsidies: 6,94 million €, funds from sponsors and donors: 1,3 million €
- Website: bregenzerfestspiele.com/en

Bregenzer Festspiele (German pronunciation: [ˌbreːɡɛntsɐ ˈfɛst.ʃpiːlə]; Bregenz Festival) is a performing arts festival which is held every July and August in Bregenz, Vorarlberg, Austria. It features a large floating stage which is situated on Lake Constance.

== History ==
The Festival became an international event in its first year 1946, one year after World War II. People from Germany, Switzerland and France came to the festival. Two stages were created out of floating barges. One barge for the Vienna Symphony Orchestra and the other barge for carrying stage structures.

The Vienna Symphony Orchestra is the biggest contributor to the Festival. This orchestra has a performance spot every year since the beginning of the festival. They have their own stage area and other venues used thorough out the festival. Every year the orchestra has a different conductor for each piece because it is considered the conductors performance. Kornmarktplatz, vorarlberg museum is the venture they are using for the 2016 Festival.

In 2001, the festival created a handful of contemporary arts events to go along with their usual performances. These events were a new collaboration with the Kunsthaus Bregenz that revolved around the theme of "America of the 20th century", and The Art of Our Times program, also known as KAZ, that brought together contemporary theatre with Workshop Theatre while collaborating with Hamburg's Thalia Theater. Other add-ons that the festival created for more variety and entertainment are the Children's Festival, the opera and band workshops, and family and school-group concerts.

From December 2003 until 2014, David Pountney has been the artistic director of the festival.

Over April and May 2008, scenes for the 22nd James Bond film Quantum of Solace were filmed on the Seebühne during a performance of Tosca and in June 2008 the German broadcasting corporation ZDF hosted its 2008 European Football Championship live broadcast studio on the floating stage.

In 2010, the festival offered about 100 performances that drew an audience of close to 200,000.

2015 was the first year for Elisabeth Sobotka as artistic director. She started with 80 events and by end of August 2015, further founded the Opera Studio with the goal "to help young singers with their professional and personal development in a highly professional environment and also to create a staging that the audience will really enjoy".

The season of year drew an audience of approx. 257,000. Carmen proved to be very popular and was mostly fully booked with a total audience number of 193,642 people, already including the dress rehearsal and crossculture night. In 2018, the Bregenz Festival broke its own record: With 270,000 visitors in only 5 weeks, the festival attained a new attendance record. It attracted 400,000 people in total when the programme featured Bizet's Carmen in 2017 and 2018.

The Bregenz Festival continues to show a series of popular Puccini works. La Bohème was the first Puccini performance in 2001/02, followed by Tosca in 2007/08 and most recently Turandot in 2015 and 2016, Madame Butterfly in 2021/22 will be the fourth opera by the Italian composer to be performed in Bregenz.

The festival offers guided tours from May to August.

The Bregenzer Festspiele had to cancel the 2020 festival due to the COVID-19 pandemic. The performances of Rigoletto and the opera Nero have been postponed to 2021.

== Venues ==
The festival presents a wide variety of musical and theatrical events in the following venues:

- Seebühne (or floating stage), with its 7,000 seat open-air amphitheatre, is the location for large-scale opera or musical performances on a stage over water on the shores of Lake Constance.

Opera or musical productions on the floating stage generally tend to come from the popular operatic repertoire, but often are extravagantly original and innovative productions/ stagings, frequently using the waters of the lake as an extension of the stage. Recent productions have included Aida by Giuseppe Verdi in 2009 & 2010; Tosca by Giacomo Puccini in 2007–2008; Il trovatore by Giuseppe Verdi in 2005–2006; West Side Story by Leonard Bernstein in 2003-2004; La bohème by Giacomo Puccini in 2001–2002, and Ein Maskenball (Un ballo in maschera) by Giuseppe Verdi in 1999–2000.

- Festspielhaus presents performances of rarely performed opera and concerts.
- Werkstattbühne presents performances of contemporary theatre and opera.
- Theater am Kornmarkt presents operetta and drama performances.
- shed8/Theater Kosmos venue for drama and crossculture performances.

== Plays, musicals, and operas performed ==
Throughout the seasons, the festival puts on many different performances; from operas to plays and orchestral pieces. The performances range in theme and story and many are performed in consecutive seasons. The full list of shows performed is as follows:

Year	Spiel auf dem See (floating stage)	Festspielhaus
2029	The Flying Dutchman by Richard Wagner	
2028	The Flying Dutchman by Richard Wagner	
2027	La traviata by Giuseppe Verdi	Penthesilea by Othmar Schoeck
2026	La traviata by Giuseppe Verdi	The Excursions of Mr. Brouček to the Moon and to the 15th Century by Leoš Janáček
2025	Der Freischütz by Carl Maria von Weber	Œdipe by George Enescu
2024	Der Freischütz by Carl Maria von Weber	Tancredi by Gioachino Rossini
2023	Madame Butterfly by Giacomo Puccini	Ernani by Giuseppe Verdi
2022	Madame Butterfly by Giacomo Puccini	Siberia by Umberto Giordano
2021	~~Madame Butterfly by Giacomo Puccini~~; Rigoletto by Giuseppe Verdi (postponed performance)	Nero by Arrigo Boito (postponed performance)
~~2020~~	Rigoletto by Giuseppe Verdi	~~Nero by Arrigo Boito~~ (cancelled)
2019	Rigoletto by Giuseppe Verdi	Don Quichotte by Jules Massenet
2018	Carmen by Georges Bizet	Beatrice Cenci by Berthold Goldschmidt
2017	Carmen by Georges Bizet	Mosè in Egitto by Gioachino Rossini
2016	Turandot by Giacomo Puccini	Amleto by Franco Faccio
2015	Turandot by Giacomo Puccini	The Tales of Hoffmann by Jacques Offenbach
2014	The Magic Flute by Wolfgang Amadeus Mozart	Tales from the Vienna Woods by Heinz Karl Gruber, originally by Ödön von Horváth (commission)
2013	The Magic Flute by Wolfgang Amadeus Mozart	The Merchant of Venice by André Tchaikowsky
2012	André Chénier by Umberto Giordano	Siberia by Detlev Glanert (commission)
2011	André Chénier by Umberto Giordano	Miss Fortune as "Achterbahn" (rollercoaster) by Judith Weir (commission)
2010	Aida by Giuseppe Verdi	The Passenger by Mieczysław Weinberg
2009	Aida by Giuseppe Verdi	King Roger by Karol Szymanowski
2008	Tosca by Giacomo Puccini	Karl V by Ernst Křenek
2007	Tosca by Giacomo Puccini	Death in Venice by Benjamin Britten
2006	Il trovatore by Giuseppe Verdi	The Fall of the House of Usher by Claude Debussy
2005	Il trovatore by Giuseppe Verdi	Maskarade by Carl Nielsen
2004	West Side Story by Leonard Bernstein	Der Protagonist and Royal Palace by Kurt Weill
2003	West Side Story by Leonard Bernstein	The Cunning Little Vixen by Leoš Janáček
2002	La bohème by Giacomo Puccini	Julietta by Bohuslav Martinů
2001	La bohème by Giacomo Puccini	Of Mice and Men by Carlisle Floyd
2000	A Masked Ball by Giuseppe Verdi	The Golden Cockerel by Nikolai Rimsky-Korsakov
1999	A Masked Ball by Giuseppe Verdi	The Greek Passion by Bohuslav Martinů
1998	Porgy and Bess by George Gershwin	L'amore dei tre re by Italo Montemezzi
1997	Porgy and Bess by George Gershwin	The Demon by Anton Rubinstein
1996	Fidelio by Ludwig van Beethoven	Le roi Arthus by Ernest Chausson
1995	Fidelio by Ludwig van Beethoven	The Legend of the Invisible City of Kitezh and the Maiden Fevroniya by Nikolai Rimsky-Korsakov
1994	Nabucco by Giuseppe Verdi	Francesca da Rimini by Riccardo Zandonai
1993	Nabucco by Giuseppe Verdi	Fedora by Umberto Giordano
1992	Carmen by Georges Bizet	La damnation de Faust by Hector Berlioz
1991	Carmen by Georges Bizet	Mazeppa by Pyotr Ilyich Tchaikovsky
1990	The Flying Dutchman by Richard Wagner	La Wally by Alfredo Catalani
1989	The Flying Dutchman by Richard Wagner	Samson and Delilah by Camille Saint-Saëns
1988	The Tales of Hoffmann by Jacques Offenbach	Samson and Delilah by Camille Saint-Saëns
1987	The Tales of Hoffmann by Jacques Offenbach	Ernani by Giuseppe Verdi
1986	The Magic Flute by Wolfgang Amadeus Mozart	Anna Bolena by Gaetano Donizetti
1985	The Magic Flute by Wolfgang Amadeus Mozart	I puritani by Vincenzo Bellini
1984	Der Vogelhändler by Carl Zeller	Tosca by Giacomo Puccini
1983	Kiss Me, Kate by Cole Porter	Der Freischütz by Carl Maria von Weber
1982	The Gypsy Baron by Johann Strauss II	Lucia di Lammermoor by Gaetano Donizetti
1981	West Side Story by Leonard Bernstein	Otello by Giuseppe Verdi
1980	Die Entführung aus dem Serail by Wolfgang Amadeus Mozart	Falstaff by Giuseppe Verdi

== Facts and figures ==
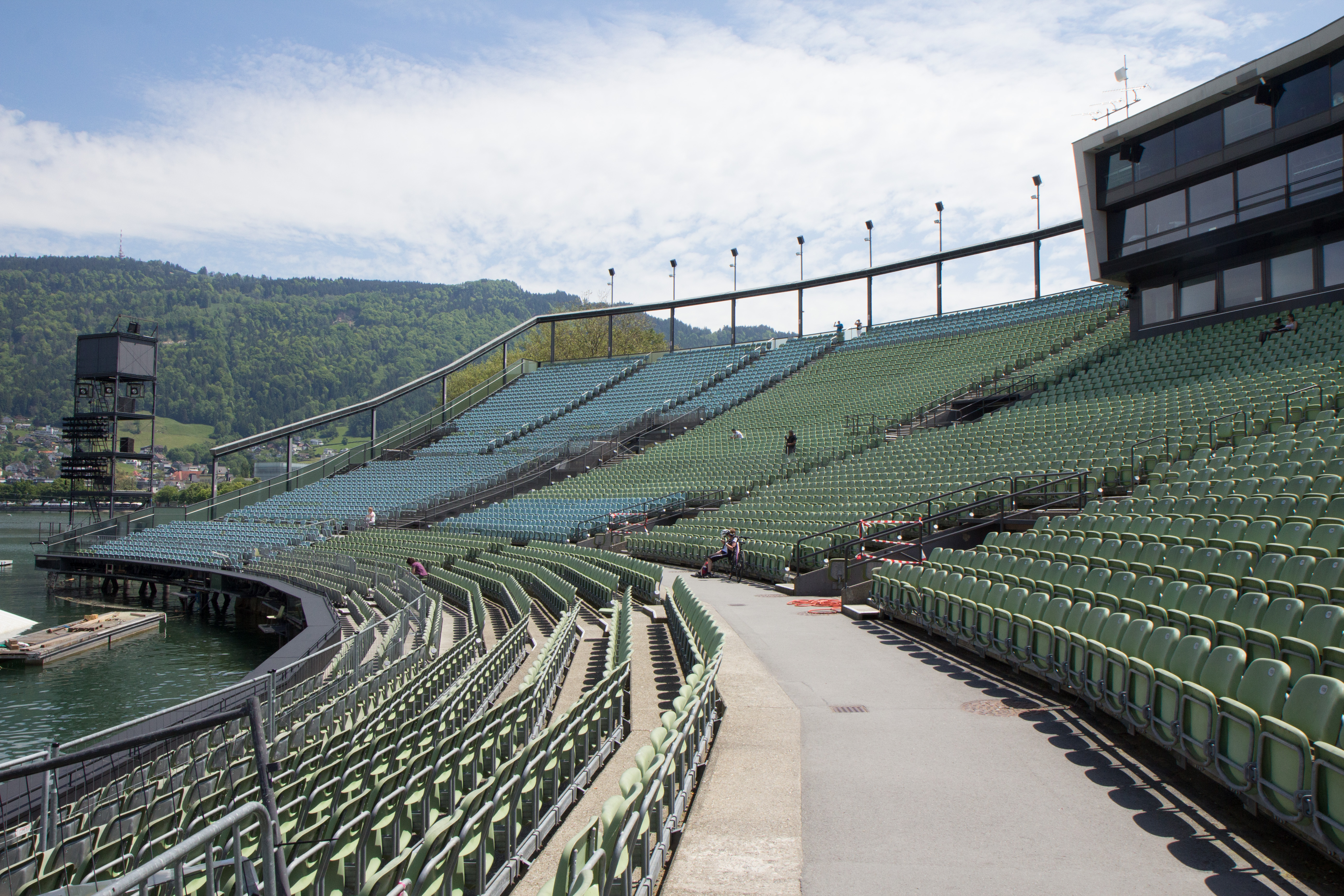
The Seebühne seats at the 2017 performance of the opera Carmen

A visitor survey showed that the Lake Stage audience's origin is the following: 63 % Germany, 23 % Austria, 11 % Switzerland/Liechtenstein, 3 % other countries.^{(2019)}

The Bregenzer Festspiele has the following seating capacities:

- Lake Stage: 6,980
- Festspielhaus, Great Hall: 1,656
- Workshop Theatre: 1,563
- Lake Foyer: 168
- Lake Studio: 330
- Park Studio: 220
- Vorarlberger Landestheater: 502
- Kunsthaus Bregenz: 150
- Theater Kosmos: 166

This adds up to a total of 11,735 seats.

== See also ==
- List of contemporary amphitheatres
- List of opera festivals

== Photo gallery ==
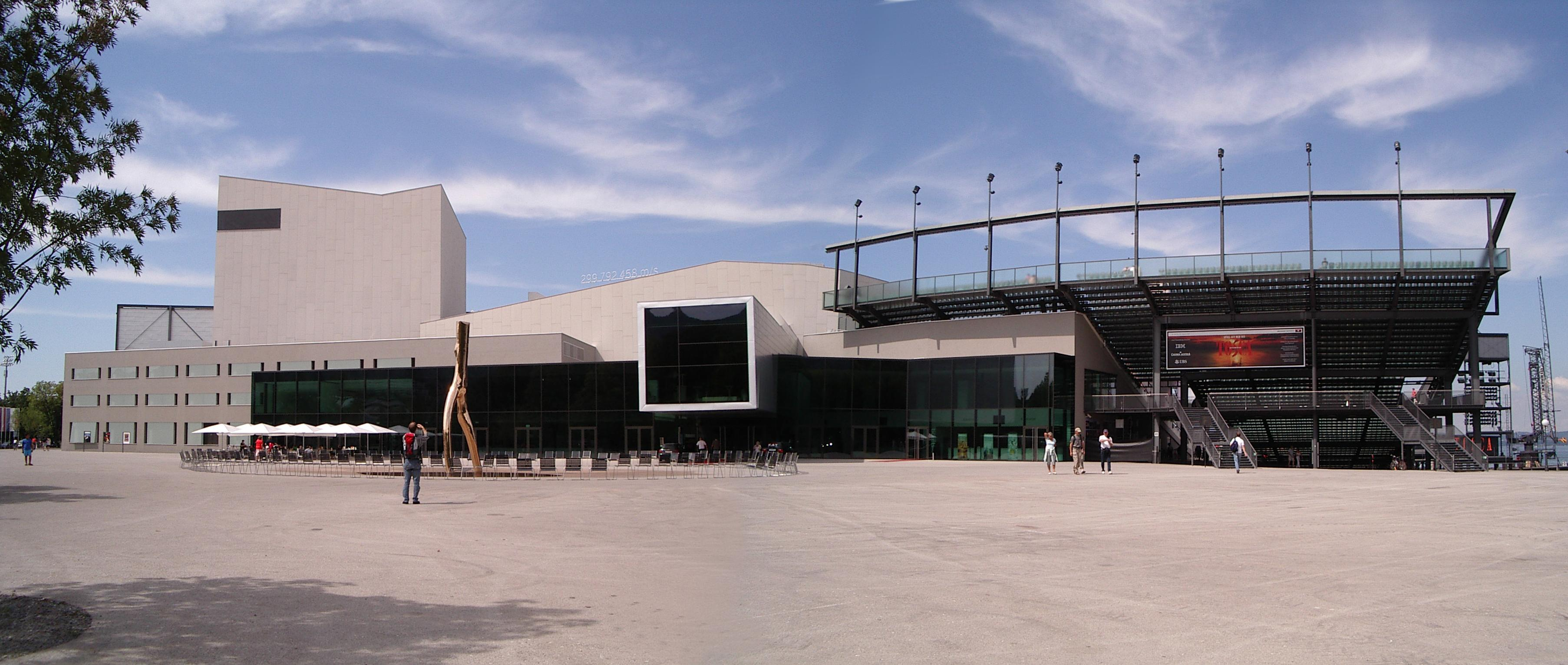
The Festspielhaus of the Bregenzer Festspiele

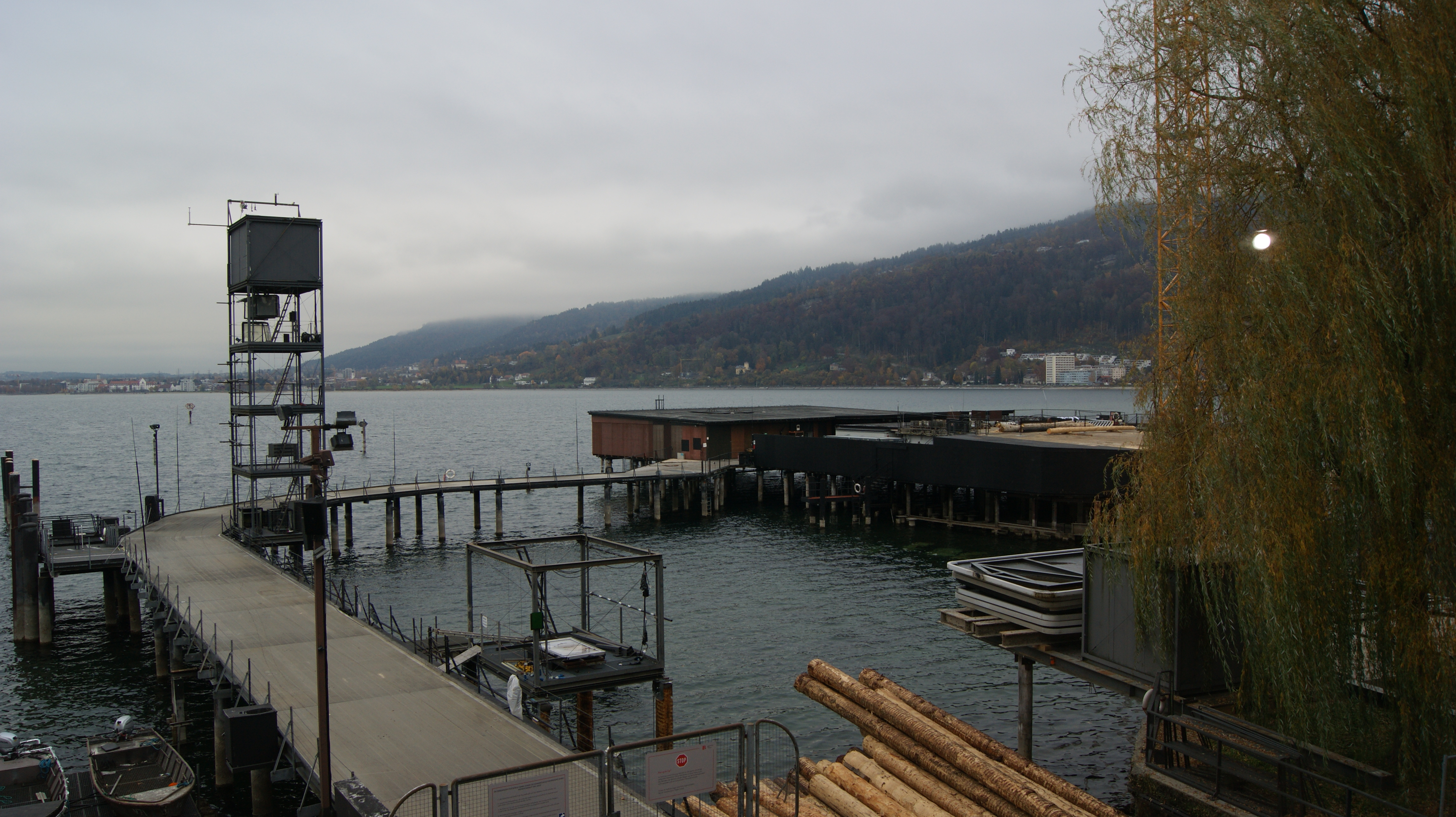
The floating stage in November 2018

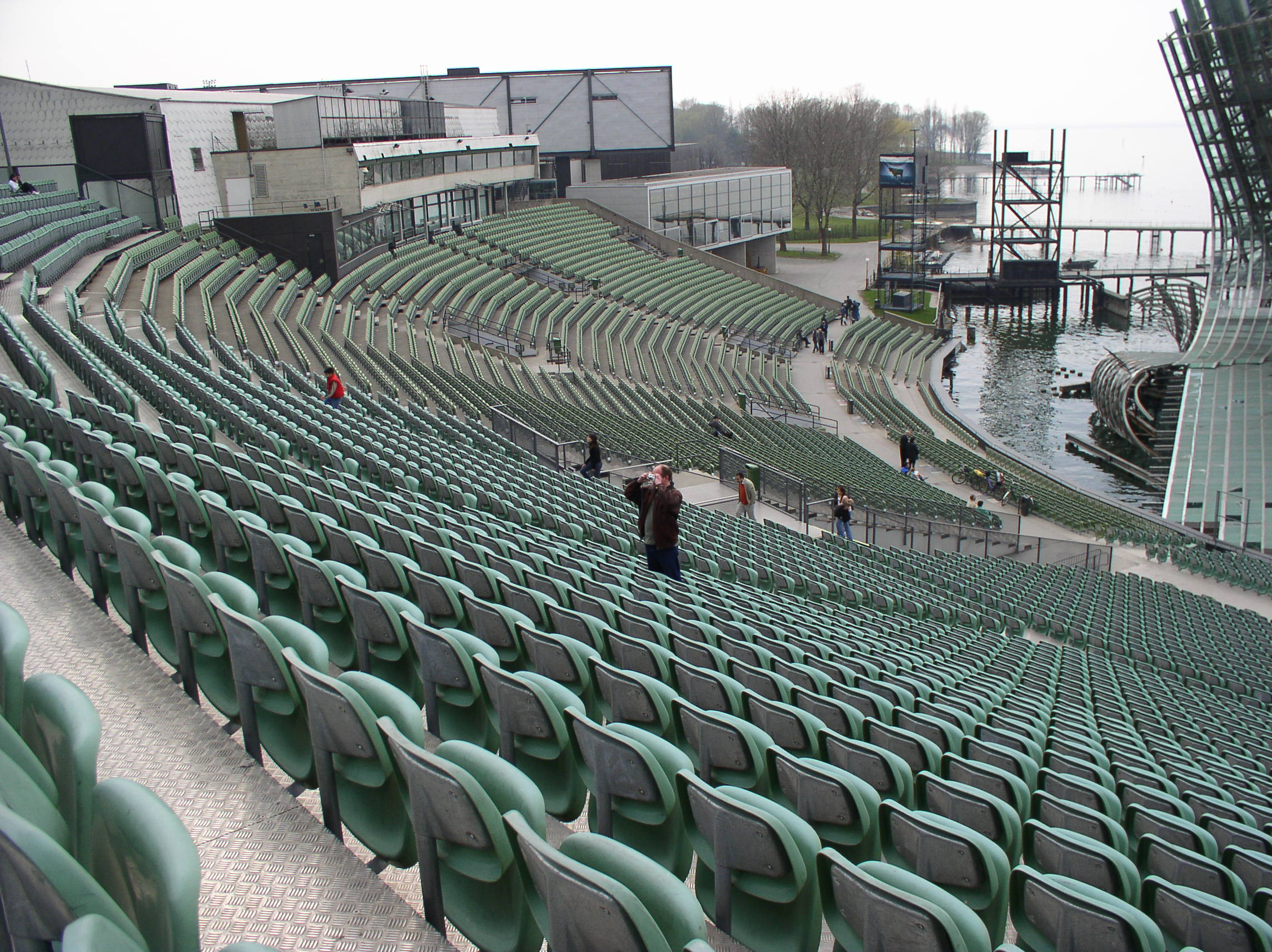
Seebühne (floating stage) stands for the 2003/2004 performances of West Side Story

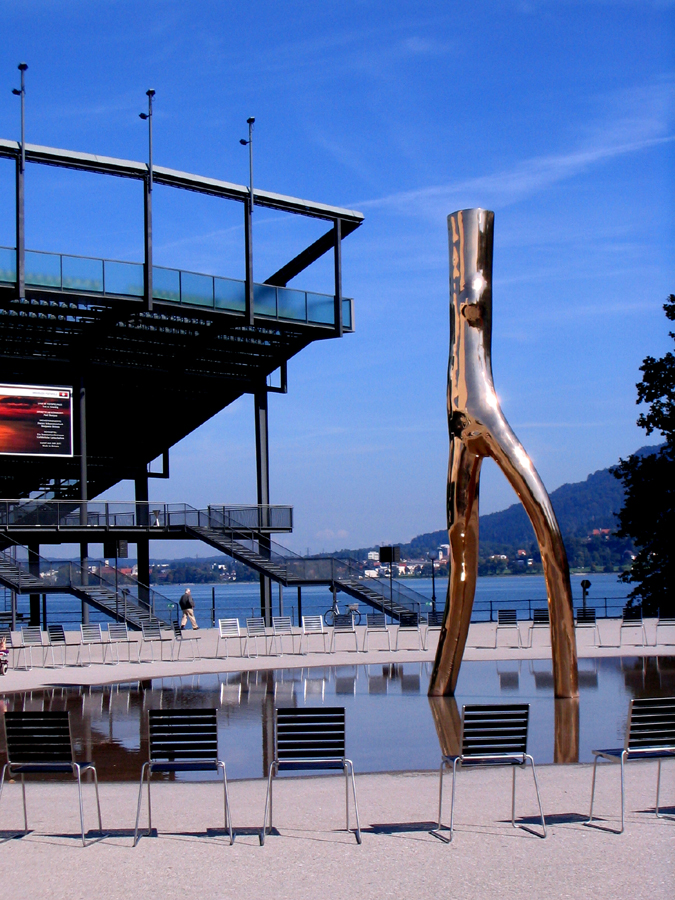
Sculpture "Ready Maid" at the Bregenzer Festspiele

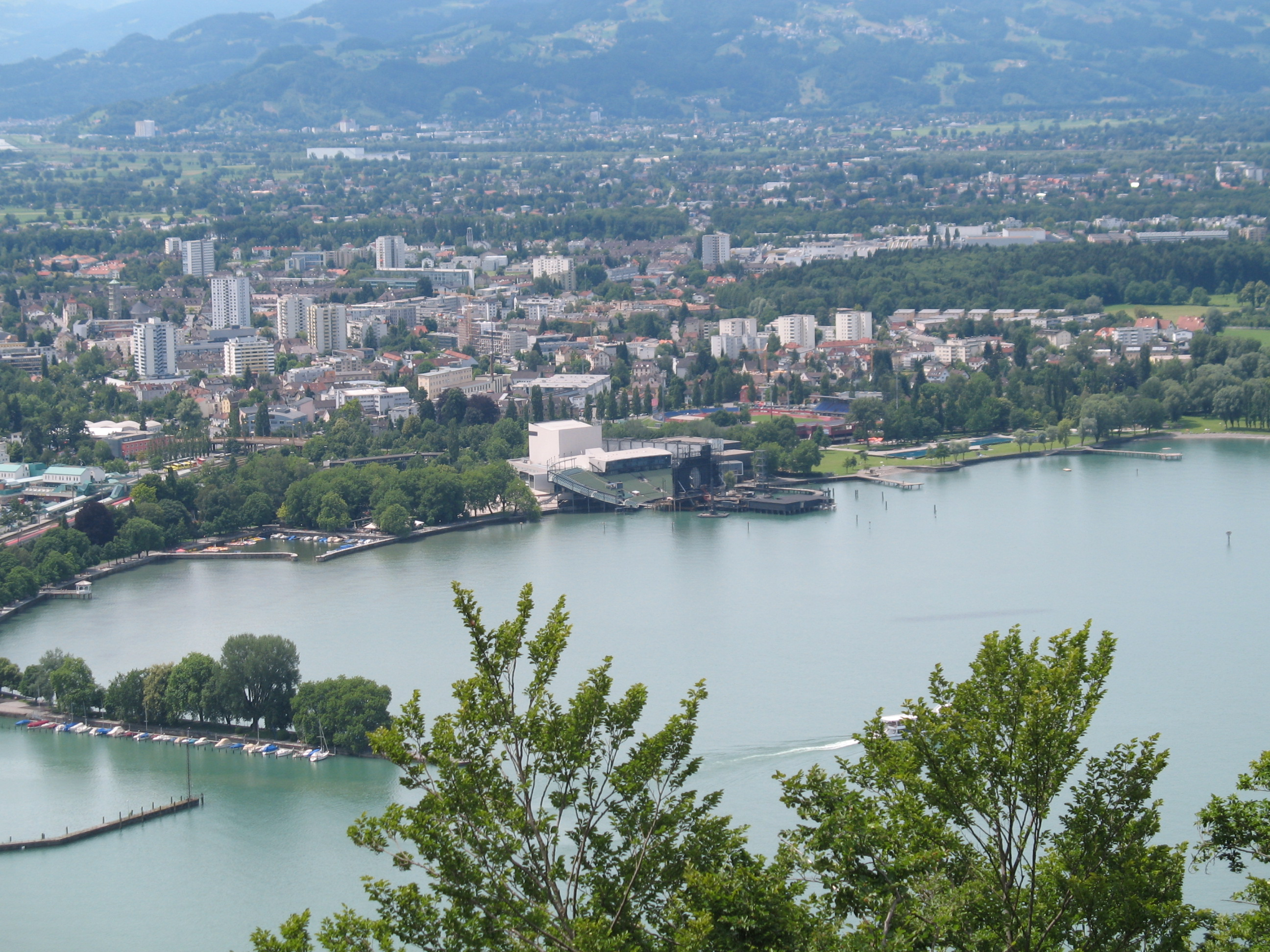
The floating stage from a distance

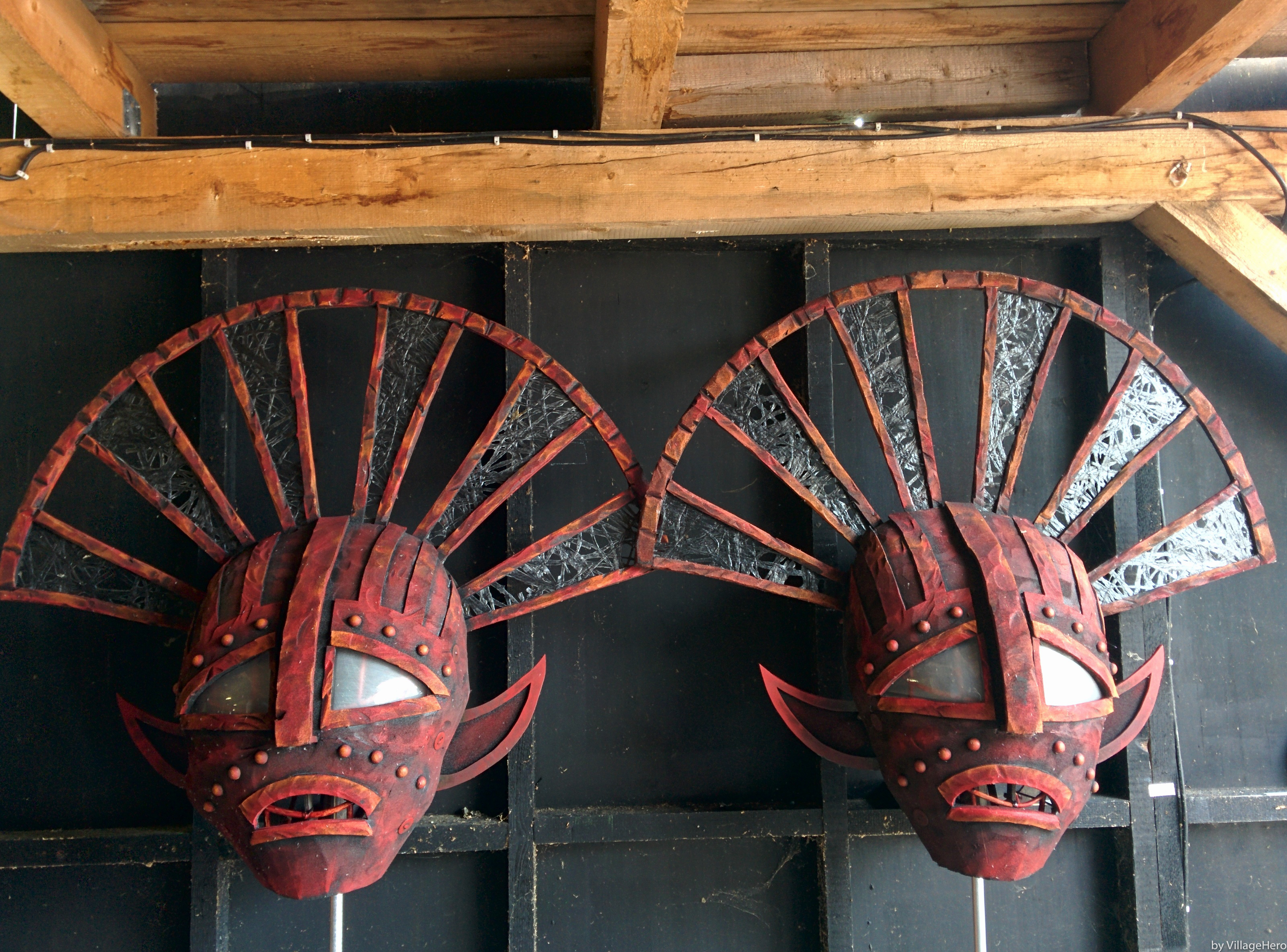
Two masks from the performance of Zauberflöte at the Bregenz Festival 2014

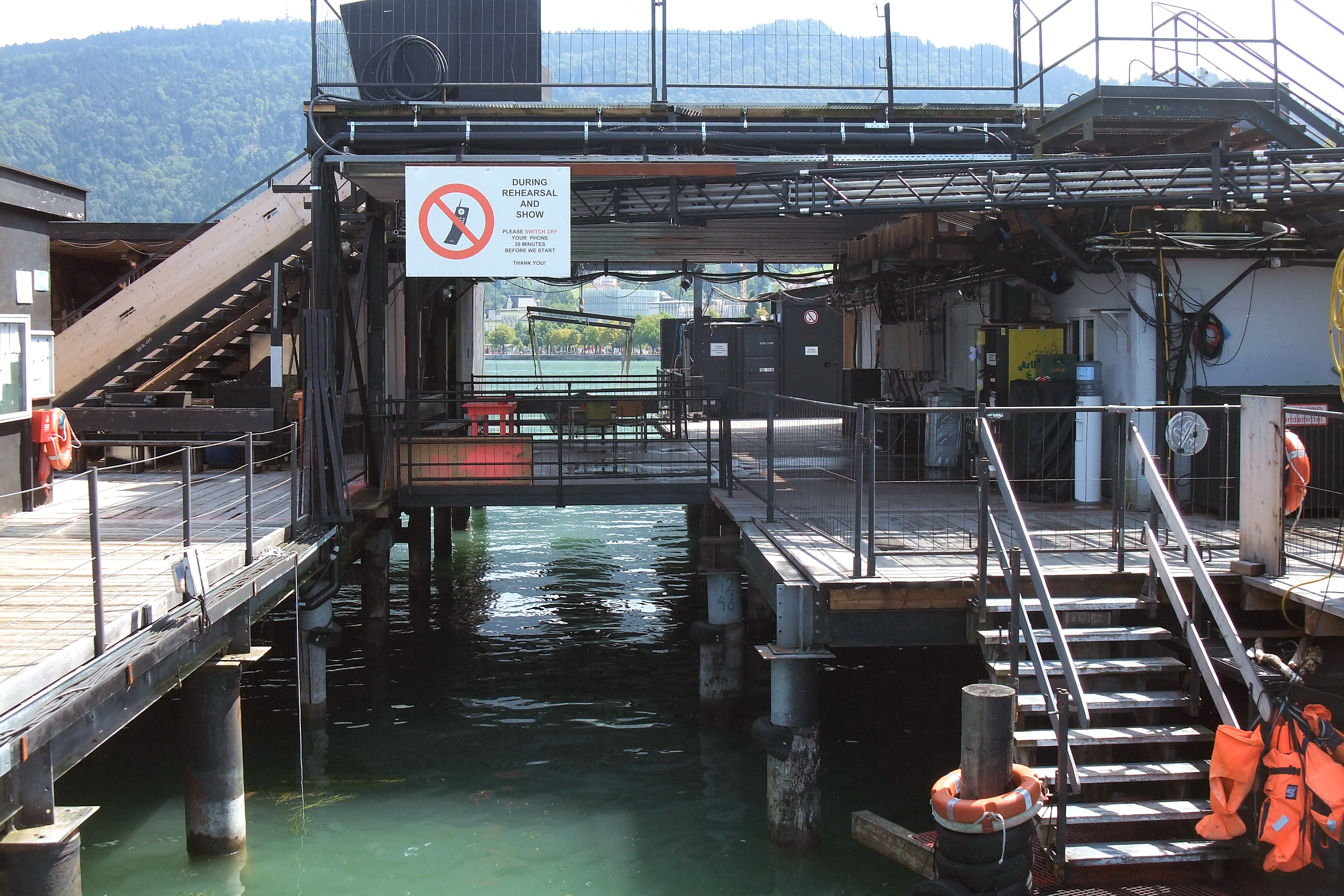
Backstage area of the floating stage

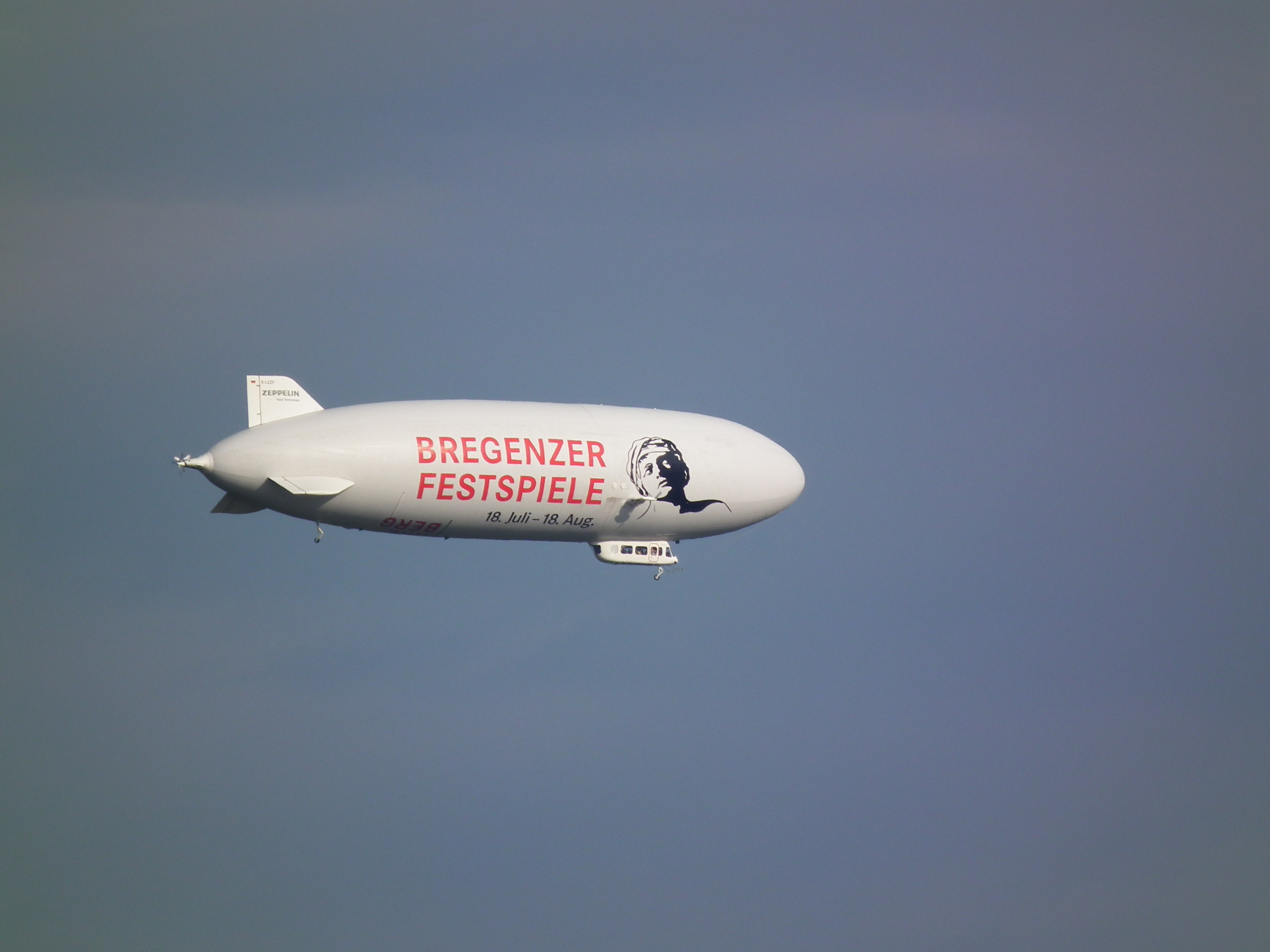
Bregenzer Festspiele zeppelin in May 2012

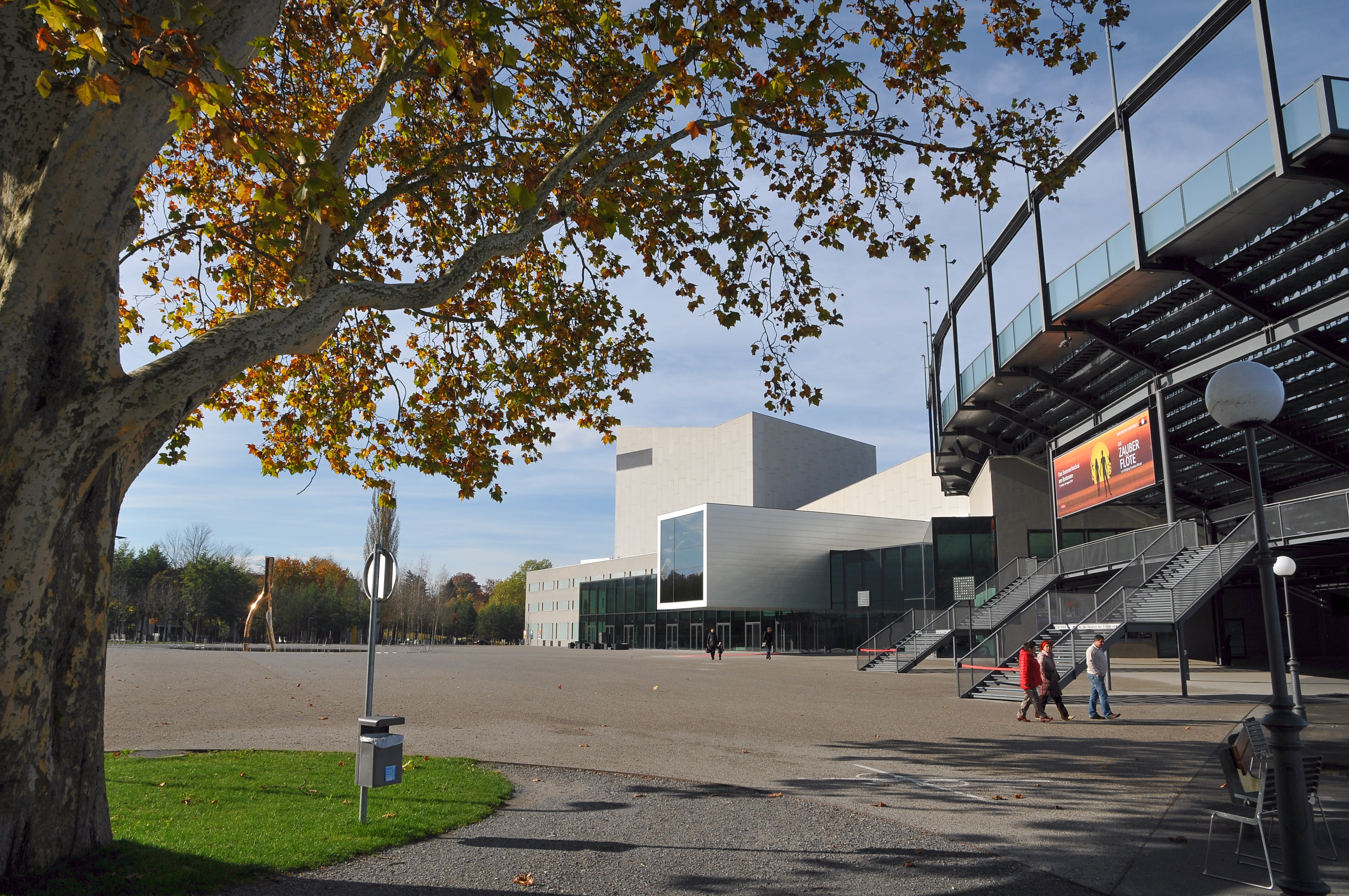
The Festspielhaus

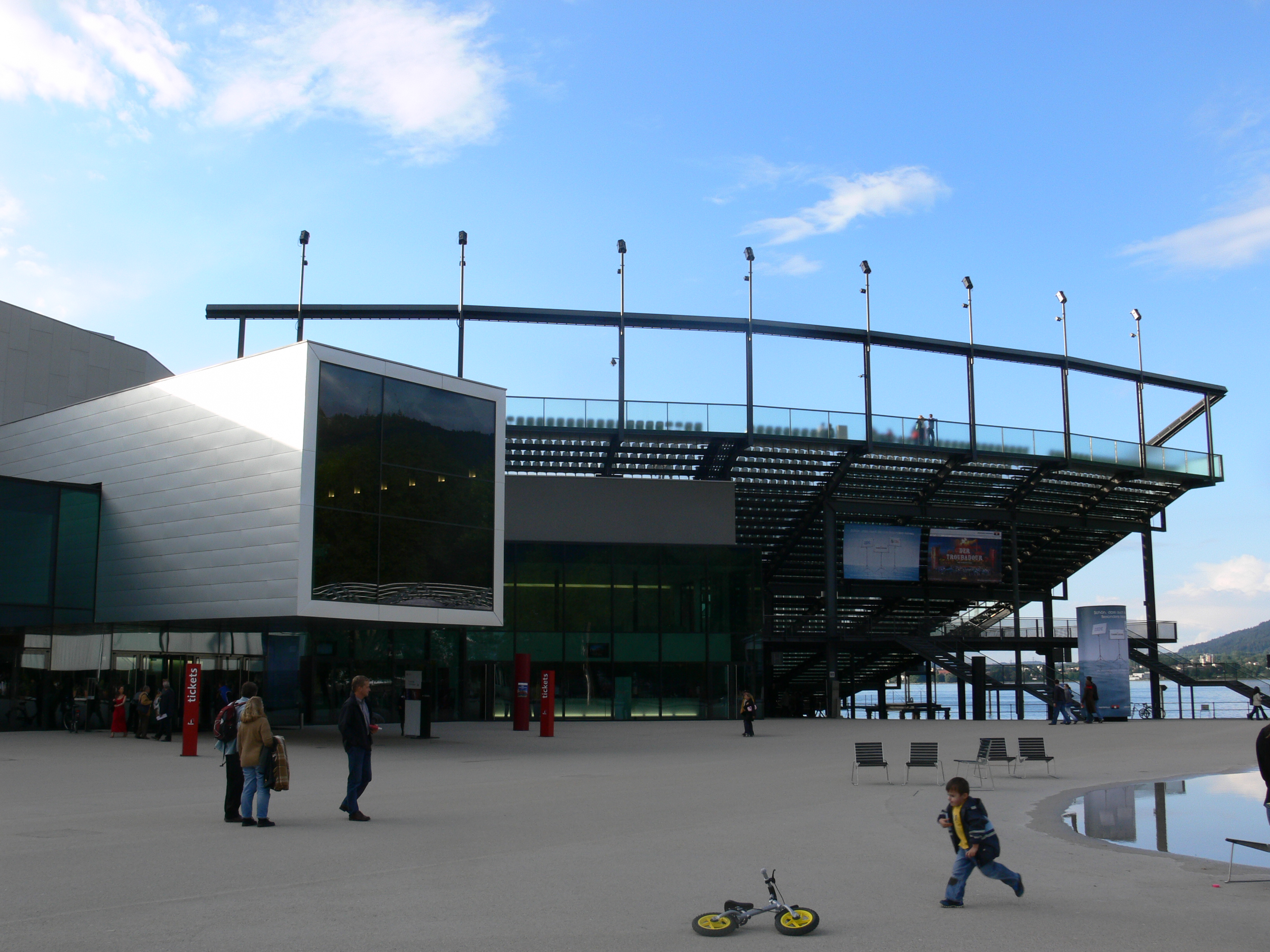
The Festspielhaus

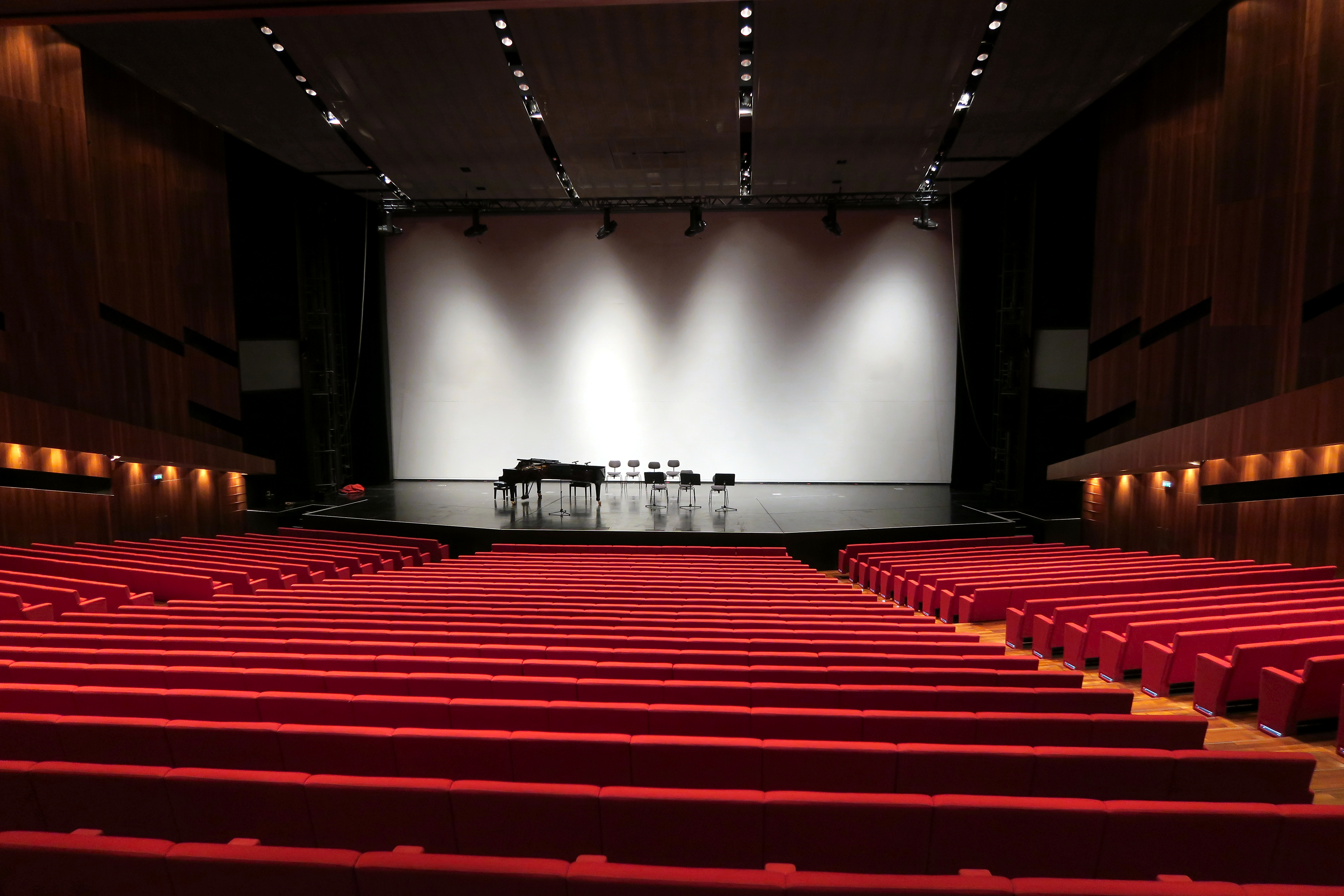
Inside the Festspielhaus
