= Zeitoper =

Zeitoper (German: [ˈtsaɪtʔoːpɐ], 'opera of the time') was a short-lived genre of opera associated with Weimar Germany. It is not known when or by whom the term was coined, but by 1928 Kurt Weill ("Zeitoper" in Melos) was able to complain that it was more a slogan than a description. Like opera buffa it used contemporary settings and characters, comic or at least satiric plots (Max Brand's Maschinist Hopkins is a sole tragic example) and aimed at musical accessibility. Two distinguishing characteristics are a tendency to incorporate modern technology (Jonny spielt auf: trains, Der Lindberghflug: airplanes, Von heute auf morgen: telephones, and even elevators) and frequent allusions to popular music, especially jazz. This last, more than any social satire, earned the suspicion of the political right and ensured that it would not survive into the Nazi era.

Ernst Krenek's Jonny spielt auf (1927) is held up as the epitome of the genre. Other composers are Paul Hindemith (Hin und zurück, 1927, Neues vom Tage, 1929), Wilhelm Grosz (Achtung! Aufname! to a libretto by Béla Balázs), plus Weill's Der Zar lässt sich photographieren (1928) and Die Bürgschaft (1932). The first Zeitoper to be composed was probably Intermezzo (1924) by Richard Strauss.

At the possible instigation of Krenek, the American George Antheil also wrote a Zeitoper for Frankfurt, Transatlantic (1930, originally titled Glare). In Von heute auf morgen (1930) Arnold Schoenberg attempted to have the last word on the fashion: at the end a child enters and asks the reconciled parents "What are modern people?" who respond with "That changes from one day to the next."
