= Der Protagonist =

- Literaturoper by Kurt Weill
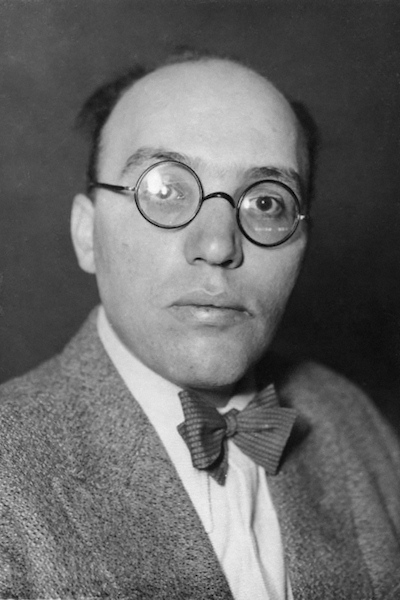
- The composer in 1932
- Librettist: Georg Kaiser
- Language: German
- Premiere: 27 March 1926; Semperoper, Dresden

Der Protagonist (The Protagonist) is an opera in one act by Kurt Weill, his Op. 15. The German libretto was written by Georg Kaiser based on his own play of the same name of (1920). Weill's first surviving opera has been described as Literaturoper.

== Performance history ==
It was first performed on 27 March 1926 at the Semperoper in Dresden, when it was directed by Josef Gielen and conducted by Fritz Busch. It was given again at the Städtische Oper Berlin in October 1928 directed by Walter Brügmann and conducted by Robert F. Denzler, this time as a double bill with Der Zar lässt sich photographieren.

Post-war performances have included productions at the Deutsche Oper am Rhein, Düsseldorf, in April 1958 (the first German post-war performance), directed by Friedrich Wilhelm Andreas and conducted by Friedrich Brenn; Santa Fe Opera from 31 July 1993, directed by Jonathan Eaton and conducted by George Manahan (coupled with Der Zar lässt sich photographieren). An Austrian premiere of the opera took place only on 17 November 2000 in a production of the University of Music and Performing Arts Vienna at Schönbrunn Palace, directed by Sebastian Müller and conducted by Marino Formenti. It was followed by the Bregenz Festival from 21 July 2004, with the direction of Nicolas Brieger and conducted by Yakov Kreizberg (coupled with Weill's Royal Palace).

== Roles ==
Roles, voice types, premiere cast
Role	Voice type	Premiere cast, 27 March 1926 Conductor: Fritz Busch
The protagonist	tenor	Curt Taucher
His sister	soprano	Elisa Stünzner
First actor	bass	Robert Büssel
Second actor	baritone	Rudolf Schmalnauer
Third actor	contralto	Elfriede Haberkorn
The majordomo of the duke	tenor	Ludwig Eybisch
Young lord	baritone	Paul Schöffler
Innkeeper	bass	Adolf Schoepflin
Eight musicians

== Recordings ==
Weill: Der Protagonist – Berlin German Symphony Orchestra

- Conductor: John Mauceri
- Principal singers: Corby Welch, Matthias Koch, Alexander Marco-Buhrmester, Robert Worle, Jan Buchwald, Matteo de Monti, Johannes von Duisburg, Amanda Halgrimson
- Recording date: 1 May 2002
- Label: Capriccio – 60 086 (CD)
