= Our Nell =

- Written by: Louis N. Parker; Reginald Arkell
- Original language: English
- Genre: Period musical
- Setting: London, 17th Century

Premiere
- Date premiered: 16 April 1924
- Place premiered: Gaiety Theatre, London

Our Nell is a musical with a book by Louis N. Parker and Reginald Arkell and music by Harold Fraser-Simson and Ivor Novello. It is based on the life of the English actress Nell Gwynn, mistress of Charles II. It was inspired by an earlier musical Our Peg by Edward Knoblock, that premiered in 1919 based on the life of the eighteenth century actress Peg Woffington.

Our Nell premiered in April 1924 and ran for 140 performances at the Gaiety Theatre in London's West End with a cast that included Arthur Wontner, Walter Passmore, Miles Malleson, Reginald Bach, Amy Augarde and José Collins in the title role.

== Bibliography ==
- Wearing, J. P. The London Stage 1920–1929: A Calendar of Productions, Performers, and Personnel. Rowman & Littlefield, 2014.
