= Der Kuhhandel =

- Operetta by Kurt Weill
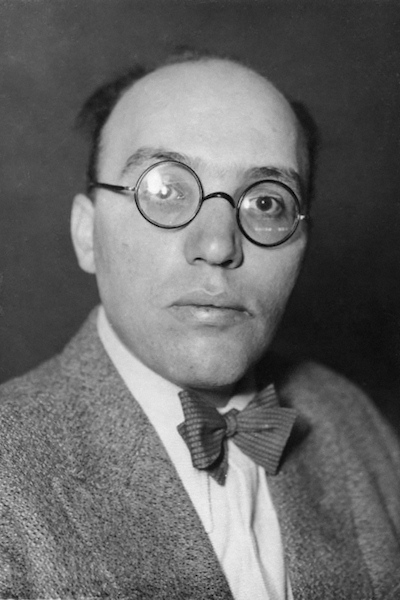
- The composer in 1932
- Translation: A Kingdom for a Cow
- Librettist: Robert Vambery
- Language: German
- Premiere: 28 June 1935 (in English); Savoy Theatre, London

Der Kuhhandel (A Kingdom for a Cow or Arms and the Cow) is an operetta by Kurt Weill. The German libretto was written by Robert Vambery.

== Genesis ==
Kurt Weill and Robert Vambery were both refugees from Nazi Germany. They met in Paris in 1933 and began work on the operetta in 1934. Following the completion of the libretto, attempts to interest theatre managers in Paris and Zürich in staging the operetta proved abortive, and Weill turned to other projects, leaving most of the musical numbers complete but unorchestrated.

The German word Kuhhandel means "cattle trading". In German slang of the 1930s it referred to shady manoeuvrings by politicians – "horse trading" in English or American usage.

== Performances and versions ==
In early 1935, Weill and Vambery collaborated with Reginald Arkell (book) and Desmond Carter (lyrics) on a three-act English-language musical comedy version of the operetta called A Kingdom for a Cow. This premiered on 28 June 1935 at the Savoy Theatre, London, under the baton of Muir Mathieson and starring the popular young tenor Webster Booth. It achieved a critical success but failed at the box-office, running for only two weeks.

In 1978, Lys Symonette, Weill's friend and assistant, prepared a reconstruction of the original two-act operetta, and this was published by Schott Musik in 1981. This version was first performed in concert in Düsseldorf on 22 March 1990 (conductor: Jan Latham Koenig) and on stage at the Deutsch-Sorbisches Volkstheater, Bautzen (conductor: Dieter Kempe, director Wolfgang Poch) in 1994.

The United States premiere, in an English-language version by Jeremy Sams, took place on 11 April 2000 at the Juilliard School (conductor, Randall Behr, director Frank Corsaro). The first performance in Britain of the Symonette version was given by Opera North on 30 March 2006, at the Alhambra Theatre, Bradford. The conductor was Jim Holmes and the director was David Pountney, who also collaborated with Sams on a revised translation. This production was first seen (in German) at the Kornmarkttheater, Bregenz, on 13 August 2004.

== Roles ==
=== 1935 London Cast ===
Source: The Stage.

- Juanita – Jacqueline Francell
- Juan – Webster Booth
- Leslie Jones – George Gee
- P. W. Waterkyn – Edward Dalby
- Ximenez – Hay Petrie
- President – Aubrey Mather
- Bimbi – Henry Hepworth
- General Garcia Conchas – Bobbie Comber
- School Master – Wilfred Caithness
- Mother – Vivienne Chatterton
- Bailiff – Norman Williams
- Footman – Ben Pullen
- Ucquan Minister – Cecil Brooking
- Lieutenant – Herbert Garry
- Madam Odette – Joan Hay

=== Symonette version ===
Role	Voice type	Premiere Cast, concert version 22 March 1990 (Conductor: Jan Latham Koenig)
Juan Santos	tenor	Eberhard Büchner
Juanita Sanchez	soprano	Lucy Peacock
President Mendez	tenor	Walter Raffeiner
Leslie Jones	baritone	Christian Schotenröhr
Ximenes	tenor	Udo Holdorf
General Garcia Conchaz	baritone	Osker Hillebrandt
Juan's mother	soprano	Ingebord Most
Madame Odette	soprano	Renate Zimmermann

== Synopsis ==
Place: The fictional country of Santa Maria, which shares a Caribbean island with another state, Ucqua.

=== Act 1 ===
Juan owns a cow, whose milk generates enough money to enable him to marry his sweetheart, Juanita, who has no dowry. Meanwhile, the peace-loving President Mendez and his advisor Ximenes are approached by Jones, an American arms dealer, who fabricates reports that Ucqua is re-arming and persuades them to buy weapons from him.

As Santa Maria is short of money, Mendez and Ximenez introduce a new tax to pay for the weapons. Juan cannot pay, his cow is impounded and the wedding with Juanita is called off. Juan works as a stevedore to earn enough money to get the cow back, but a second attempt at a wedding is again foiled by the impounding of the cow. This is because a second tax has had to be imposed at the behest of the war-mongering General Conchas, who plans manoeuvres on the border with Ucqua. Juan is called up into the army, and, to earn money for a replacement cow, Juanita goes into the city to work as a prostitute at Madame Odette's establishment. Jones and Ximenes conspire to replace Mendez as president by Conchas, who organises a putsch and takes power.

=== Act 2 ===
Conchas visits Madame Odette's to celebrate his takeover and is captivated by Juanita. Next day, despite a hangover, he takes part in a military parade organised by Ximenes. Juan, who has no desire to be a soldier, punches the General and is sentenced to death. Luckily, the guns that Jones has sold to Santa Maria fail to go off, whereupon it turns out that the guns that he has also sold to Ucqua are also defective. President Conchas opts for peaceful coexistence with Ucqua and pardons Juan, who can now reclaim his cow with the help of his army pay and Juanita's earnings, and at last the couple can get married.

== The music ==
Musically, Der Kuhhandel is closer to the bitter-sweet German works (e.g. The Threepenny Opera, Rise and Fall of the City of Mahagonny) that Weill was leaving behind him than to the Broadway operas like Knickerbocker Holiday, One Touch of Venus and Love Life that were to follow. An important influence, however, and one not common to either group, is the music of Offenbach: Weill described the piece as "an operetta influenced by Offenbach".

== Recordings ==
- (CD) Excerpts, conducted by Jan Latham Koenig, Eberhard Büchner, Lucy Peacock, Christian Schotenröhr, Walter Raffeiner, Oskar Hillebrandt, Cologne Radio Symphony Orchestra and chorus; Capriccio 60 013-1 (1990).
- (DVD) Complete, conducted by Christoph Eberle: Ursula Pfitzner, Dietmar Kirschbaum, Michael Kraus, Vienna Volksoper, directed by David Pountney; Phoenix 803 (2007).

== Sources ==
- Filler, Susan (2011). "Jewish Nationalism in Opera". Studia Musicologica. 52 (1/4): 499–506. JSTOR 43289777. (subscription required)
- Schebera, Jürgen (1995). Kurt Weill: An Illustrated Life. New Haven: Yale University Press. ISBN 978-0-30-006055-3.
