= Reginald Arkell =

English writer (1881–1959)

- Arkell in 1956.
- Born: 14 October 1881; Lechlade, Gloucestershire, England
- Died: 1 May 1959 (aged 77); Cricklade, England
- Occupations: Script writer and comic novelist

Reginald Arkell (14 October 1881 – 1 May 1959) was a British script writer and comic novelist who wrote many musical plays for the London theatre. The most popular of those was an adaptation of the spoof history book 1066 and All That: 1066—and all that: A Musical Comedy based on that Memorable History by Sellar and Yeatman. He was the author of A Cottage in the Country and the Green Fingers series of garden verse.

Arkell was born on 14 October 1881 at Lechlade, Gloucestershire, England, was educated at Burford Grammar School and trained as a journalist. He married actress Elizabeth Evans in 1912. During the First World War he served with the King's Own Yorkshire Light Infantry and The Norfolk Regiment. He also scripted a propaganda comic book, Bosch the soldier, illustrated by Alfred Leete. Arkell died on 1 May 1959 at Cricklade, England.

== Works ==
- The Round House (1958, novel)
- Charley Moon (1953, novel, published by Michael Joseph Ltd)
- "Trumpets Over Merriford" (1955, American title: The Miracle Of Merriford, 1956, novel)
- Collected Green Fingers (1956, poems)
- Come to the ball; or, Harlequin (1951, adaptation of Johann Strauss II's Die Fledermaus)
- Old Herbaceous (1950, republished 2002)
- Green fingers Again (1942, poems)
- War Rumours (1939, verse, illustrated by Edgar Norfield)
- Percy Ponsonby (1939, TV series)
- 1066 And All That (1939, TV version)
- The Street Singer or Interval for Romance (1937, film musical which starred Arthur Tracy)
- Smash and Grab (1937, film)
- Green fingers, and other poems (1934, includes Roses at Owlpen)
- The Last Waltz (1936, film of the musical comedy)
- 1066 And All That (1935, revue)
- A Kingdom for a Cow (1935, adaptation of Kurt Weill's operetta Der Kuhhandel)
- Playing the Games (1935, humour)
- Bridge Without Sighs (1934, A Harmless Handbook to the game, written in rhyme)
- Richard Jefferies (1933, biography)
- Winter Sportings (1929)
- Meet These People (1928, poetry with caricatures by Bert Thomas, published by Herbert Jenkins)
- Columbine – A Fantasy of Summertime (1928, adaptation for radio)
- The Blue Train (1927, musical, music by Robert Stolz, additional lyrics by Ivy St. Helier)
- Frasquita (1925, operetta, music by Franz Lehár)
- Our Nell (1924, musical play, music by Ivor Novello and Harold Fraser-Simson)
- The tragedy of Mr. Punch (1923, play)
- Columbine (1922, play)
- Catherine (1922, musical play, music by Tchaikovsky)
- The Last Waltz (1922, musical comedy, music by Oscar Straus)
- All the Rumors (1916, contains the poem Actual Evidence I Have None ..., published by Duckworth & Company, 1916
- World War, 1914-1918 (47 pp.)
- Colombine: A Fantasy : and Other Verse, 1912
- "The Holidays" (Children's poem in The Captain, December 1910)

== Old Herbaceous ==
Old Herbaceous is a British novel centered on a garden and its title character, Bert Pinnegar. An orphan child born near the end of the Victorian era who has one leg longer than the other, Pinnegar moves from picking wildflowers as a schoolboy to becoming the head gardener known as "Old Herbaceous." In this role, he serves as a county flower-show judge and cultivates greenhouse strawberries in April along with morning glories requested by his Lady.

Old Herbaceous is a novel about a head gardener at a British country house.
