= Der Zar lässt sich photographieren =

Opera-buffa by Kurt Weill

- Opera buffa by Kurt Weill
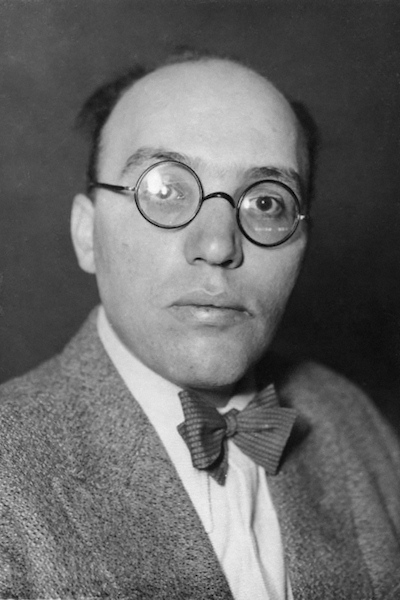
- Weill, in 1932
- Description: Zeitoper
- Translation: The Tsar Has his Photograph Taken
- Librettist: Georg Kaiser
- Language: German
- Premiere: 18 February 1928; Neues Theater, Leipzig

Der Zar lässt sich photographieren (The Tsar Has his Photograph Taken.') is an opera buffa in one act by Kurt Weill, op. 21. The German libretto was written by Georg Kaiser, and Weill composed the music in 1927. It is a Zeitoper, a genre of music theatre which used contemporary settings and characters, satiric plots which often include technology and machinery. Musically the Zeitoper genre tends to be eclectic and borrow from Jazz. The genre has practically disappeared from the world's opera houses. Historically the Zeitoper came to an abrupt end with the Nazi period, and after the war the cultural institutions were perhaps hesitant to return to the lighter, often decadent and comic operas written before the holocaust changed the artistic perspective. This conjecture is supported by the statistical fact that of all of Weill's, Schönberg's, Hindemith's and Krenek's works – it is these very shorter, satirical Zeitoper works that are no longer performed.

== Composition and performance history ==
In early March 1927, the German Chamber Music Festival in Baden-Baden contacted Weill about having a piece ready for that July; he presented this idea to Kaiser. It quickly became clear that this piece would be too large for that festival (both in length and in the size of the orchestra it would require); Weill would eventually bring the Mahagonny-Songspiel there instead. The libretto was complete by 20 April, and Weill finished composing on 4 August. The lyrics sung by the men's chorus, commenting on the action, were Weill's own addition to Kaiser's libretto.

The opera was first performed at the Neues Theater in Leipzig on 18 February 1928. Weill had intended it to be a companion piece for Der Protagonist, though it was staged at its premiere with Niccola Spinelli's A basso porto (1894). Der Zar lässt sich photographieren and Der Protagonist were then performed together at Altenburg on 25 March of the same year and were, Weill noted, surprisingly well received: "thirteen curtains for Protagonist and fifteen for Zar". In Germany Zar soon because Weill's most popular work after Dreigroschenoper and remained so until his music was banned as decadent. Plans for its performance in the Soviet Union fell through for ideological reasons – above all, said an adviser for Moscow State Opera, because the hero "adopts no firm political stance".

According to Berkowitz, the Nazis suppressed the opera because "The plot deliberately revolves around what a European audience would have assumed were a set of really stock Jewish characters, not only a pioneering woman photographer, who were nearly all Jewish then, but also a group of anarchist terrorists."

The first American performance took place on 27 October 1949, at the Juilliard School, New York. Weill, now a composer on Broadway, said of it, "I'm sorry I wrote that sort of thing." The first professional performance in America was at The Santa Fe Opera in August 1993, with George Manahan conducting. The first performance in the United Kingdom was at the Bloomsbury Theatre, London on 12 March 1986. It was performed at the Guildhall in London, 1997 (producers Stephen Medcalf and Martin Lloyd-Evans, conductor Clive Timms), and the Stockholm Royal Opera, 2000 (conductors Dmitri Slobodeniouk and David Searle, producer Knut Hendriksen).

A new translation by Leo Doulton, with research by Michael Berkowitz, professor of Jewish history at UCL, is reported to cast new light on the reasons for the work's suppression by Nazi Germany and to set the opera in its proper context. The Tsar Wants His Photograph Taken, directed by Doulton, was scheduled for a single performance on 4 May 2019, also at the Bloomsbury Theatre. The Scottish premiere, performed by Scottish Opera Young Company, took place in Glasgow in July 2021.

== Roles ==
Role	Voice type	Premiere Cast, 18 February 1928 (Conductor: Gustav Brecher)
The Tsar	baritone	Theodor Horand
Angèle	soprano	Ilse Koegel
The false Angèle	soprano	Maria Janowska
The assistant	tenor	
The boy	contralto	
The leader of the gang	mezzo-soprano or tenor	
The false assistant	tenor	
The false boy	contralto	
The equerry	bass	

== Synopsis ==
Place: a photographic studio in Paris

Time: 1914

An offstage male chorus chants the opera's title (and comments on the action from time to time). Angèle (the proprietress) and her male assistants, one of them a boy, have little work to do, but a telephone-call brings news that the Tsar wishes to have his photograph taken. A large box-camera is set up, but, before the Tsar arrives, four members of a gang of revolutionaries burst in. They bind and gag Angèle and her staff. Three of the gang dress up as Angèle, her assistant and the boy, and the leader of the gang, proclaiming that the revolution is imminent, conceals a gun in the camera. It will fire at the Tsar when the bulb used for taking the photograph is squeezed. The captives are put in another room, the leader hides, and the Tsar is announced.

The Tsar is dressed in a summer suit and accompanied only by an equerry. He wants an informal portrait rather than an official one. He is attracted by the False Angèle and asks to be left alone with her. She is keen to take the photograph (i.e. to "shoot" him), but he flirts with her and offers to take her photograph first. She manages to avoid being accidentally shot by the Tsar, and is finally about to press the bulb to shoot him when the equerry re-appears to report that the police have followed some assassins to the studio. The false Angèle, realising that the game is up, puts on a seductive gramophone record (the "Tango Angèle") and asks the Tsar to avert his eyes while she undresses. She and the rest of the gang escape through the window just before the police arrive with the real Angèle and her assistants, who had previously themselves escaped and raised the alarm. The gun is removed from the camera, and the Tsar, though dismayed that the real Angèle is not as attractive as the false one, finally, as the chorus again says, "has his photograph taken".

== Music ==
The opera's music is continuous, rather than arranged in "numbers" as were all subsequent theater pieces by Weill. There are big orchestral climaxes at dramatic moments but also some popular-music forms, such as the foxtrot which accompanies the entrance of the Tsar. The "Tango Angèle" was specially recorded for the first performance, and is one of the earliest examples of pre-recorded music being used on stage in a dramatic work. It was Weill's first best-selling recording. The recording was made available to other productions of the opera as part of the package including the score.

== Recordings ==
- Barry McDaniel, Marita Napier, Carla Pohl, Cologne Radio Symphony Orchestra and Chorus, conductor Jan Latham-König (Capriccio 60007–1)

In Italian: Angela Kalmus, Edda Vincenzi, Fernanda Cadoni, Amedeo Berdini, Petre Monteanu. Mario Carlin, Marcello Cortis, Ugo Trama, Antonio Pietrini, Adelio Zagonara, Robert Amis El Hage. Coro e Orchestra della RAI di Roma, conductor Bruno Maderna (Cantus Classics CACD 5.01992)
