= Robert Vambery =

Theatre artistic director, scholar and composer (1907-1999)

Robert Vambery (5 December 1907 – 2 August 1999) was a theatre director, author and teacher, associated with the works of Kurt Weill.

== Life and career ==
Vambery was born in Budapest and educated in Germany. In 1927 Ernst Josef Aufricht engaged him as the literary director of the Theater am Schiffbauerdamm in Berlin. In that role he was involved in the first production of Bertolt Brecht and Kurt Weill's The Threepenny Opera, and made German versions of Donizetti's La Fille du régiment and Gilbert and Sullivan's The Pirates of Penzance.

Vambery left Germany in 1933 when the Nazis came to power. He moved to Paris, where he and Weill (a fellow exile) collaborated on an operetta, Der Kuhhandel (the cattle trade). The work was a failure when it premiered (in London) in 1935, but has since been successfully revived.

In 1938 Vambery moved to the United States. He taught in the drama department at Columbia University, where he was associated with the world premiere in 1941 of Paul Bunyan by Benjamin Britten and W. H. Auden. He contributed to publications including Die Weltbühne and The Nation.

=== Sources ===
- Drew, David (1990). "Reflections on the Last Years". In Kim H. Kowalke (ed.). New Orpheus: Essays on Kurt Weill. New Haven: Yale University Press. ISBN 978-0-30-003514-8.
- Schebera, Jürgen (1995). Kurt Weill: An Illustrated Life. New Haven: Yale University Press. ISBN 978-0-30-006055-3.
