= Royal Palace (opera) =

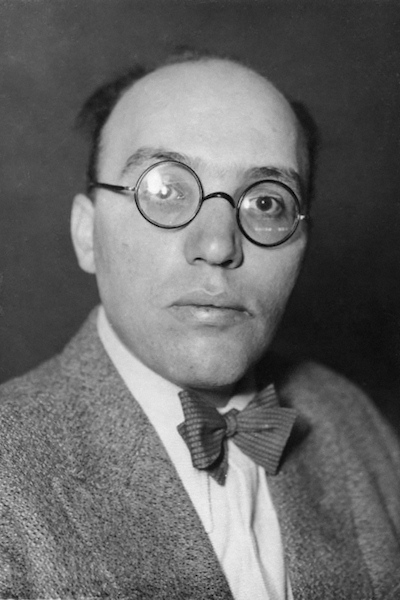
Photograph of Kurt Weill by Carl Van Vechten, 1932

Royal Palace is a 1925 one-act German-language ballet opera with a female choir in 13 scenes by Kurt Weill to a libretto by Yvan Goll. The premiere was on 2 March 1927 at the Berlin State Opera under the artistic direction of Erich Kleiber.

The orchestral score and thus the original instrumentation was lost during the Nazi era and was reconstructed in 1971 by Noam Sheriff and Gunther Schuller, as a dance drama from a piano reduction with notes on the orchestration.

== Cast ==
- Dejanira (dramatic soprano)
- The Husband (bass)
- Yesterday's Lover (baritone)
- Tomorrow's Lover (tenor)
- The Young Fisherman (tenor)
- The Old Fisherman (bass)
- Ladies Choir (backstage)
