= Puhja Parish =

Former municipality of Estonia

Coordinates: 58°20′30″N 26°18′52″E

Puhja Parish Puhja vald
- Former municipality of Estonia
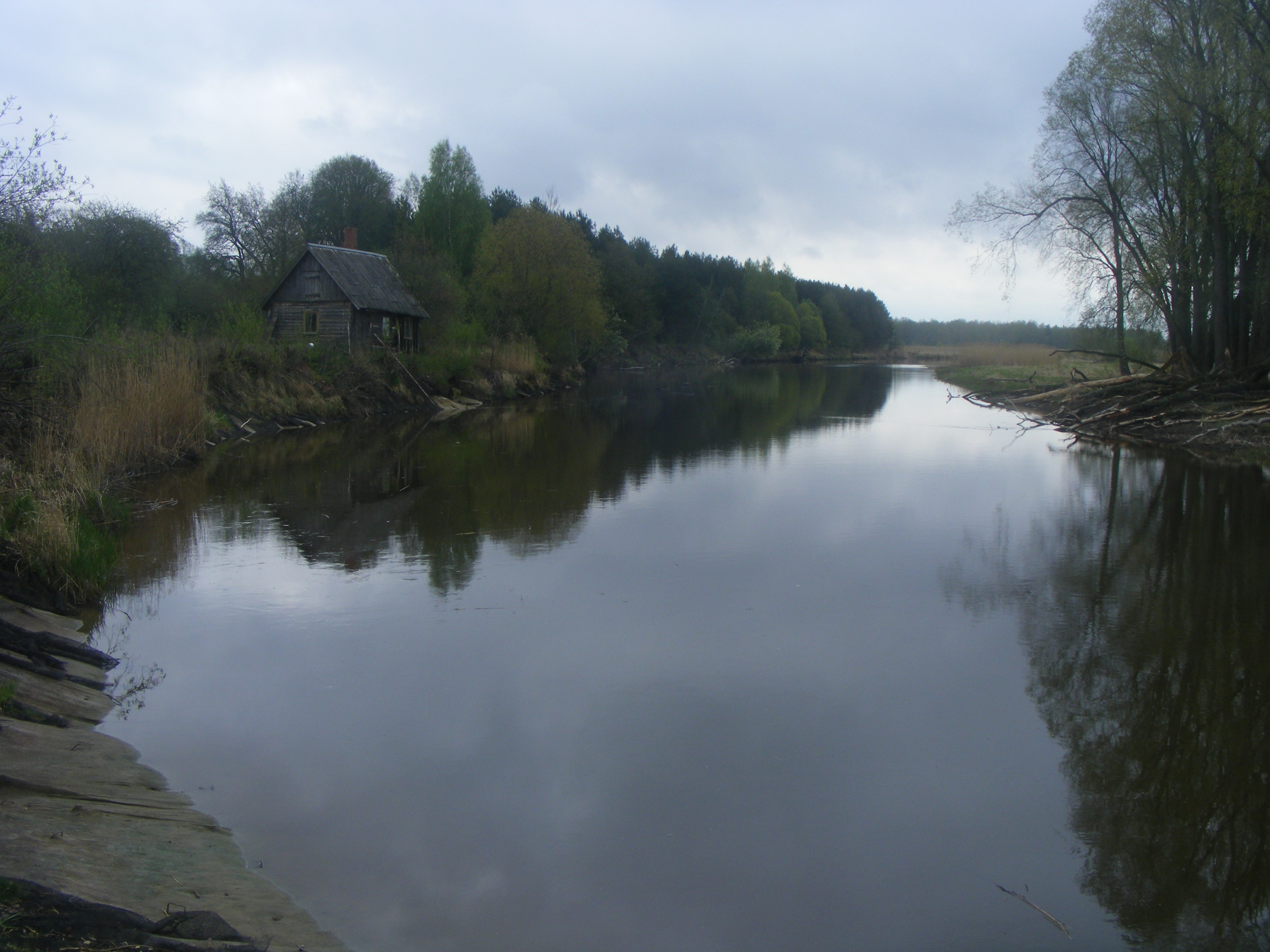

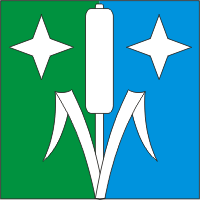
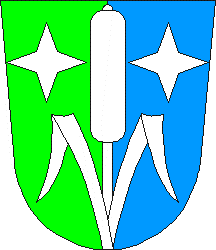
- Flag Coat of arms

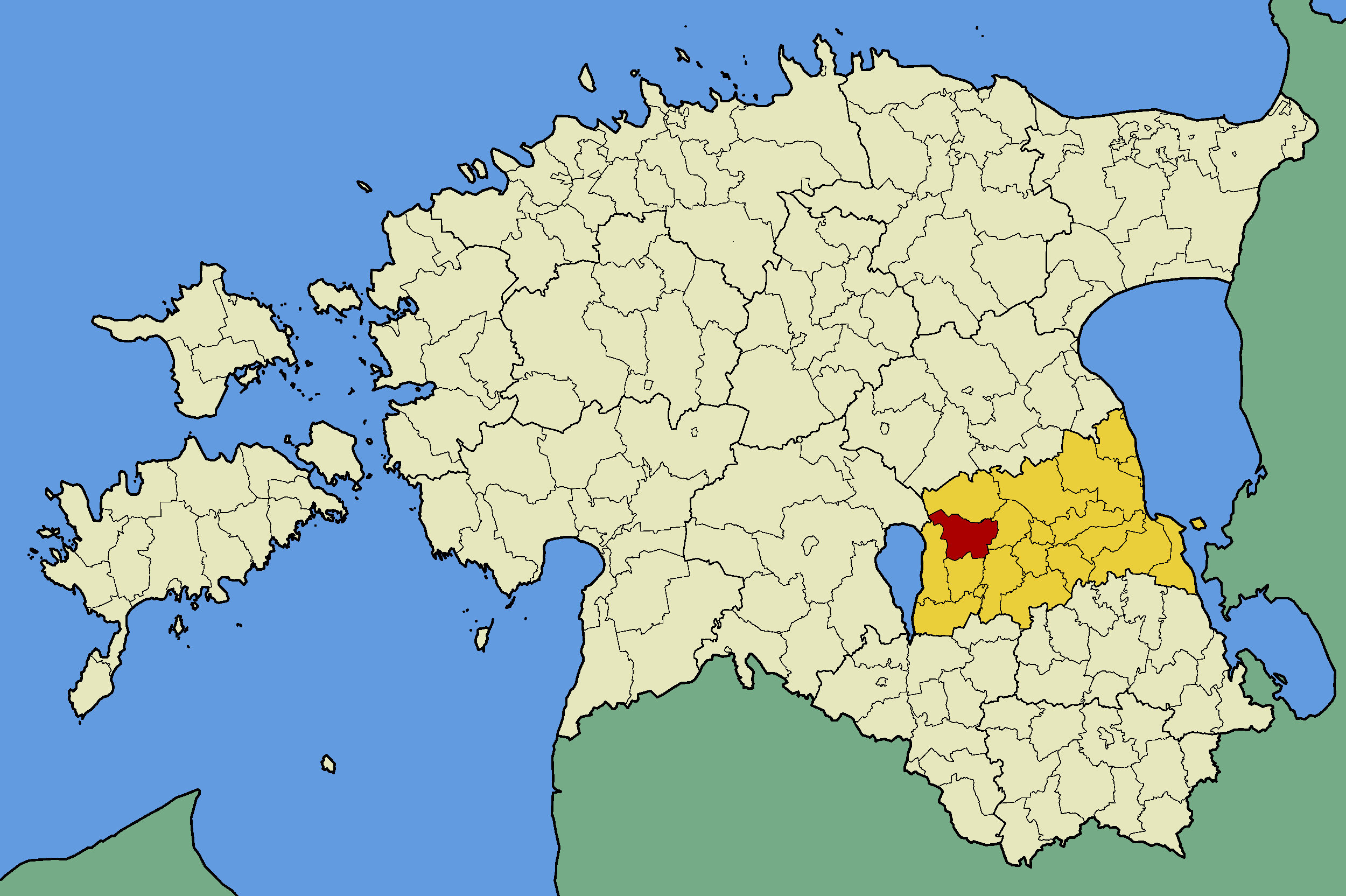
- Puhja Parish within Tartu County.
- Country: Estonia
- County: Tartu County
- Administrative centre: Puhja
- Website: www.puhja.ee

Puhja Parish was a rural municipality in Tartu County, Estonia.

== Settlements ==
Small boroughs
Puhja
Ulila

Villages
Härjanurme
Järvaküla
Kaimi
Kureküla
Mäeselja
Mõisanurme
Nasja
Palupõhja
Poriküla
Rämsi
Ridaküla
Saare
Tännassilma
Teilma
Vihavu
Võllinge
Võsivere

== Gallery ==
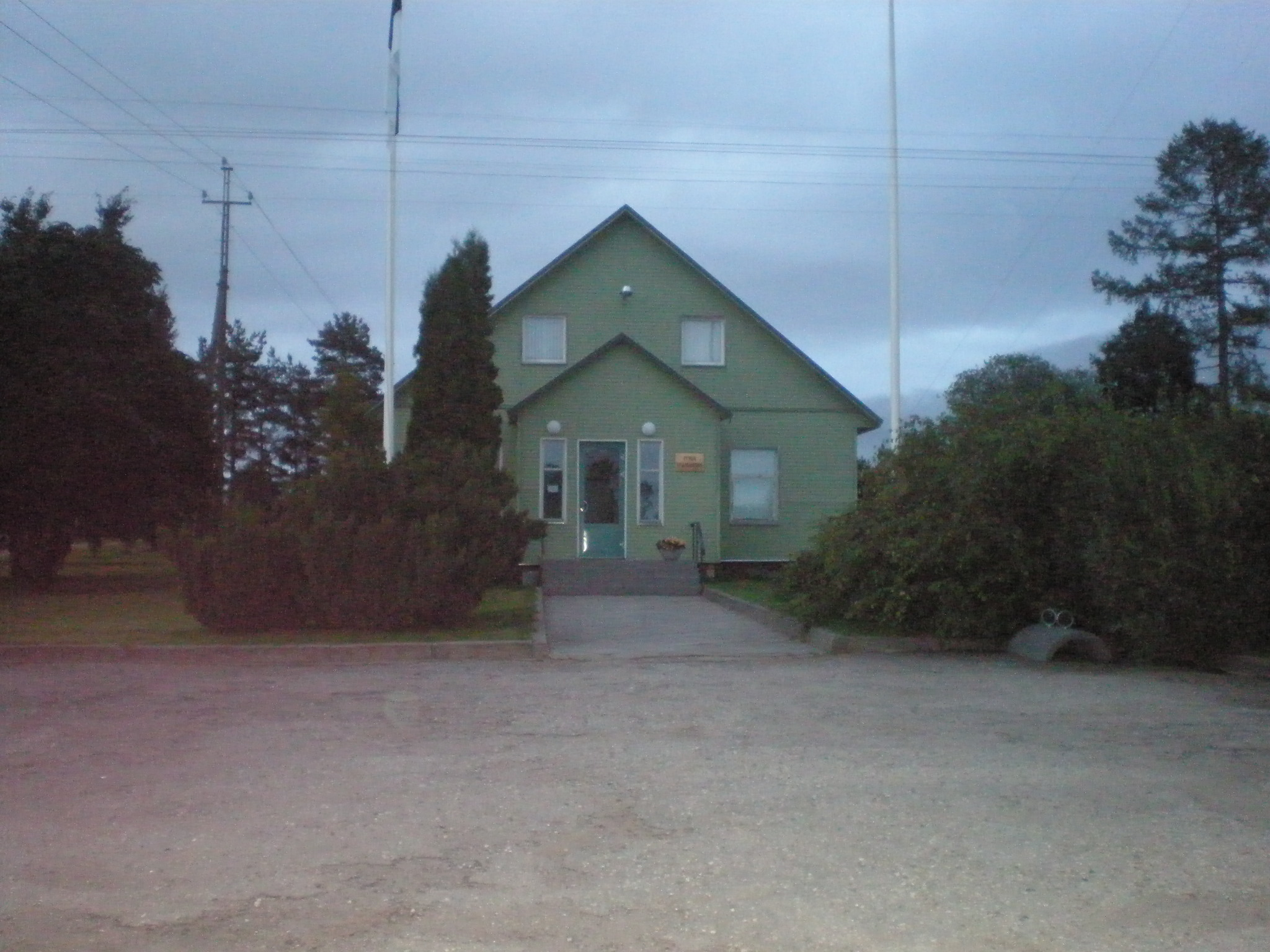
The local government building in Puhja.

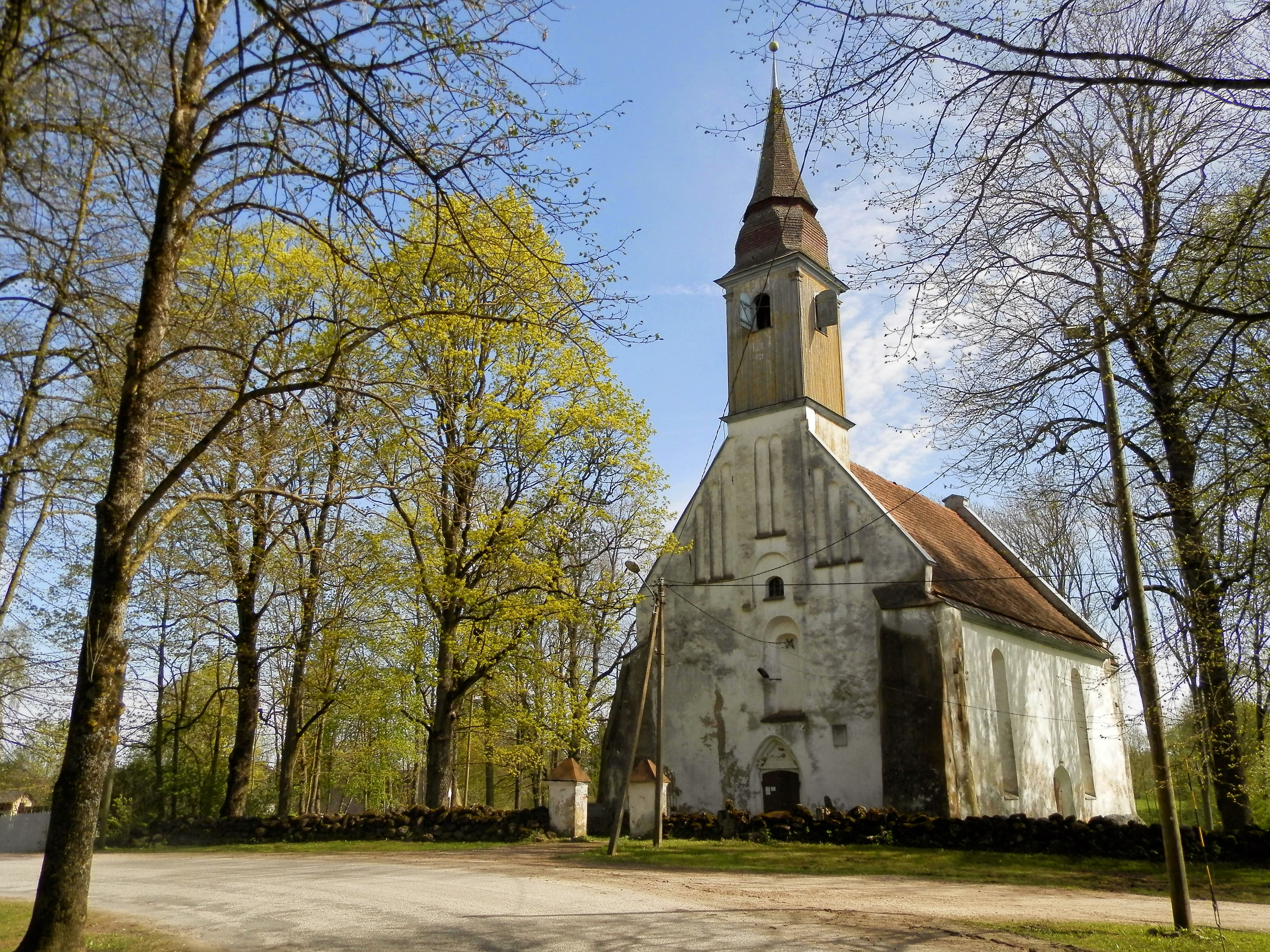
Puhja church (in Puhja), dating from the 14th century.

== Twinnings ==
- Kuhmoinen Municipality, Finland

== See also ==
- Kavilda stronghold
