= Rannu Parish =

Former municipality of Estonia

Coordinates: 58°14′N 26°13′E

Rannu Parish Rannu vald
- Former municipality of Estonia
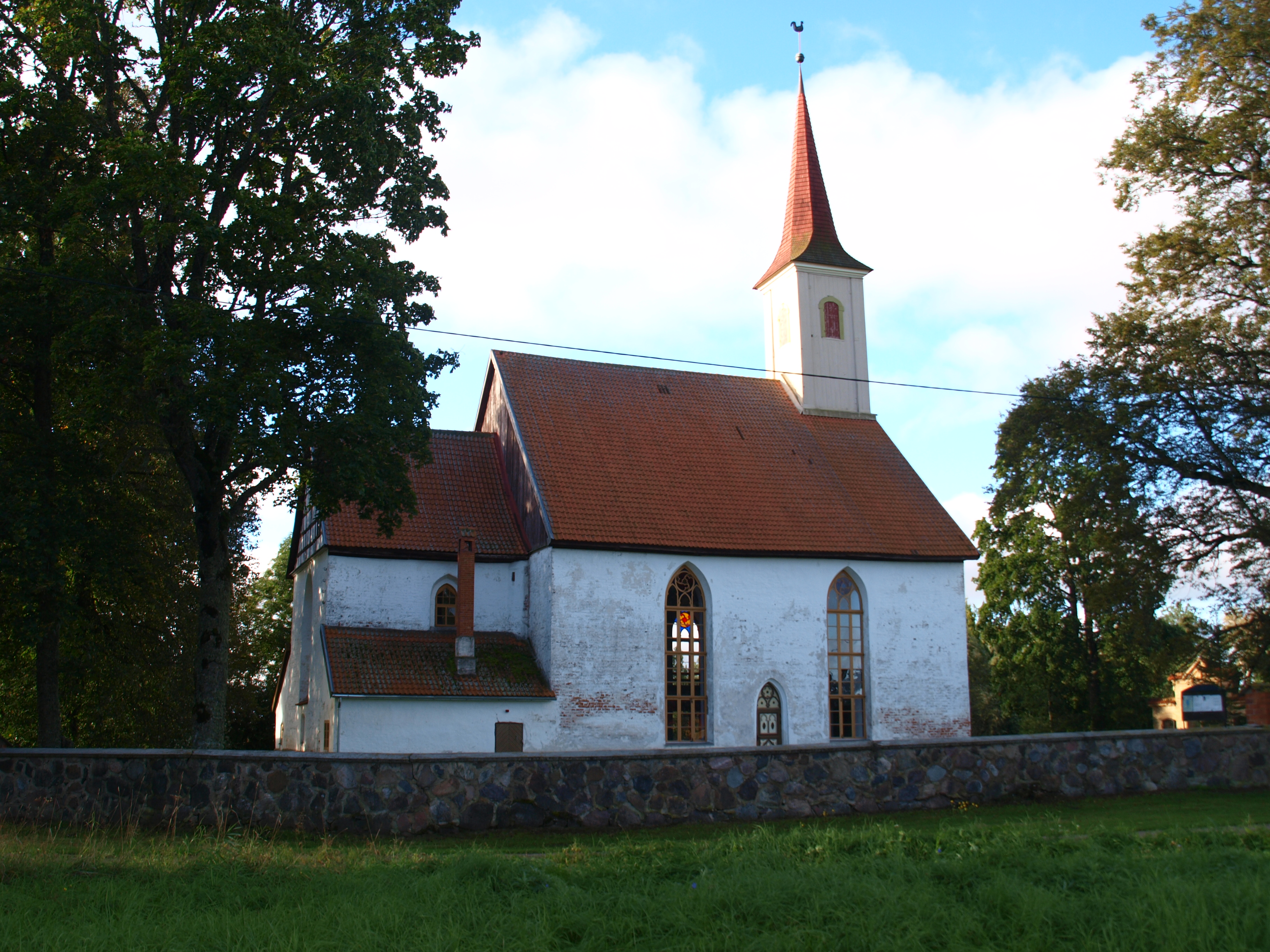
- Rannu church

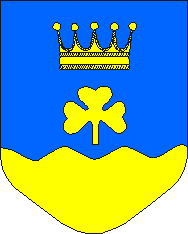
- Flag Coat of arms

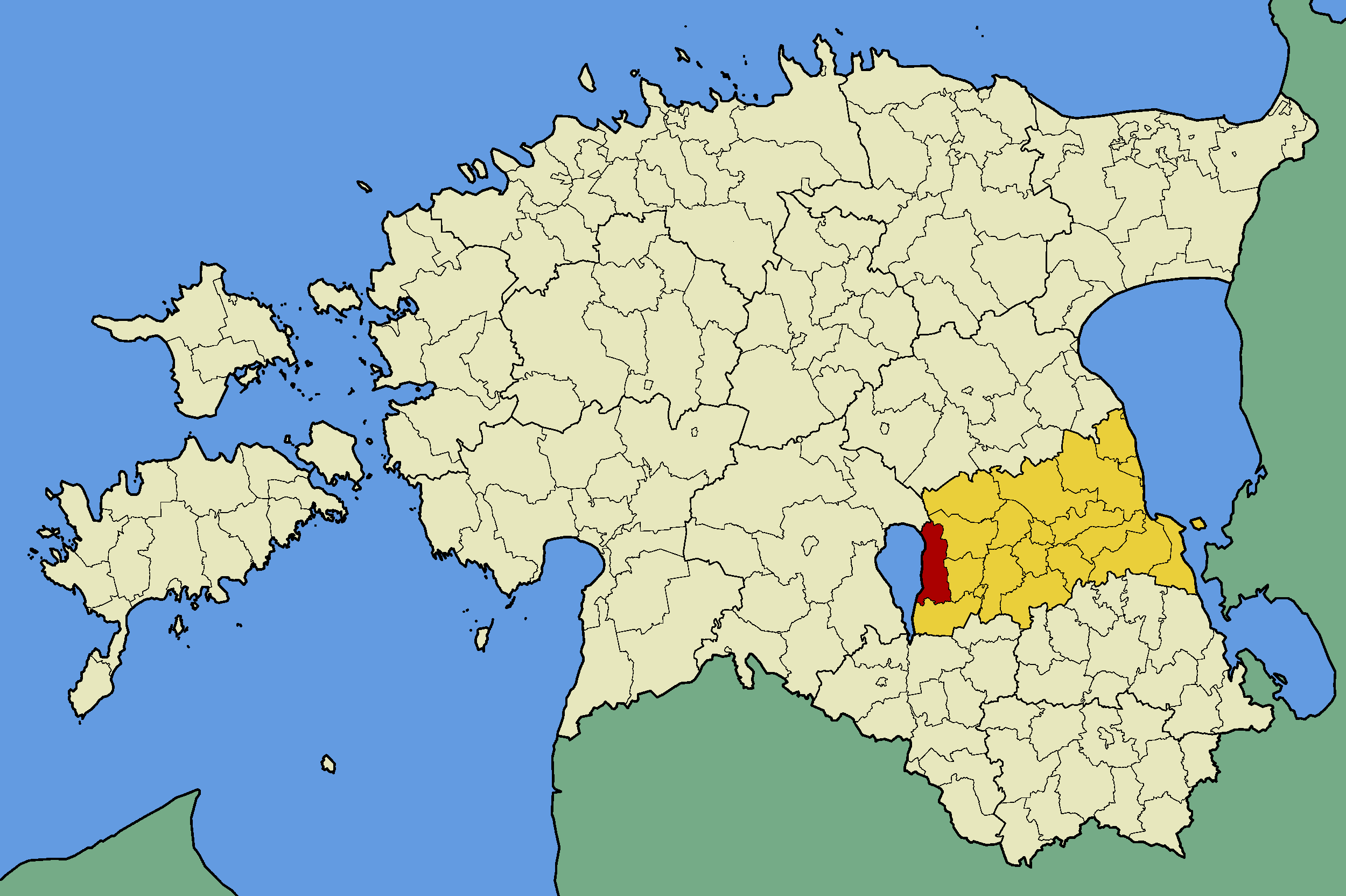
- Rannu Parish within Tartu County.
- Country: Estonia
- County: Tartu County
- Administrative centre: Vallapalu
- Website: www.rannu.ee

Rannu Parish was a rural municipality in Tartu County, Estonia. In 2017 it was merged into Elva Parish.

== Settlements ==
Small boroughs

Kureküla - Rannu

Villages

Ervu - Järveküla - Kaarlijärve - Kipastu - Koopsi - Kulli - Neemisküla - Noorma - Paju - Sangla - Suure-Rakke - Tamme - Utukolga - Vallapalu - Vehendi - Verevi - Väike-Rakke

== Gallery ==
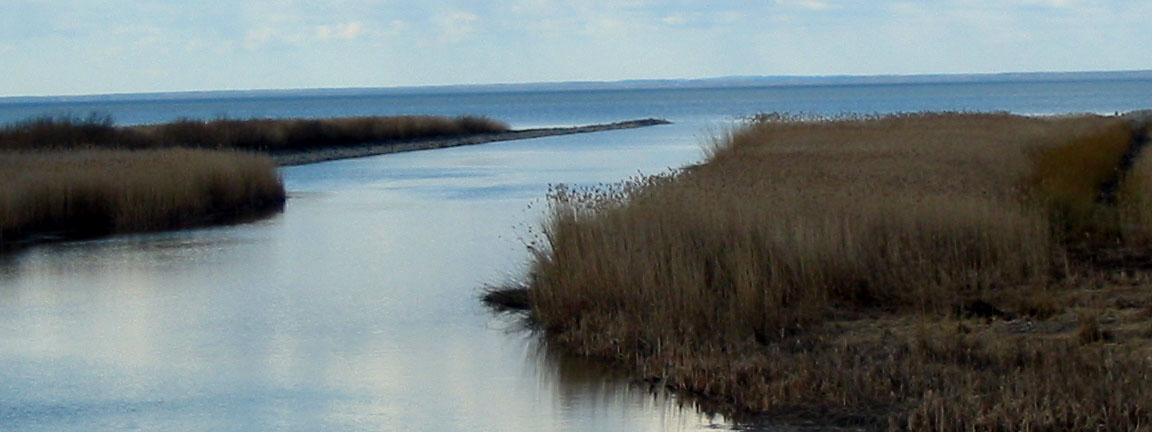
Lake Võrtsjärv drains into Emajõgi near Verevi.

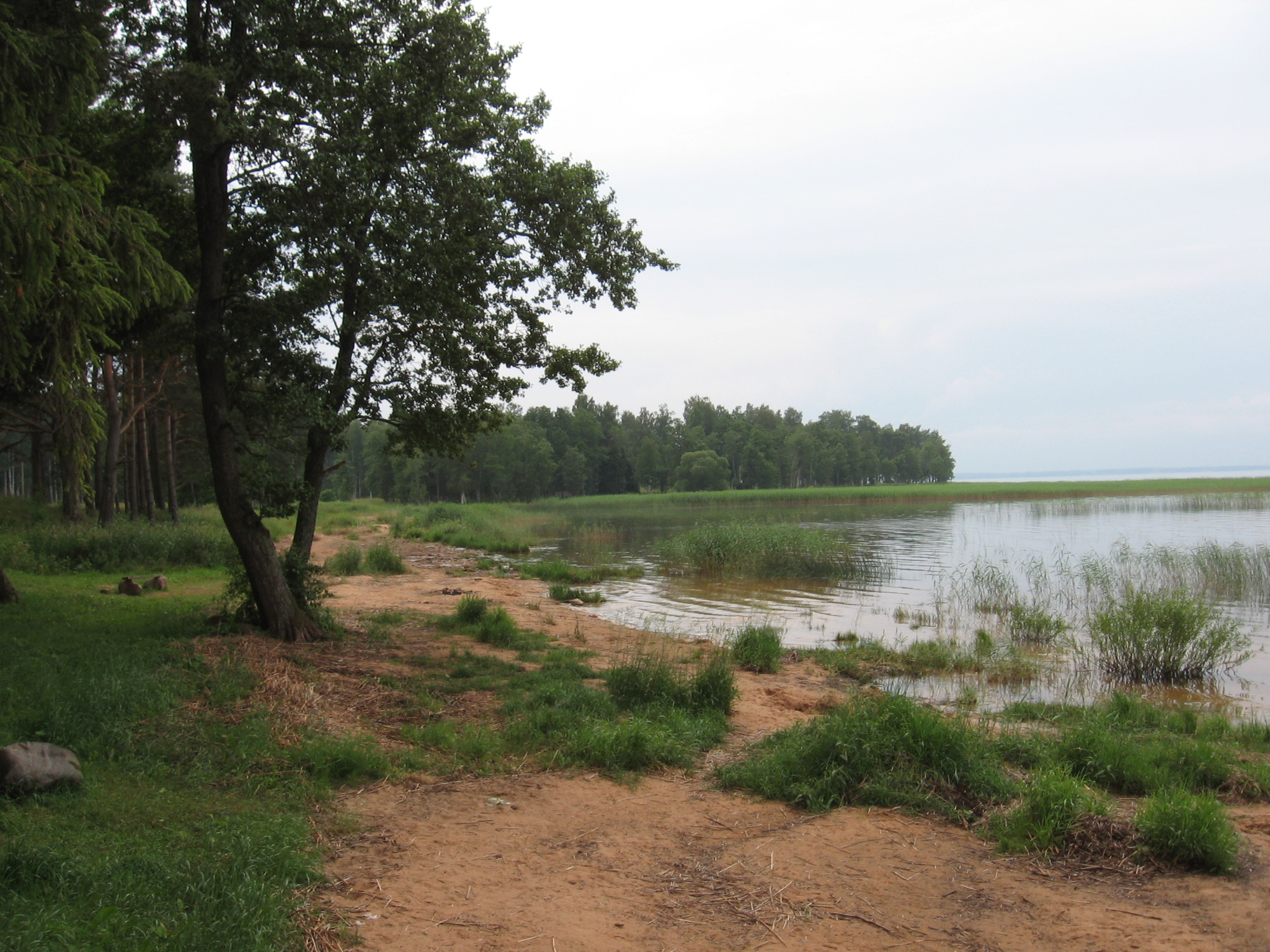
Võrtsjärv near Vehendi

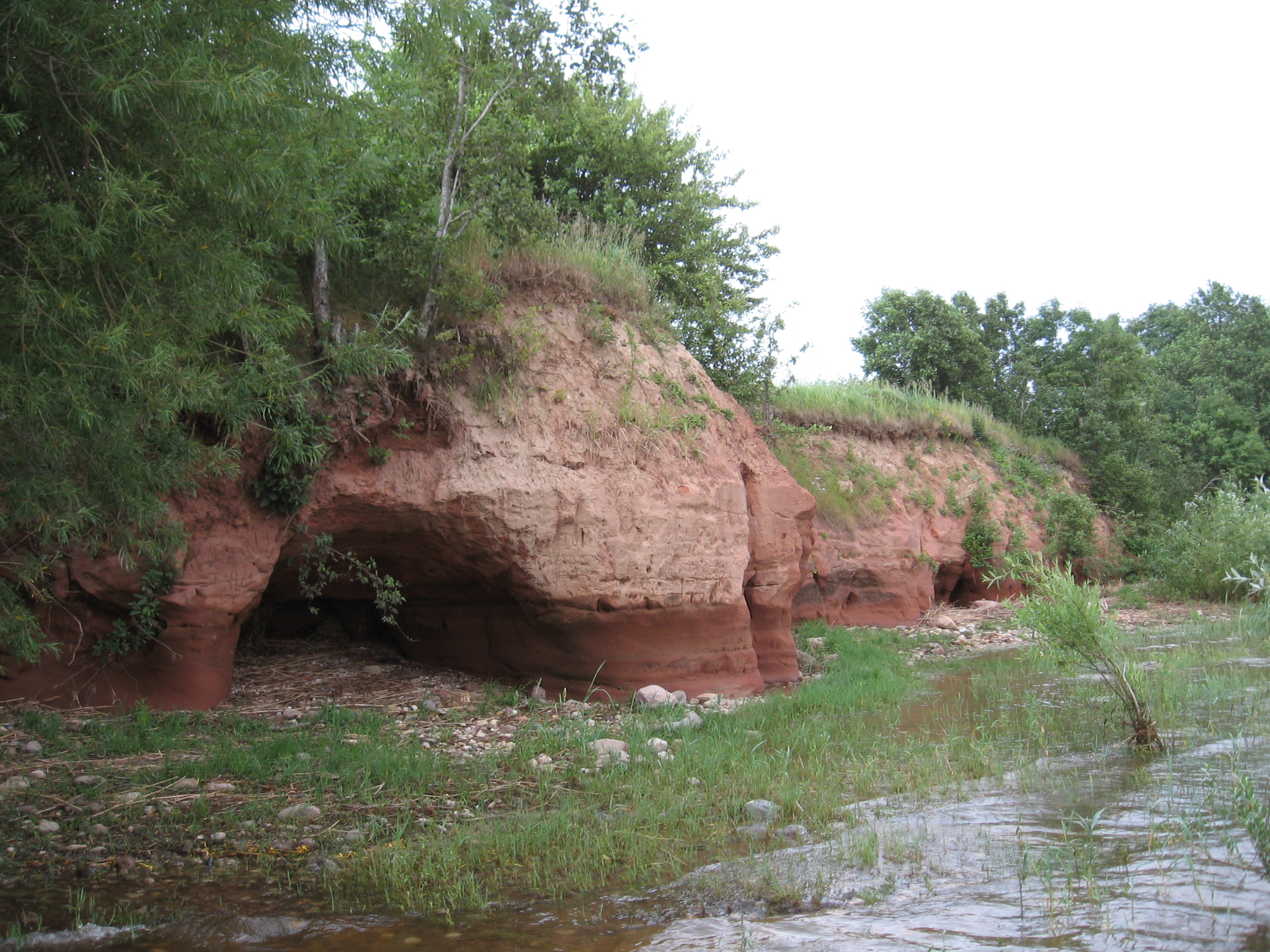
Tamme outcrop near Tamme and Kaarlijärve, on the shore of Võrtsjärv.

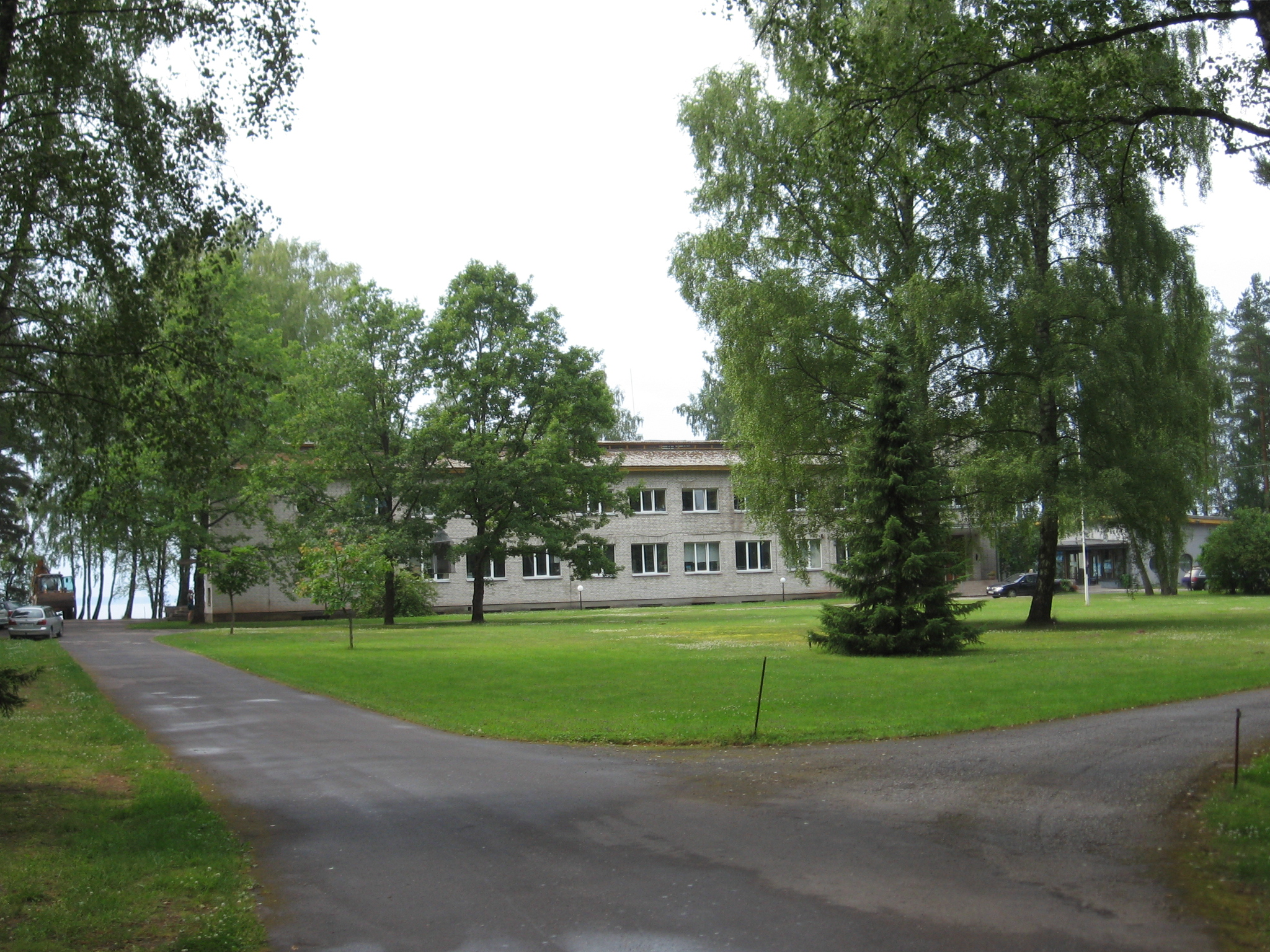
Võrtsjärve Limnology Center in Vehendi.
