= Konguta Parish =

Former municipality of Estonia

Coordinates: 58.225°N 26.294°E

Konguta Parish Konguta vald
- Former municipality of Estonia
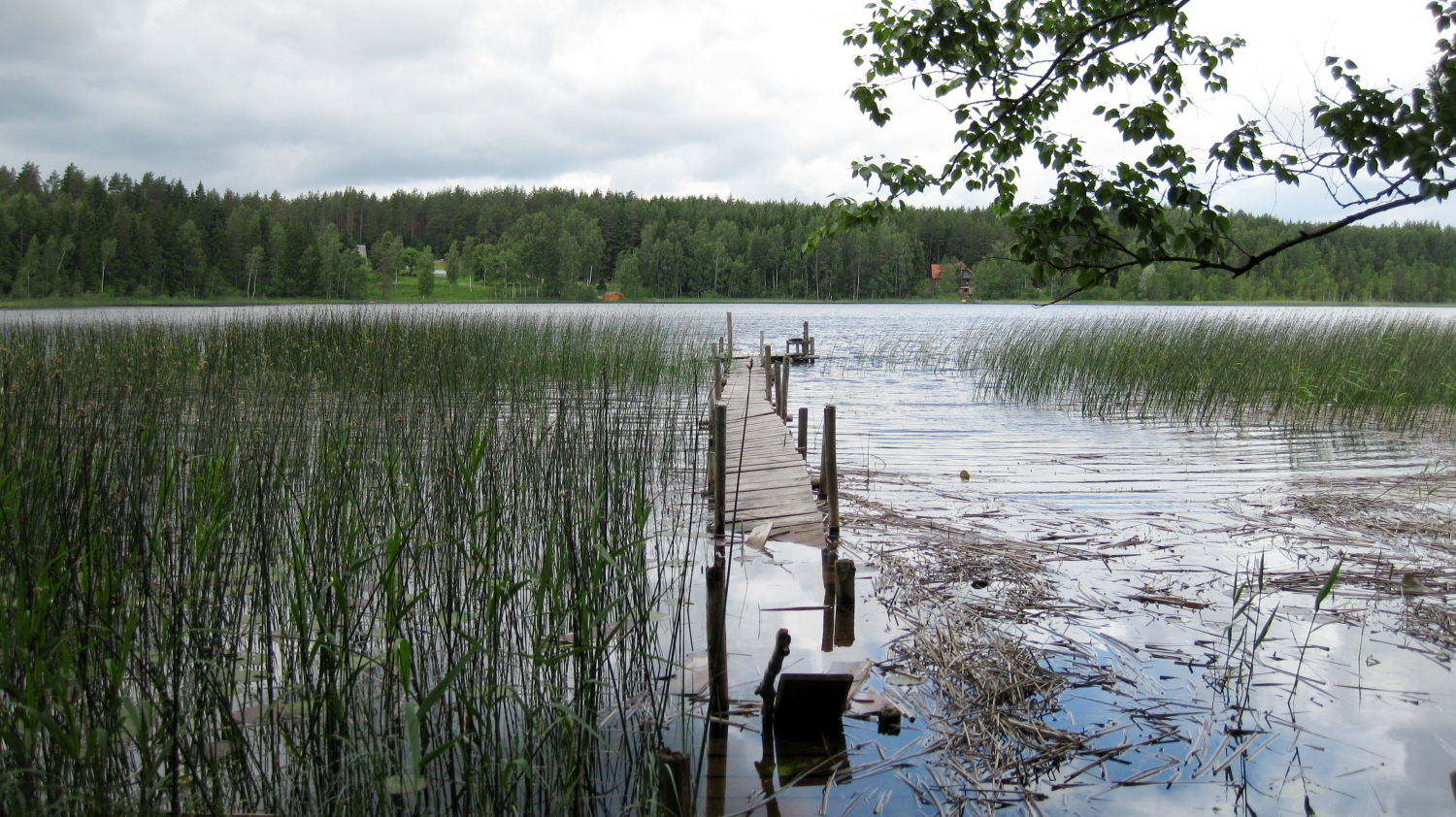
- Lake Viisjaagu in Vellavere

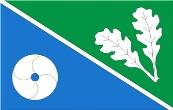
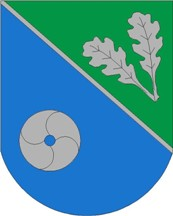
- Flag Coat of arms

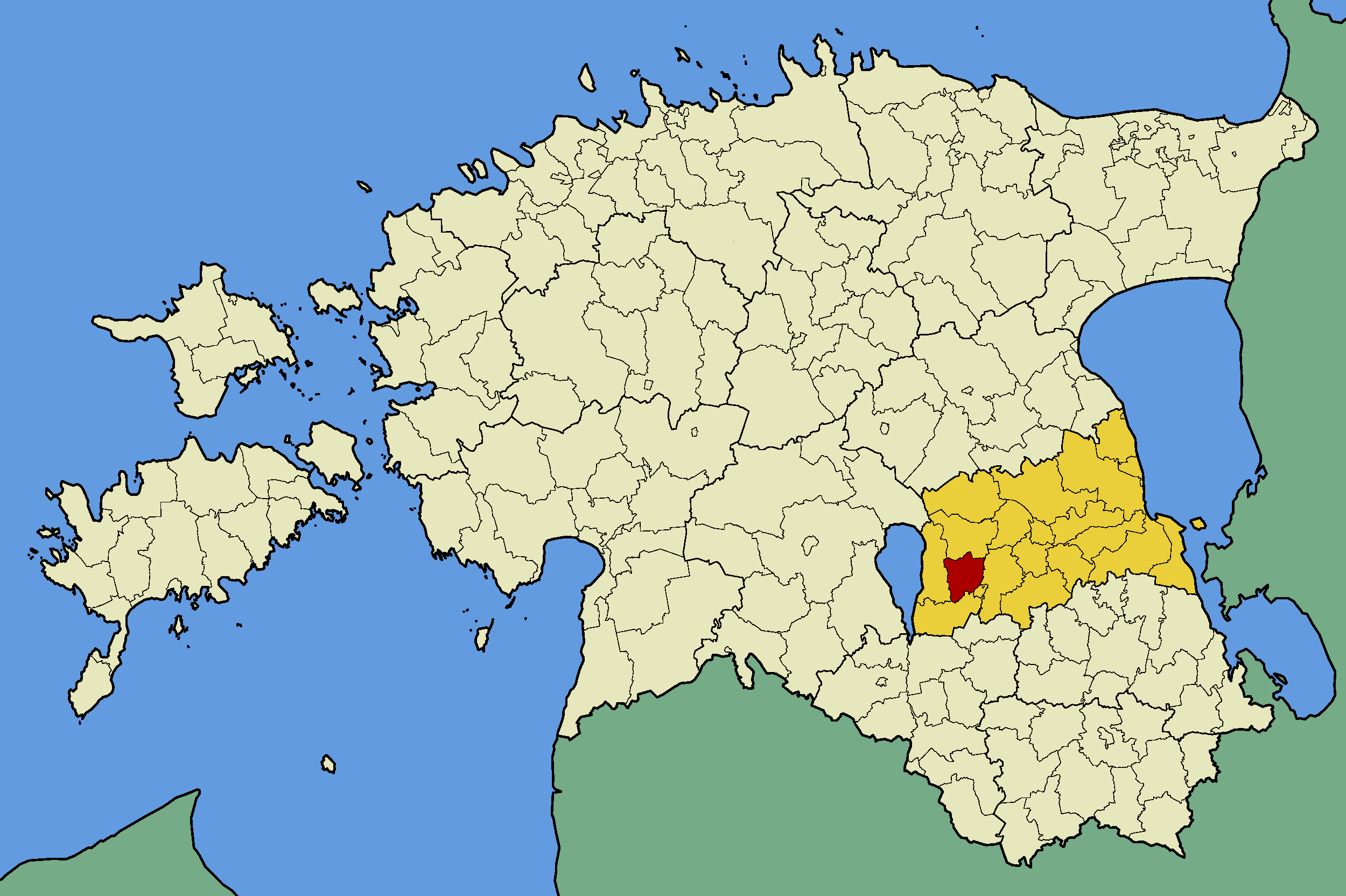
- Konguta Parish within Tartu County.
- Country: Estonia
- County: Tartu County
- Administrative centre: Konguta
- Website: www.konguta.ee

Konguta Parish was a rural municipality in Tartu County, Estonia.

== Settlements ==
Villages
Annikoru
Kapsta
Karijärve
Kobilu
Konguta
Külaaseme
Kurelaane
Lembevere
Mäeotsa
Majala
Mälgi
Metsalaane
Poole
Pööritsa
Vahessaare
Vellavere

== Twinnings ==
- Kinnula Municipality, Finland
