= Rõngu Parish =

Former municipality of Estonia

Coordinates: 58°9′N 26°15′E

Rõngu Parish Rõngu vald
- Former municipality of Estonia
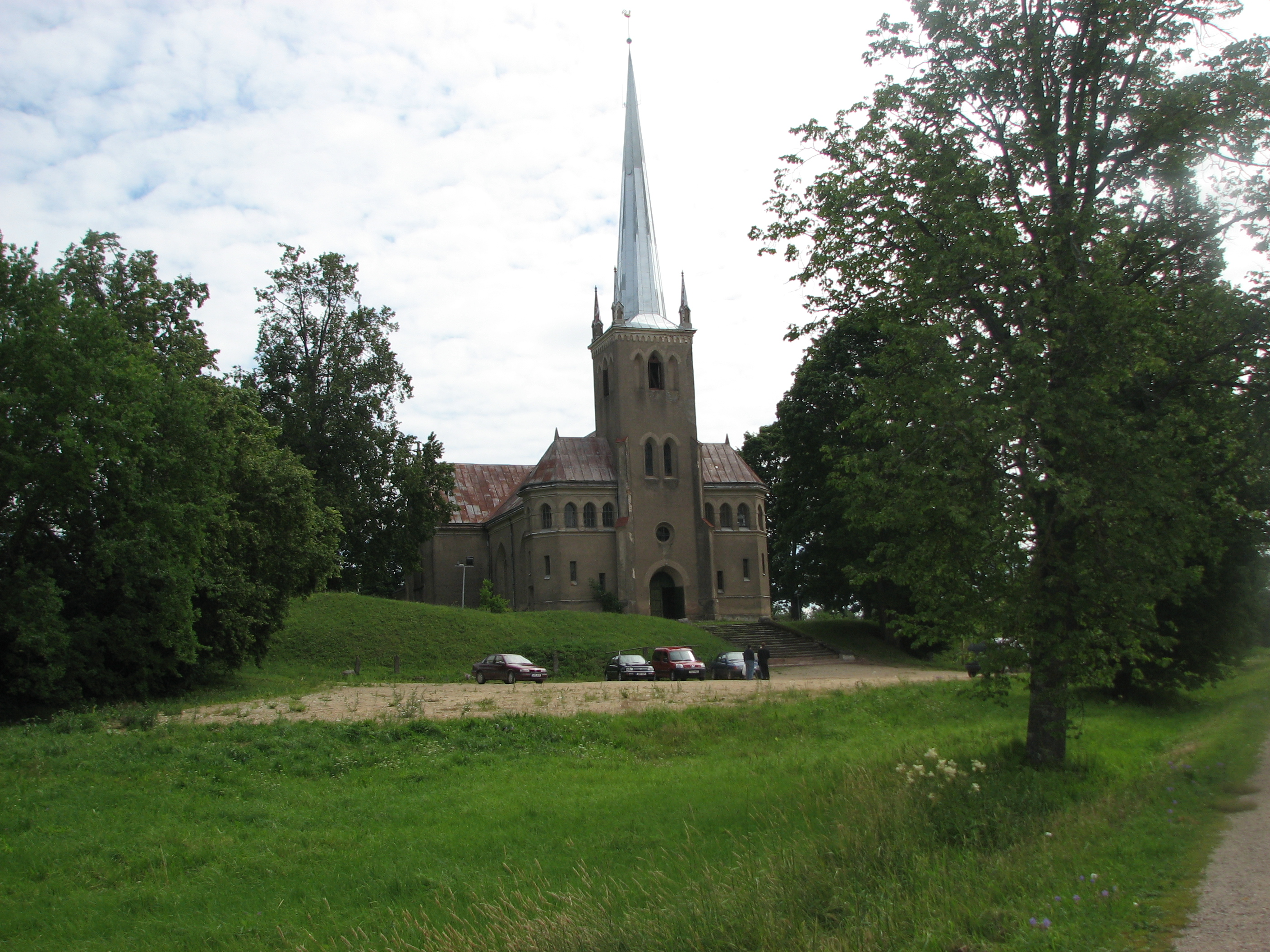
- Rõngu church

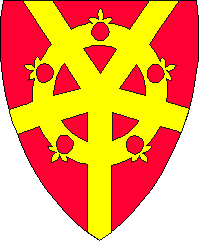
- Flag Coat of arms

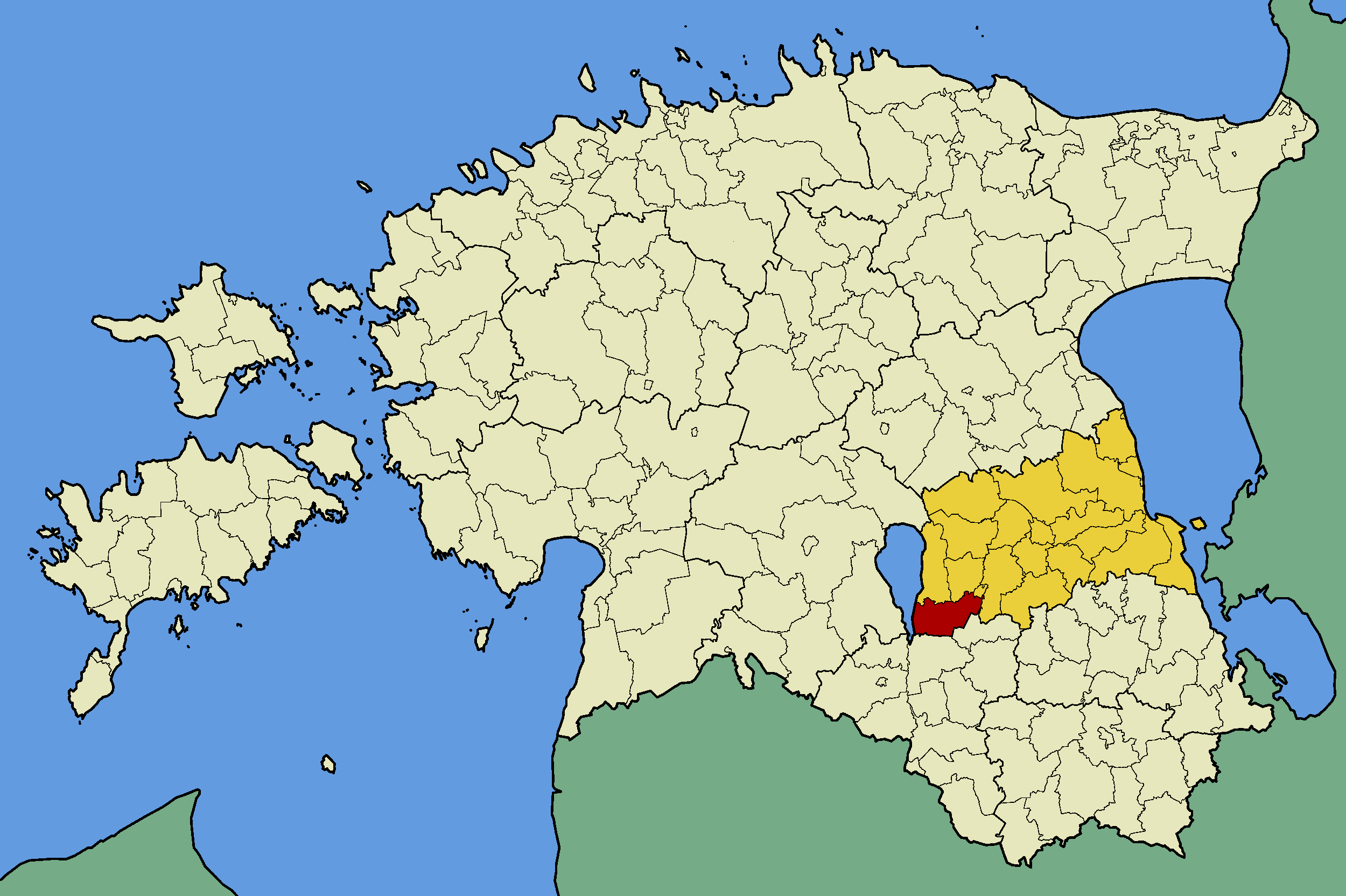
- Rõngu Parish within Tartu County.
- Country: Estonia
- County: Tartu County
- Administrative centre: Rõngu
- Website: www.rongu.ee

Rõngu Parish was a rural municipality in Tartu County, Estonia.

Estonian artist Konrad Mägi (1878-1925) was born in Rõngu Parish.

== Settlements ==
Small boroughs

Käärdi - Rõngu

Villages

Kalme - Käo - Kirepi - Kõduküla - Koruste - Lapetukme - Lossimäe - Piigandi - Raigaste - Rannaküla - Tammiste - Teedla - Tilga - Uderna - Valguta

== Gallery ==
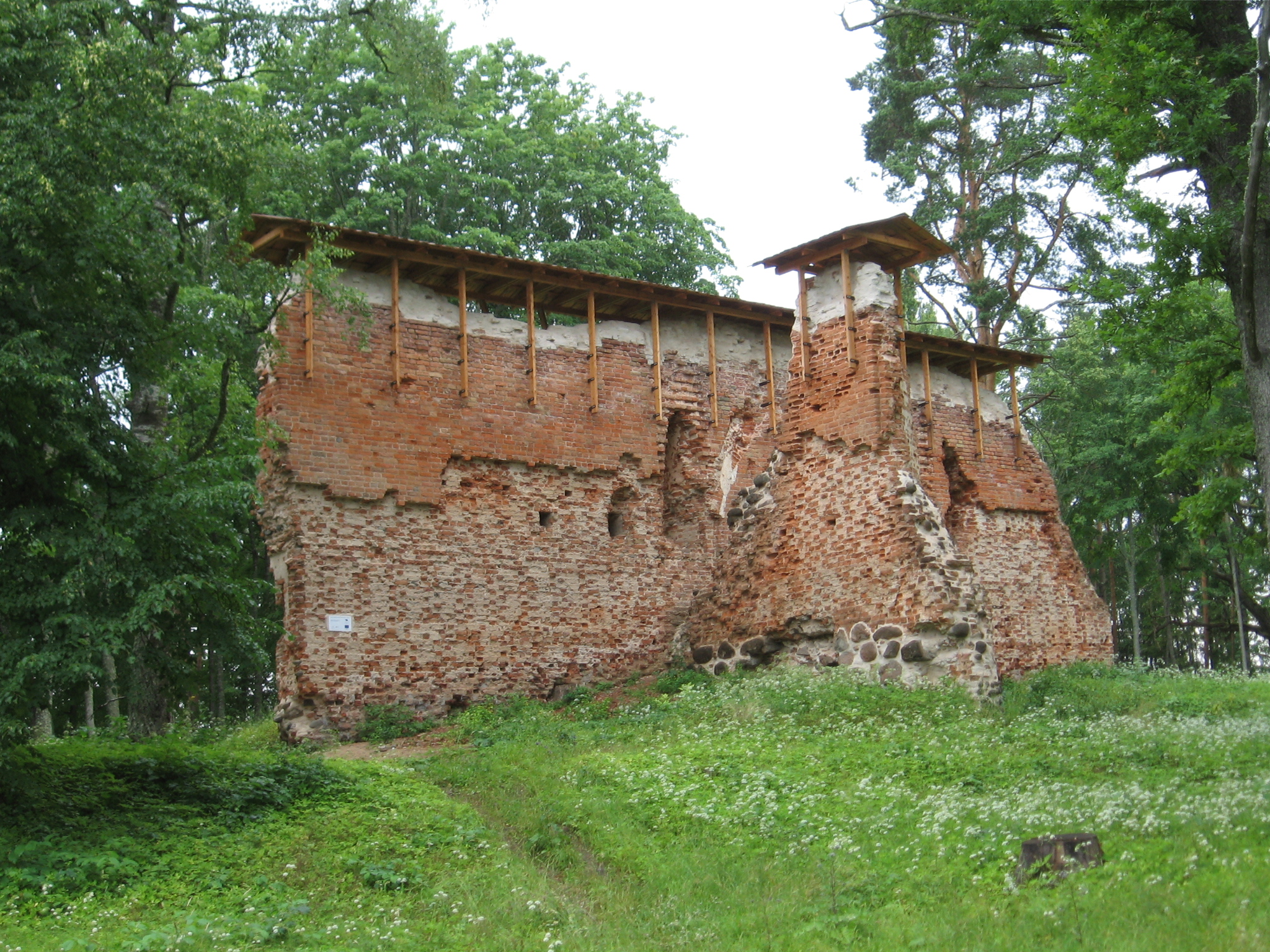
Rõngu castle ruins

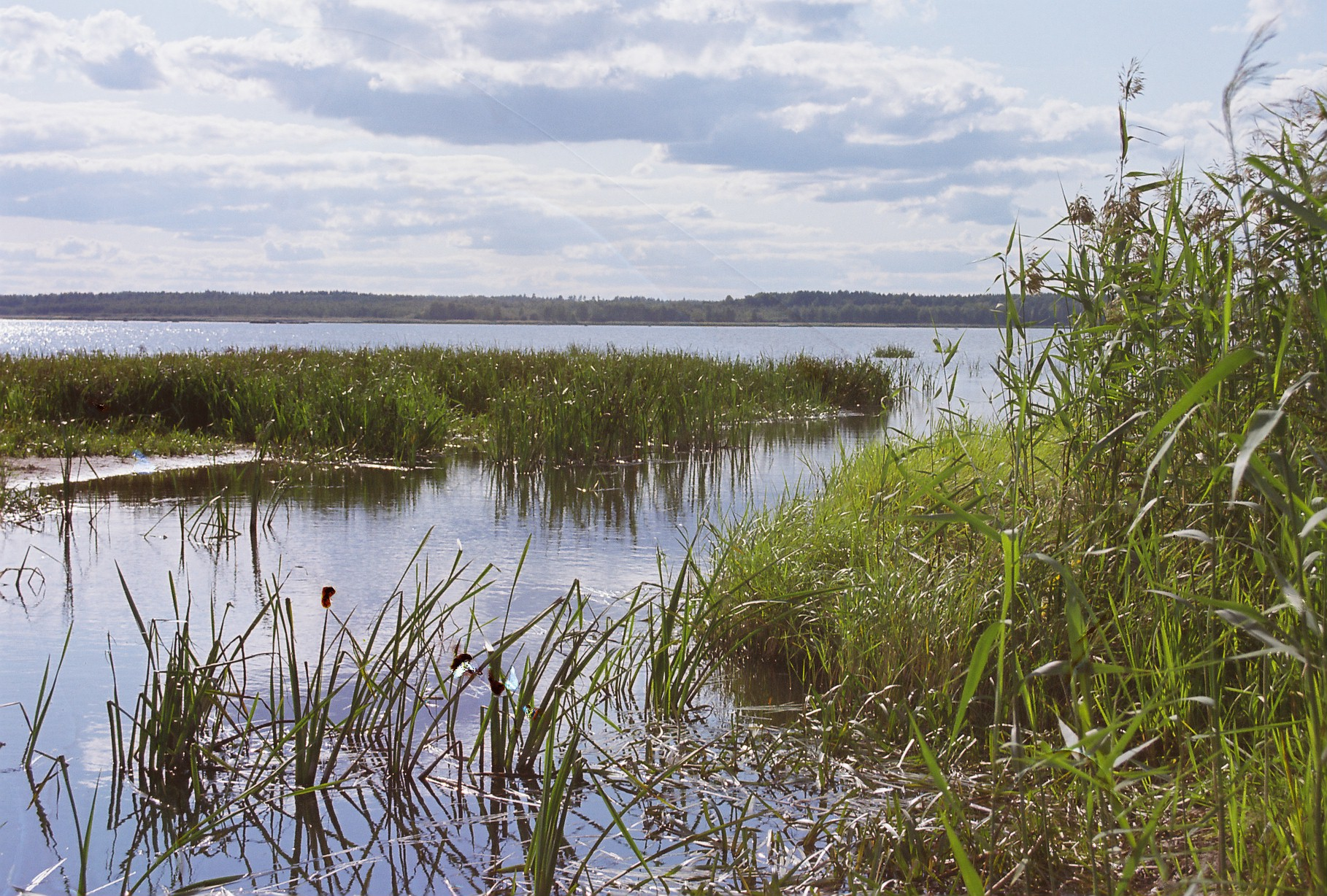
Mouth of Rõngu River into Lake Võrtsjärv between Rannaküla and Koruste.

== Twinnings ==
- Laukaa Municipality, Finland
