= Järveküla =

Järveküla may refer to several places in Estonia:

- Järveküla, Harju County, village in Rae Parish, Harju County
- Järveküla, Saare County, village in Saaremaa Parish, Saare County
- Järveküla, Tartu County, village in Elva Parish, Tartu County
- Järveküla, Viljandi County, village in Viljandi Parish, Viljandi County

== See also ==
- Järvekülä, village in Rõuge Parish, Võru County
- Järvaküla, village in Elva Parish, Tartu County
