= Karijärv =

Lake in Estonia

- Location within Estonia
- Location: Konguta Parish, Tartu County, Estonia
- Coordinates: 58°18′N 26°25′E
- Basin countries: Estonia
- Max. length: 1,980 meters (6,500 ft)
- Surface area: 84 hectares (210 acres)
- Average depth: 5.6 meters (18 ft)
- Max. depth: 14.5 meters (48 ft)
- Water volume: 4,712,000 cubic meters (166,400,000 cu ft)
- Shore length^{1}: 5,080 meters (16,670 ft)
- Surface elevation: 32.7 meters (107 ft)
- ^{1} Shore length is not a well-defined measure.

Karijärv (also Viitina Karijärv is a lake in Estonia. It is located in the village of Karijärve in Elva Parish, Tartu County.

== Physical description ==
The lake has an area of 84 hectares (210 acres). The lake has an average depth of 5.6 meters (18 ft) and a maximum depth of 14.5 meters (48 ft). It is 1,980 meters (6,500 ft) long, and its shoreline measures 5,080 meters (16,670 ft). It has a volume of 4,712,000 cubic meters (166,400,000 cu ft).

== See also ==
- List of lakes of Estonia
