= Sangla =

Sangla may refer to:

- Sangla, India
- Sangla, Nepal
- Sangla Hill, Pakistan
- Sangla, Estonia, village in Rannu Parish, Tartu County, Estonia
