= Teilma =

Teilma may refer to several places in Estonia:

- Teilma, Jõgeva County, village in Jõgeva Parish, Jõgeva County
- Teilma, Tartu County, village in Elva Parish, Tartu County
