= Kõduküla =

Kõduküla may refer to several places in Estonia:

- Kõduküla, Tartu Parish, village in Tartu Parish, Tartu County
- Kõduküla, Elva Parish, village in Elva Parish, Tartu County
