= Väike-Rakke =

Väike-Rakke may refer to several places in Estonia:

- Väike-Rakke, Lääne-Viru County, village in Väike-Maarja Parish, Lääne-Viru County
- Väike-Rakke, Tartu County, village in Elva Parish, Tartu County

== See also ==
- Suure-Rakke, several places in Estonia
- Rakke, small borough in Väike-Maarja Parish, Lääne-Viru County
