= Elva Parish =

Municipality of Estonia (2017)

Elva Parish Elva vald
- Municipality of Estonia
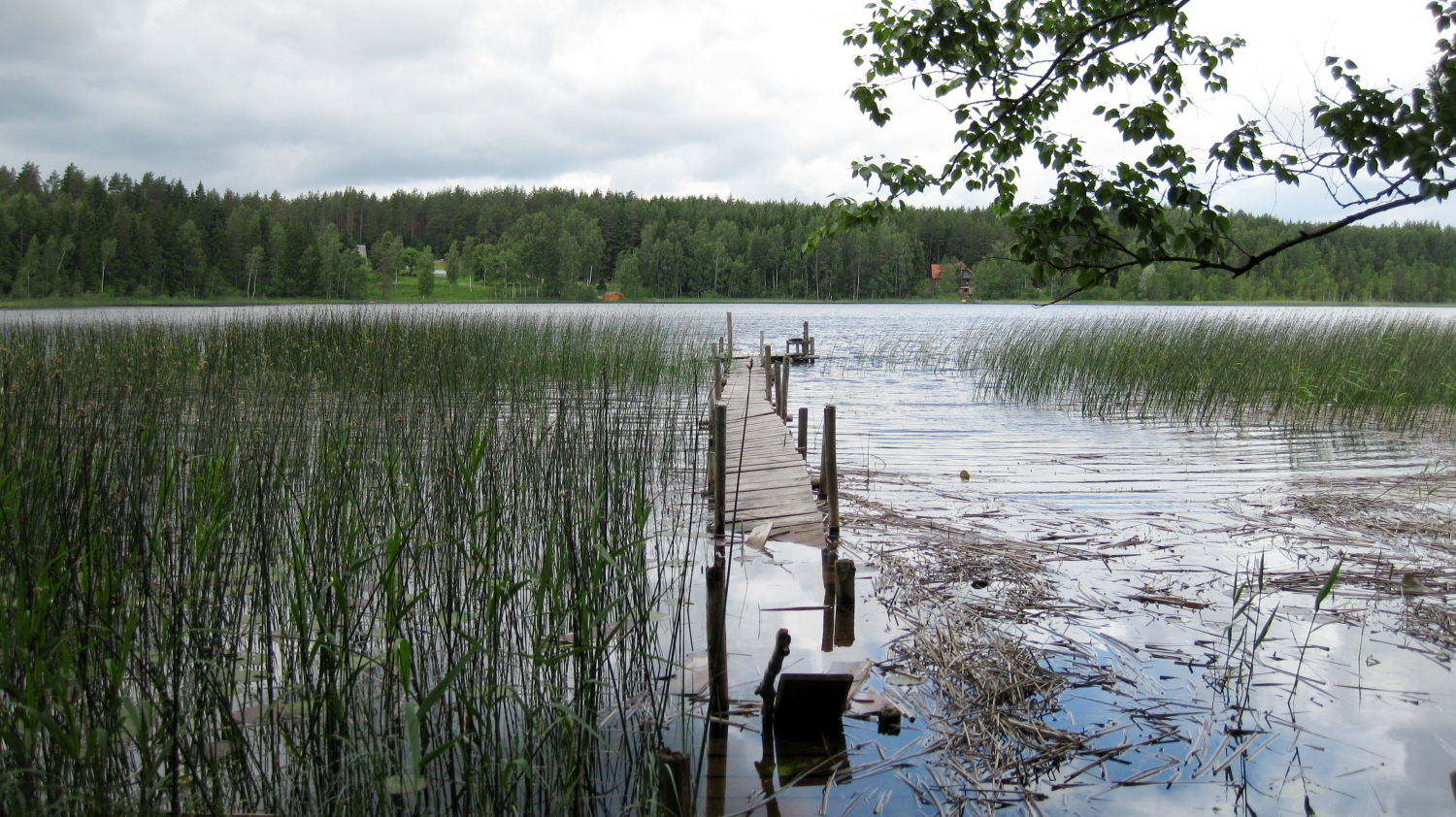
- Lake Viisjaagu in Vellavere

- Flag Coat of arms

- Elva Parish within Tartu County
- Coordinates: 58°14′N 26°23′E
- Country: Estonia
- County: Tartu County
- Formed: 2017
- Administrative centre: Elva

Area
  - Total: 650 km^{2} (250 sq mi)

Population (2026)
  - Total: 14,624
  - Density: 22/km^{2} (58/sq mi)
- Time zone: UTC+2 (EET)
  - Summer (DST): UTC+3 (EEST)
- ISO 3166 code: EE-171
- Website: www.elva.ee

Elva is a rural parish in Tartu County, Estonia, with an area of 650 km^{2} (250 sq mi). As of 2017, it has a population of 14,241 inhabitants. It was created in 2017 from the merger of the municipality Elva with the rural communities Konguta Parish, Puhja Parish, Rannu Parish and Rõngu Parish.

== Demographics ==
As of 1 January 2026, the parish had 14,624 residents, of which 7,485 (51.2%) were women and 7,139 (48.8%) were men.

In addition to the main town Elva (5,669 inhabitants), a number of villages are part of the parish including Annikoru, Ervu, Härjanurme, Järvaküla, Järveküla, Käärdi, Kaarlijärve, Kaimi, Kalme, Kapsta, Karijärve, Kipastu, Kirepi, Kobilu, Kõduküla, Konguta, Koopsi, Koruste, Külaaseme, Kulli, Kurelaane, Lapetukme, Lembevere, Lilleküla, Lossimäe, Mäeotsa, Mäeselja, Majala, Mälgi, Metsalaane, Mõisanurme, Nasja, Neemisküla, Noorma, Paju, Palupõhja, Piigandi, Poole, Pööritsa, Poriküla, Raigaste, Ramsi, Rannaküla, Ridaküla, Rõngu, Saare, Sangla, Suure-Rakke, Tamme, Tammiste, Tännassilma, Teedla, Teilma, Tilga, Uderna, Ulila, Utukolga, Vahessaare, Väike-Rakke, Valguta, Vallapalu, Vehendi, Vellavere, Verevi, Vihavu, Võllinge, and Võsivere.

The most common religion is Lutheranism, although most of the municipality's adult residents are unaffiliated.

== Notable people ==
- Konrad Mägi (1878 in Hellenurme – 1925), painter, one of the first modernist painters in Estonia and the Nordic countries.
- August Maramaa (1881 in Aakre – 1941), politician, teacher and Mayor of Viljandi from 1919-1921 and 1927-1939.
- Jaan Kriisa (1882 in Ulila – 1942), lawyer, politician, Mayor of Tartu, 1917/1918 and 1919; Minister of Nutrition, 1919/1920
- Christian Kaarna (1882 in Atra – 1943), journalist, banker, politician and director of the Bank of Estonia, 1928 to 1940
- Juhan Kartau (1883 in Uderna – 1964), politician and Minister of Education, in 1919
- Hanno Kompus (1890 in Rannu – 1974), an art and theatre critic, art historian, theatre director and architect.
- Jaan Kärner (1891 in Käo – 1958), poet and writer of nature poetry, novels, plays and literary criticism.
- Rudolf Tihane (1892 in Palupõhja – 1977), weightlifter, bronze medallist at the 1922 World Weightlifting Championships
- Alice Kuperjanov (1894 in Aru – 1942), freedom fighter, nationalist, and promoter of women's movements
- Eduard Oja (1905 in Palupõhja – 1950), composer, conductor, music teacher and critic.
- Hans Kauri (1906 in Puhja – 1999), entomologist, zoologist, and politician; he worked on arachnids.
- Herbert Tampere (1909 in Järveküla – 1975), folklorist and musicologist, especially of Runic song
- Olav Roots (1910 in Uderna – 1974), pianist and composer; chief conductor of Estonian National Symphony Orchestra from 1939.
- Lea Tormis (1932 in Pikasilla – 2025), theatre scholar, historian and professor at the Academy of Music and Theatre from 1996
- Ivo Kuusk (1937 in Konguta – 2023), an opera tenor in the Estonian National Opera
- Mati Ahven (1943 in Rannu – 2022), an engineer, mechanic and politician
- Mai Treial (born 1952 in Palupera), politician, Chairman of Jõgeva City Council from 2013
- Meelis Aasmäe (born 1972 in Palupera), cross-country skier, competed in the 1998 & 2002 Winter Olympics
