= Herbert Tampere =

Estonian folklorist and musicologist (1909-1975)

- Born: February 1, 1909; Uniküla, Elva Parish
- Died: January 19, 1975 (aged 65); Rannu
- Education: University of Tartu

Herbert Tampere (1 February 1909 – 19 January 1975) was an Estonian folklorist and musicologist.

From 1927 to 1933, he studied at the University of Tartu. From 1929 until 1945, he worked as an assistant at Estonian Folklore Archives. Since 1945 (with pauses) he taught folk music at the Tallinn Conservatory.

His main field of research was folk music, especially runo songs. In total, he melodized over 2000 folk tunes, and he made over 4000 sound recordings.

== Award ==
- 1969: Estonian SSR merited artistic personnel

== Publications ==
- 1935: Eesti rahvaviiside antoloogia, Eesti Akadeemilise Helikunstnikkude Seltsi Toimetused, Tartu
- 1937: Über das Problem des Rhythmus im alten estnischen Volkslied, Acta Ethnologica 2, 1937: 1, pp 65–78
- 1938: Valimik eesti rahvatantse. Krüger, Tartu (with R. Põldmäe)
