= Suure-Rakke =

Suure-Rakke may refer to several places in Estonia:

- Suure-Rakke, Lääne-Viru County, a village in Väike-Maarja Parish, Lääne-Viru County
- Suure-Rakke, Tartu County, a village in Rannu Parish, Tartu County

== See also ==
- Väike-Rakke (disambiguation), several places in Estonia
- Rakke, a small borough in Väike-Maarja Parish, Lääne-Viru County
