= Rõngu =

Borough in Estonia

- Small borough
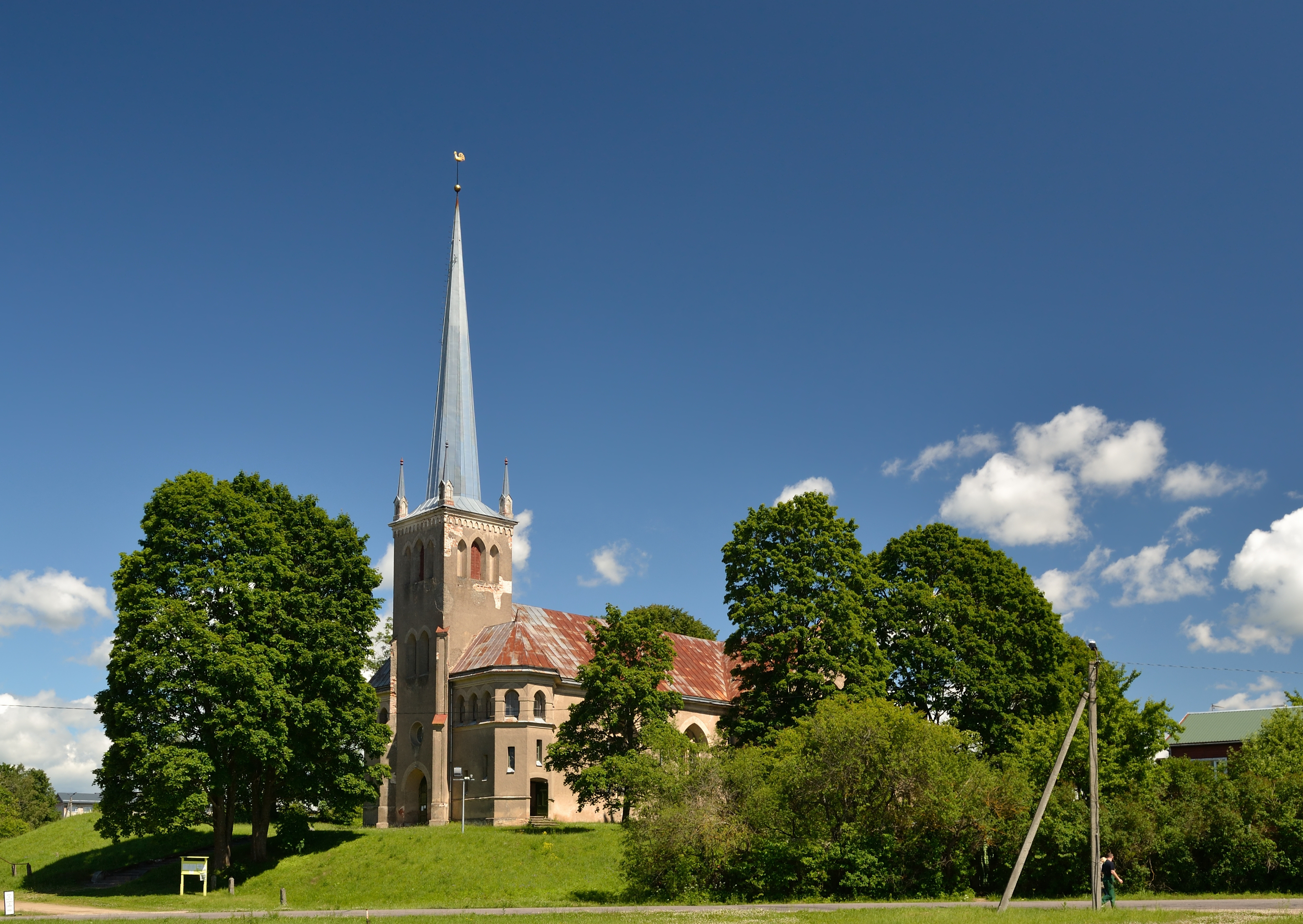
- Rõngu church

- Location in Estonia
- Coordinates: 58°08′29″N 26°14′50″E
- Country: Estonia
- County: Tartu County
- Municipality: Elva Parish

Population (2019)
  - Total: 691
- Time zone: UTC+2 (EET)
  - Summer (DST): UTC+3 (EEST)

Rõngu (German: Ringen) is a small borough (alevik) in Elva Parish, Tartu County, southern Estonia. Prior to the administrative reform of Estonian local governments in 2017, it was the administrative centre of Rõngu Parish.

== Sights ==
=== Rõngu castle ruins ===
The present-day ruins, located in the neighbouring Lossimäe village, are the visible remains of a so-called "vassal castle", i.e. a smaller fortress not designed for major military operations, established in the early 14th century. Built in the south-western part of the Bishopric of Dorpat, it probably served to control the bishopric's border there. The castle was centred on a rectangular courtyard which was surrounded by wings. The gate, the remains of which are most prominently visible today, was strengthened by a gatehouse that also housed a chapel on its second floor. During the Livonian War, the castle was pillaged by Russian troops. After 1583, when the area came under the influence of the Polish–Lithuanian Commonwealth as the Duchy of Livonia, it was still in use, this time by local Jesuits. The Jesuits however blew up the castle amid the events that led to the Truce of Altmark and the subsequent incorporation of the area into Swedish Livonia.

=== Rõngu church ===
Although the church dates from the late 14th century, only fragments of the original building have survived as the church was devastated during both the Livonian War and the Great Northern War. The church seen today is a heavily rebuilt Neo-Gothic edifice which received its look during the late 19th century.

== Gallery ==
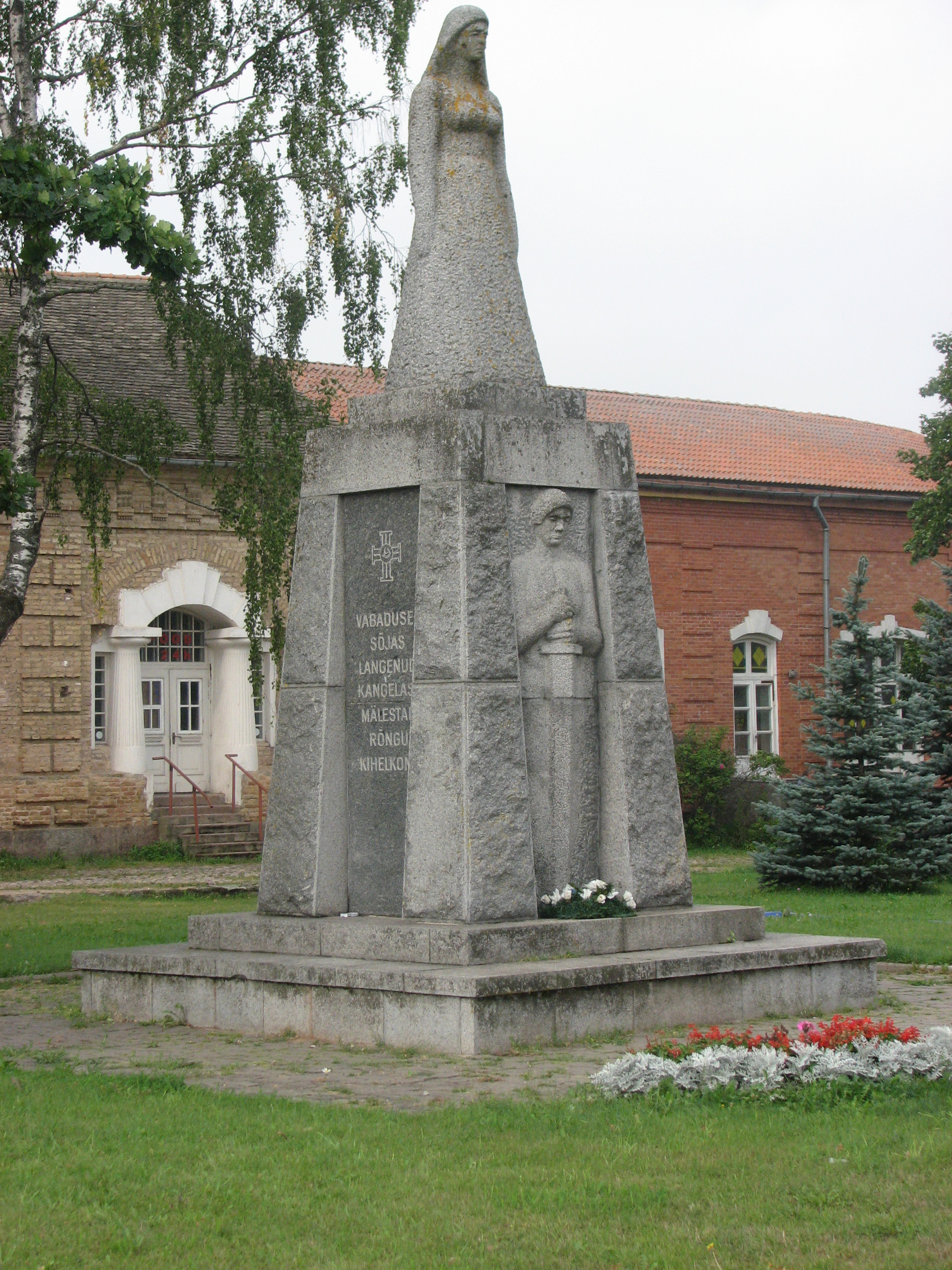
War of Independence memorial

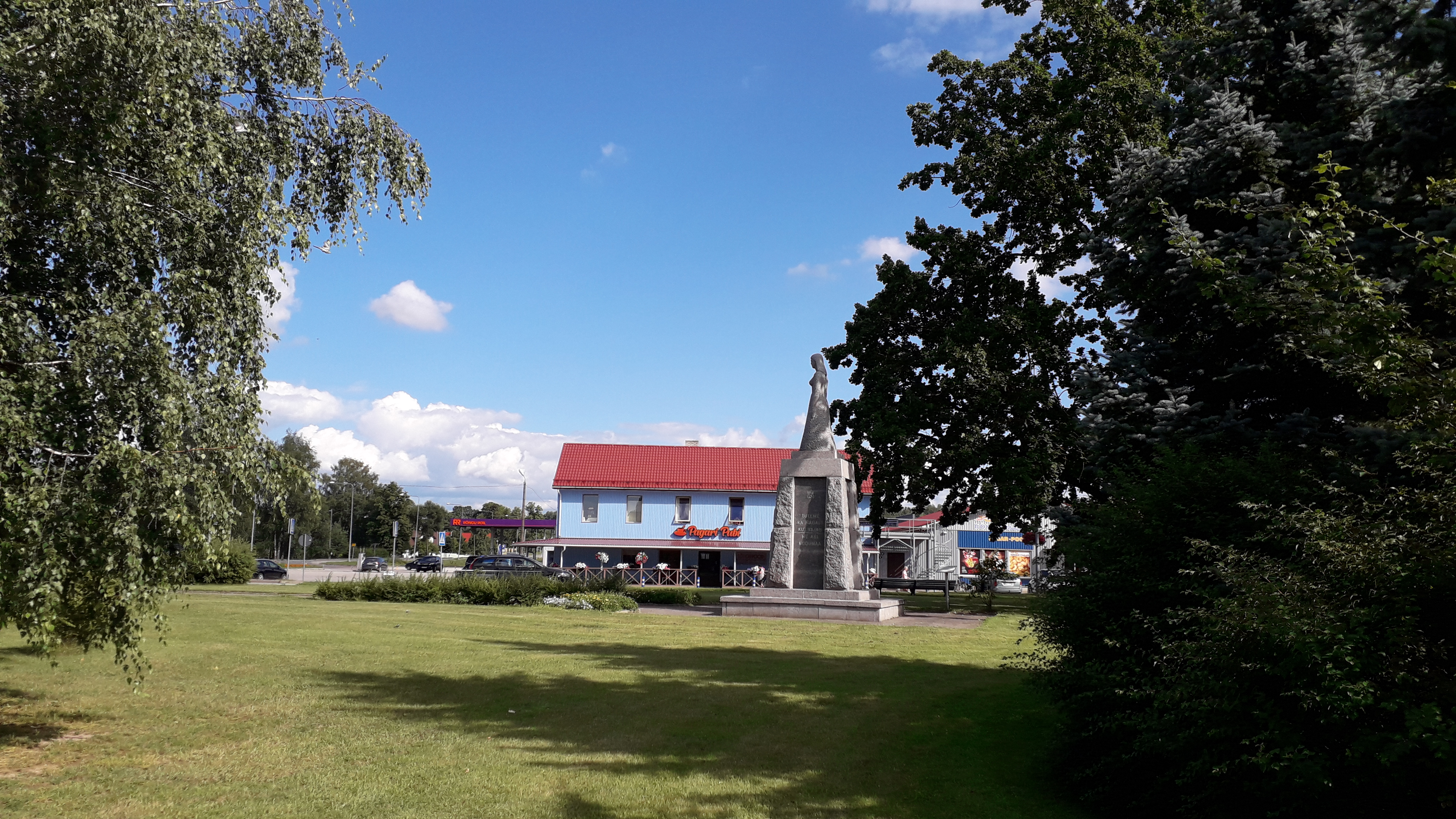
Small park in the center of Rõngu
