= Verevi =

Village in Estonia

- village
- Location in Estonia
- Coordinates: 58°22′37″N 26°11′26″E
- Country: Estonia
- County: Tartu County
- Municipality: Elva Parish
- First mentioned: 1582

Population (01.01.2010)
  - Total: 38

Verevi is a village in Elva Parish, Tartu County, in southern Estonia. It has a population of 38 (as of 1 January 2010).

Verevi is bordered to the west by Lake Võrtsjärv, to the north by Emajõgi River, to the east by Sangla bog and to the south by Suure-Rakke village. The Tartu–Viljandi road (nr. 92) passes Verevi on its western side, just before Võrtsjärv

Verevi was first mentioned in 1582 as Werva Wielka. But the place itself was inhabited a long time before, as proven by ancient gravesites.

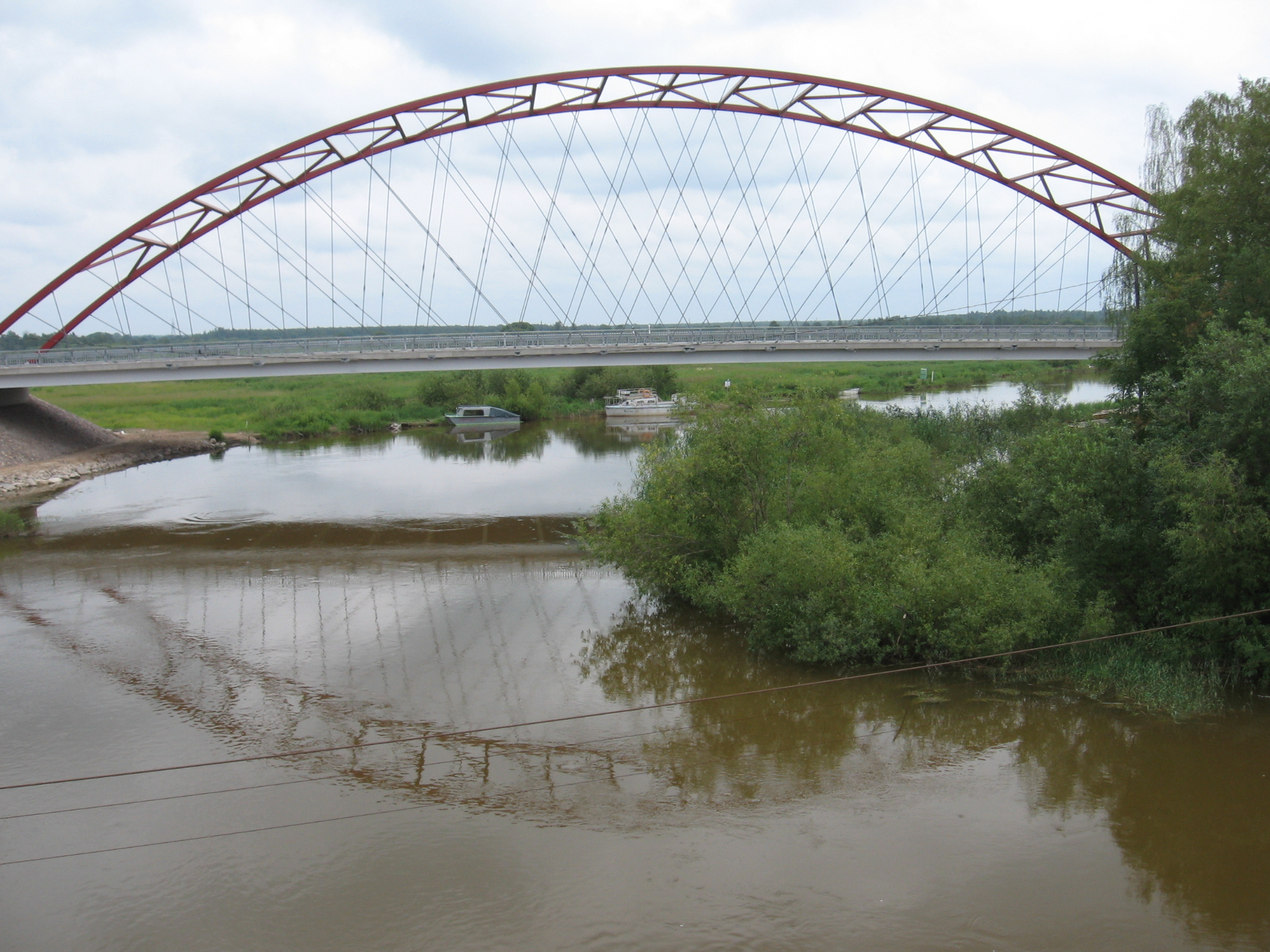
The bridge of Tartu–Viljandi road over the Emajõgi near its source the Lake Võrtsjärv, on the northwestern side of Verevi
