= Neemisküla =

Village in Estonia

- Village
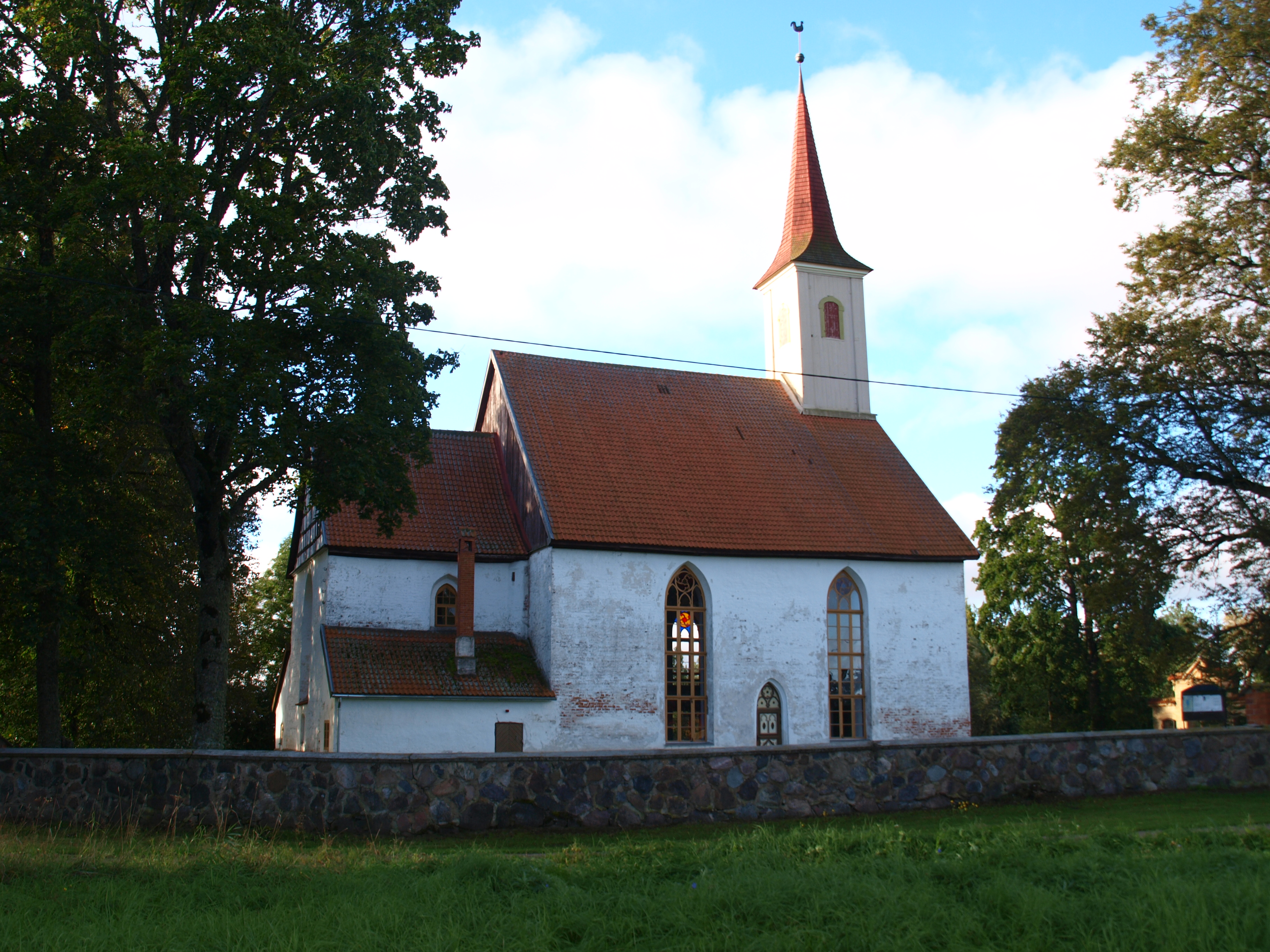
- St. Martin Rannu Church in Neemisküla

- Location within Estonia
- Coordinates: 58.2975°N 26.1731°E
- Country: Estonia
- County: Tartu County
- Parish: Elva Parish
- Time zone: UTC+2 (EET)
  - Summer (DST): UTC+3 (EEST)

Neemisküla is a village in Tartu County, Elva Parish.

Before the administrative reform in Estonia in 2017, the village belonged to Rannu Parish.

Neemisküla is home to Rannu Church.
