= Piigandi, Tartu County =

Village in Estonia

Piigandi
- Village
- Location in Estonia
- Coordinates: 58°11′34″N 26°11′01″E
- Country: Estonia
- County: Tartu County
- Municipality: Elva Parish

Population (01.01.2005)
  - Total: 49

Piigandi is a village in Elva Parish, Tartu County in southern Estonia. It has a population of 49 (as of 1 January 2005).
