= Lilleküla (village) =

Village in Estonia

- Village
- Location in Estonia
- Coordinates: 58°21′34″N 26°25′31″E
- Country: Estonia
- County: Tartu County
- Municipality: Elva Parish

Population (01.01.2010)
  - Total: 33

Lilleküla (before 2019 Kureküla) is a village in Elva Parish, Tartu County, Estonia. It has a population of 33 (as of 1 January 2010).
