= Vehendi =

Village in Estonia

- Village
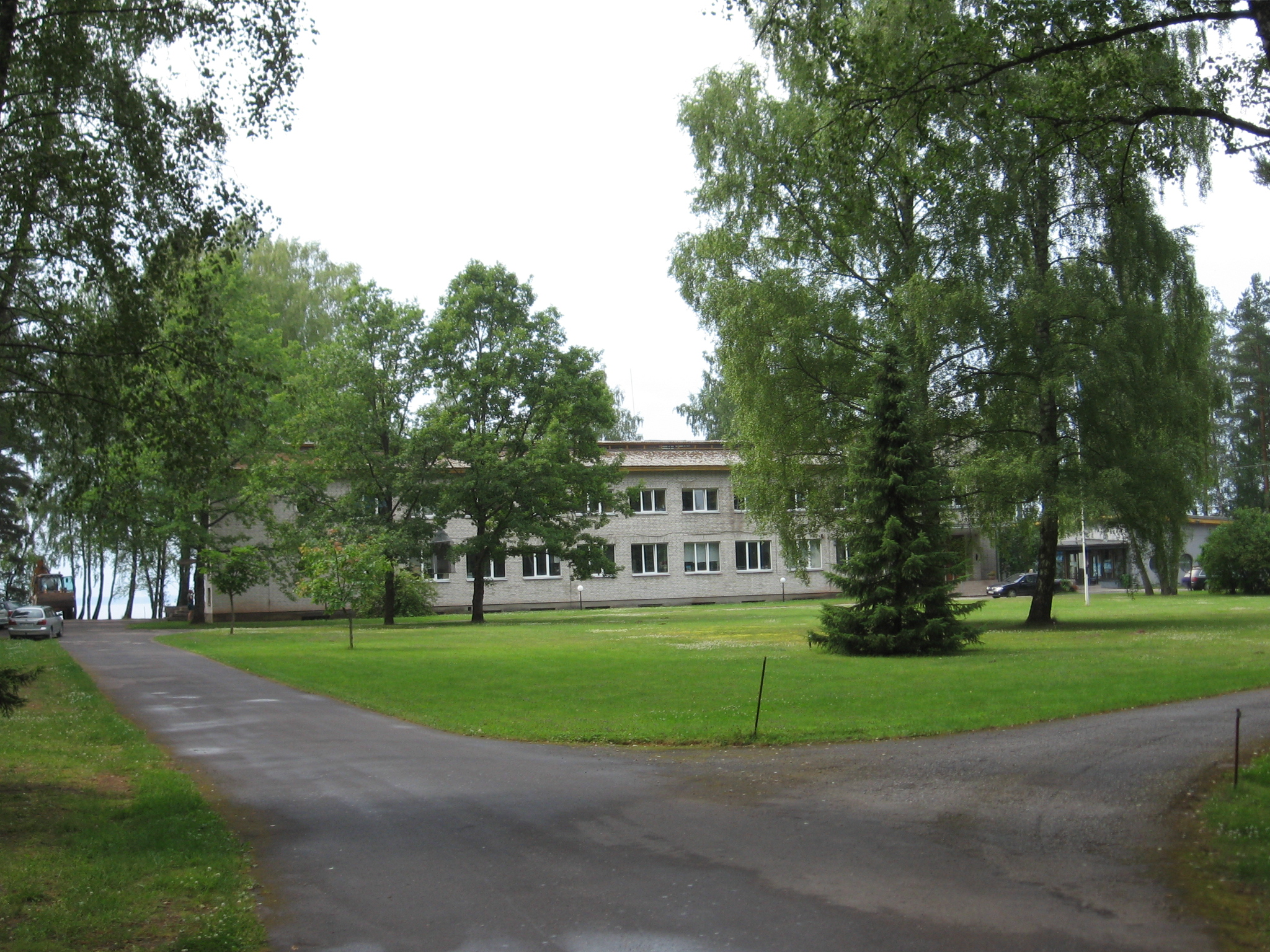
- Võrtsjärv Limnology Center, part of the Estonian University of Life Sciences, located in Vehendi

- Location within Estonia
- Coordinates: 58.225°N 26.131388888889°E
- Country: Estonia
- County: Tartu County
- Parish: Elva Parish
- Time zone: UTC+2 (EET)
  - Summer (DST): UTC+3 (EEST)

Vehendi is a village in Elva Parish, Tartu County in Estonia. It is located near Lake Võrtsjärv.
