= Nasja =

Village in Estonia

- Village
- Location in Estonia
- Coordinates: 58°21′36″N 26°21′07″E
- Country: Estonia
- County: Tartu County
- Municipality: Elva Parish

Population (01.01.2010)
  - Total: 34

Nasja is a village in Elva Parish, Tartu County, Estonia. It has a population of 34 (as of 1 January 2010).
