= Tammiste, Tartu County =

Village in Estonia

Tammiste
- Village
- Location in Estonia
- Coordinates: 58°11′38″N 26°19′41″E
- Country: Estonia
- County: Tartu County
- Municipality: Elva Parish

Population (2006)
  - Total: 120

Tammiste is a village in Elva Parish, Tartu County in southern Estonia. It has a population of 120 (as of 2006).
