= Tännassilma, Tartu County =

Village in Estonia

Tännassilma
- Village
- Location in Estonia
- Coordinates: 58°20′04″N 26°17′54″E
- Country: Estonia
- County: Tartu County
- Municipality: Elva Parish

Population (01.01.2010)
  - Total: 45

Tännassilma is a village in Elva Parish, Tartu County, Estonia. It has a population of 45 (as of 1 January 2010).
