= Teilma, Jõgeva County =

Village in Estonia

Coordinates: 58°45′N 26°37′E

Teilma
- Village
- Interactive map of Teilma
- Country: Estonia
- County: Jõgeva County
- Parish: Jõgeva Parish
- Time zone: UTC+2 (EET)
  - Summer (DST): UTC+3 (EEST)

Teilma is a village in Jõgeva Parish, Jõgeva County in eastern Estonia.
