= Kõduküla, Elva Parish =

Village in Estonia

Kõduküla
- Village
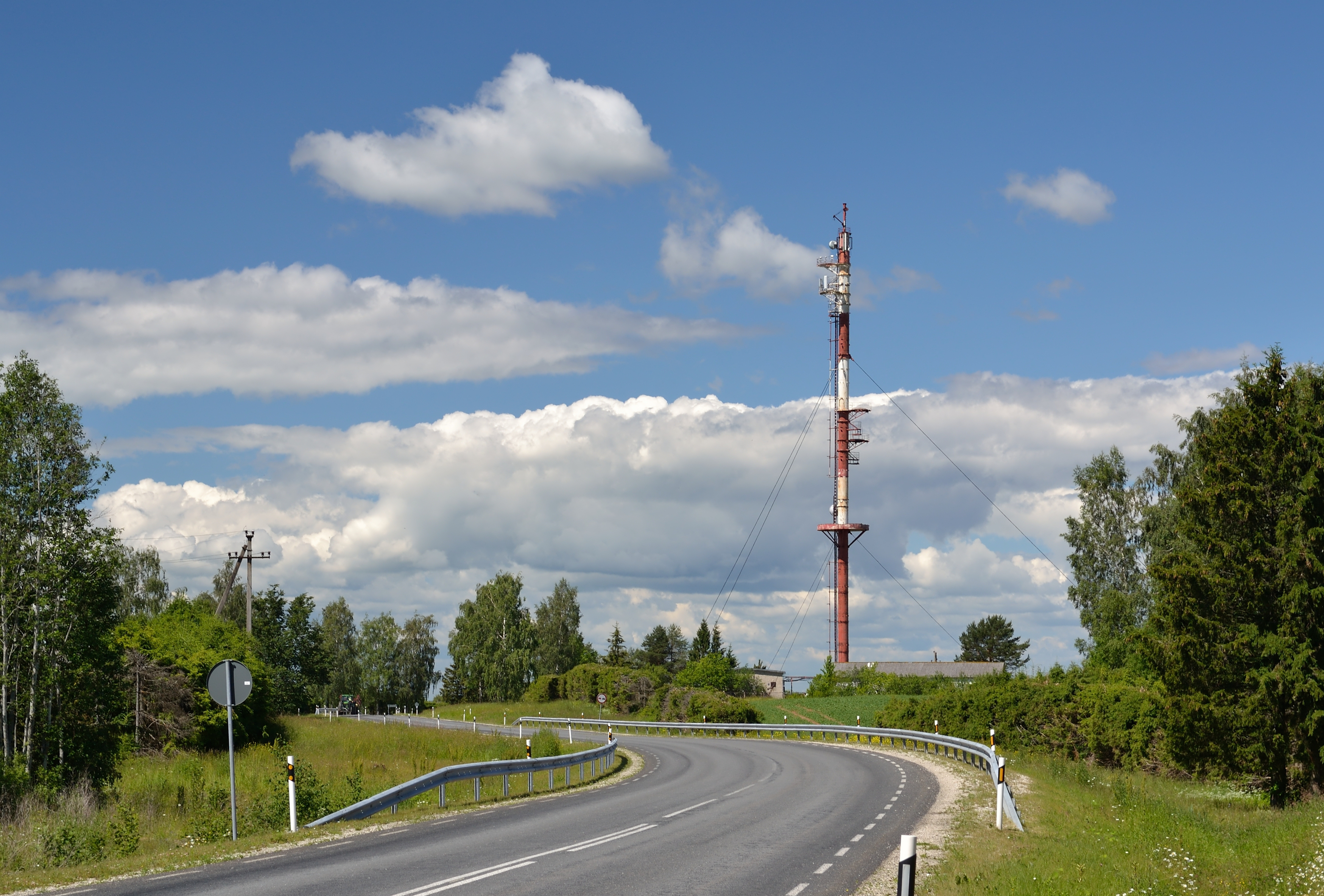
- Rõngu–Otepää–Kanepi road (nr 71) in Kõduküla.

- Location in Estonia
- Coordinates: 58°08′48″N 26°18′05″E
- Country: Estonia
- County: Tartu County
- Municipality: Elva Parish

Population (2006)
  - Total: 113

Kõduküla is a village in Elva Parish, Tartu County in southern Estonia. It has a population of 113 (as of 2006).
