= Ulila =

Borough in Estonia

- Small borough
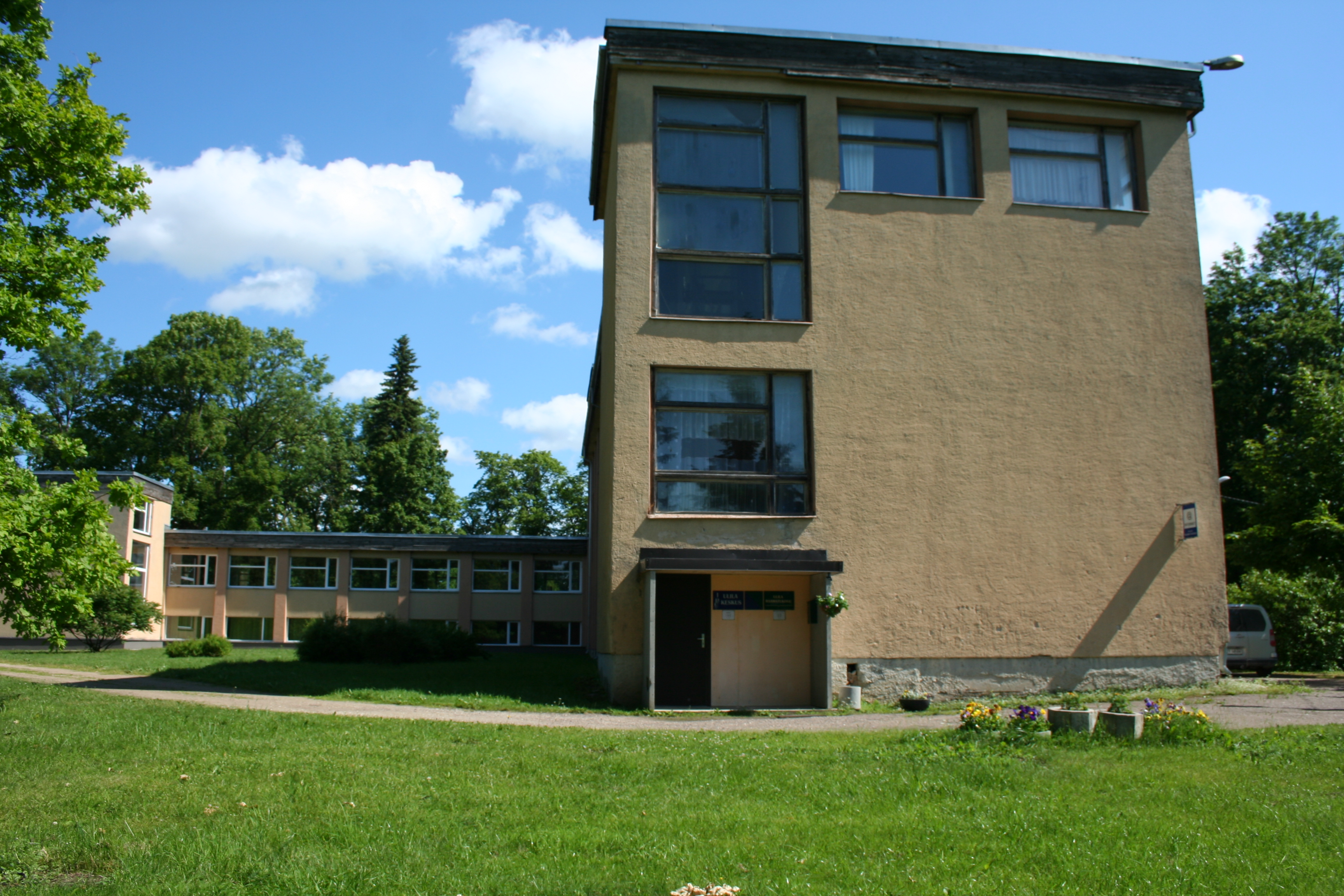
- Ulila library

- Location in Estonia
- Coordinates: 58°21′49″N 26°25′53″E
- Country: Estonia
- County: Tartu County
- Municipality: Elva Parish

Population (01.01.2010)
  - Total: 319
- Time zone: UTC+2 (EET)
  - Summer (DST): UTC+3 (EEST)

Ulila (German: Ullila) is a small borough (Estonian: alevik) in Elva Parish, Tartu County, Estonia. It has a population of 319 (as of 1 January 2010).
