= Mõisanurme =

Village in Estonia

- Village
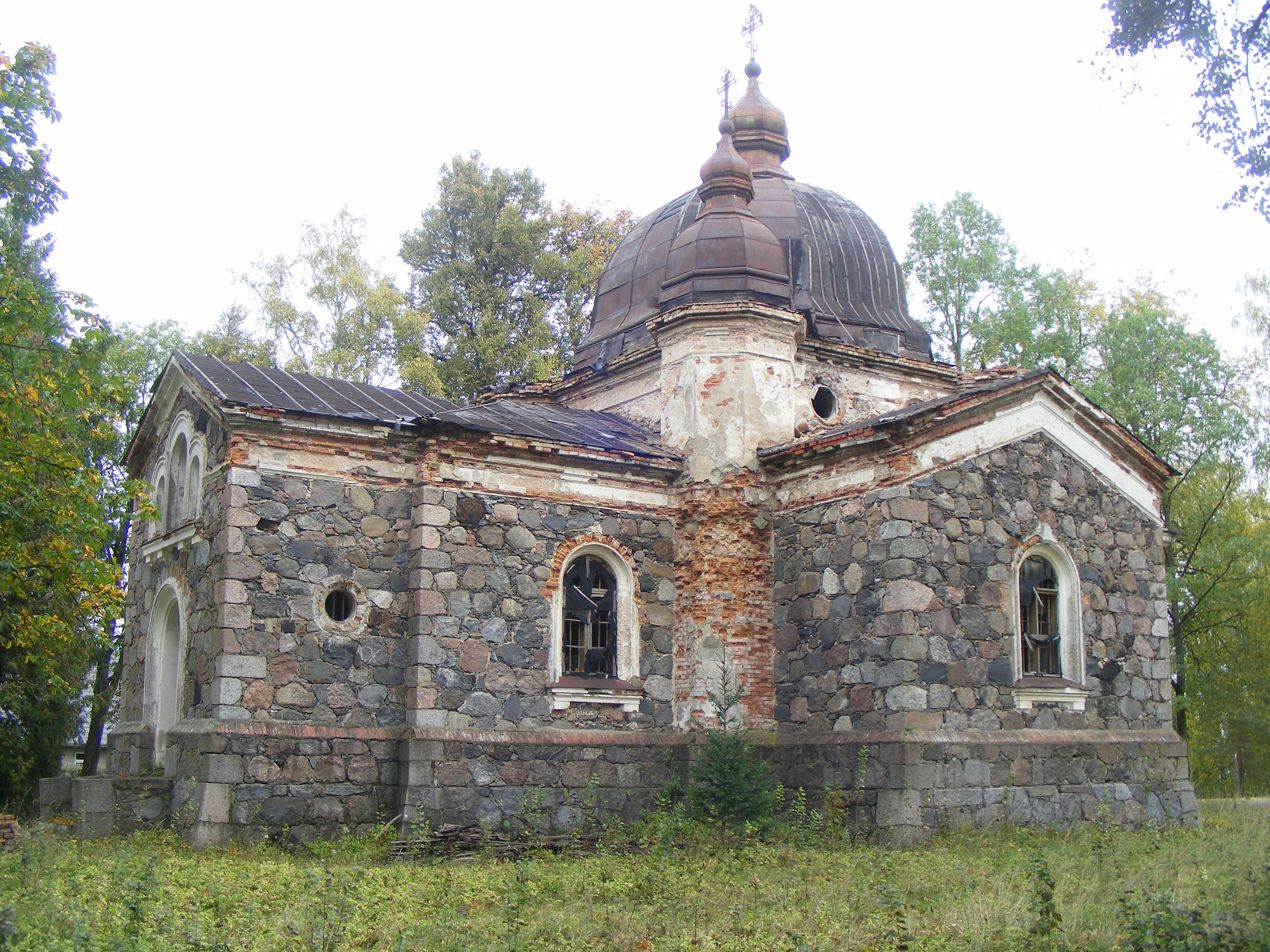
- Kavilda church

- Location in Estonia
- Coordinates: 58°20′19″N 26°20′50″E
- Country: Estonia
- County: Tartu County
- Municipality: Elva Parish

Population (01.01.2012)
  - Total: 198

Mõisanurme is a village in Elva Parish, Tartu County, Estonia. It has a population of 198 (as of 1 January 2012).

The ruins of Kavilda stronghold is located in Mõisanurme. There's also Kavilda St. Alexander's Orthodox church.
