= Rannaküla, Tartu County =

Village in Estonia

Rannaküla
- Village
- Location in Estonia
- Coordinates: 58°11′47″N 26°06′01″E
- Country: Estonia
- County: Tartu County
- Municipality: Elva Parish

Population (01.01.2005)
  - Total: 65

Rannaküla is a village in Elva Parish, Tartu County in southern Estonia. It has a population of 65 (as of 1 January 2005).

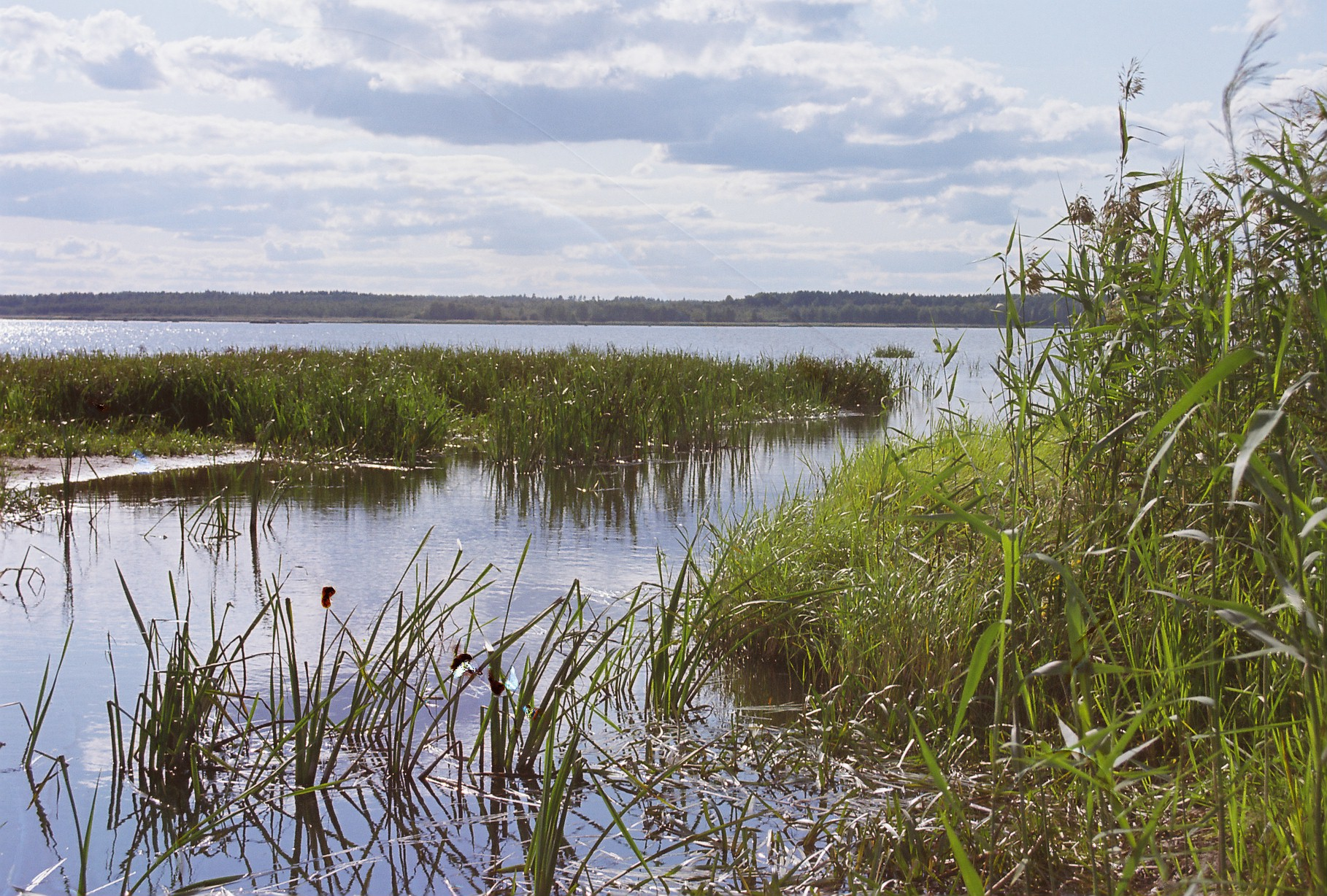
Mouth of Rõngu River into Lake Võrtsjärv in Rannaküla.
