= Tilga, Tartu County =

Village in Estonia

Tilga
- Village
- Location in Estonia
- Coordinates: 58°09′19″N 26°16′40″E
- Country: Estonia
- County: Tartu County
- Municipality: Elva Parish

Population (2006)
  - Total: 127

Tilga is a village in Elva Parish, Tartu County in southern Estonia. It has a population of 127 (as of 2006).
