= Kaarlijärve =

Village in Estonia

- Village
- Location within Estonia
- Coordinates: 58.283888888889°N 26.163888888889°E
- Country: Estonia
- County: Tartu County
- Parish: Elva Parish
- Time zone: UTC+2 (EET)
  - Summer (DST): UTC+3 (EEST)

Kaarlijärve is a village in Elva Parish, Tartu County in Estonia.
