= Käärdi =

Borough in Estonia

- Location within Estonia
- Coordinates: 58°12′29″N 26°24′41″E
- Country: Estonia
- County: Tartu County
- Municipality: Elva Parish
- Time zone: UTC+2 (EET)
  - Summer (DST): UTC+3 (EEST)

Käärdi is a small borough (alevik) in Elva Parish, Tartu County in eastern Estonia.
