= Ridaküla, Tartu County =

Village in Estonia

Ridaküla
- Village
- Location in Estonia
- Coordinates: 58°21′10″N 26°26′11″E
- Country: Estonia
- County: Tartu County
- Municipality: Elva Parish

Population (01.01.2010)
  - Total: 51

Ridaküla is a village in Elva Parish, Tartu County, Estonia. It has a population of 51 (as of 1 January 2010).
