= Kipastu =

Village in Estonia

- Village
- Location within Estonia
- Coordinates: 58.2175°N 26.193333333333°E
- Country: Estonia
- County: Tartu County
- Parish: Elva Parish
- Time zone: UTC+2 (EET)
  - Summer (DST): UTC+3 (EEST)

Kipastu is a village in Elva Parish, Tartu County in Estonia.
