= Võsivere =

Village in Estonia

- Village
- Location within Estonia
- Coordinates: 58.338055555556°N 26.424444444444°E
- Country: Estonia
- County: Tartu County
- Parish: Elva Parish
- Time zone: UTC+2 (EET)
  - Summer (DST): UTC+3 (EEST)

Võsivere is a village in Elva Parish, Tartu County in Estonia.
