= Teilma, Tartu County =

Village in Estonia

Teilma
- Village
- Location in Estonia
- Coordinates: 58°22′27″N 26°23′44″E
- Country: Estonia
- County: Tartu County
- Municipality: Elva Parish

Population (01.01.2010)
  - Total: 42

Teilma is a village in Elva Parish, Tartu County, Estonia. It has a population of 42 (as of 1 January 2010).
