= Kolga-Jaani Parish =

Former municipality of Estonia

Coordinates: 58°32′1″N 25°56′40″E

Kolga-Jaani Parish Kolga-Jaani vald
- Municipality of Estonia
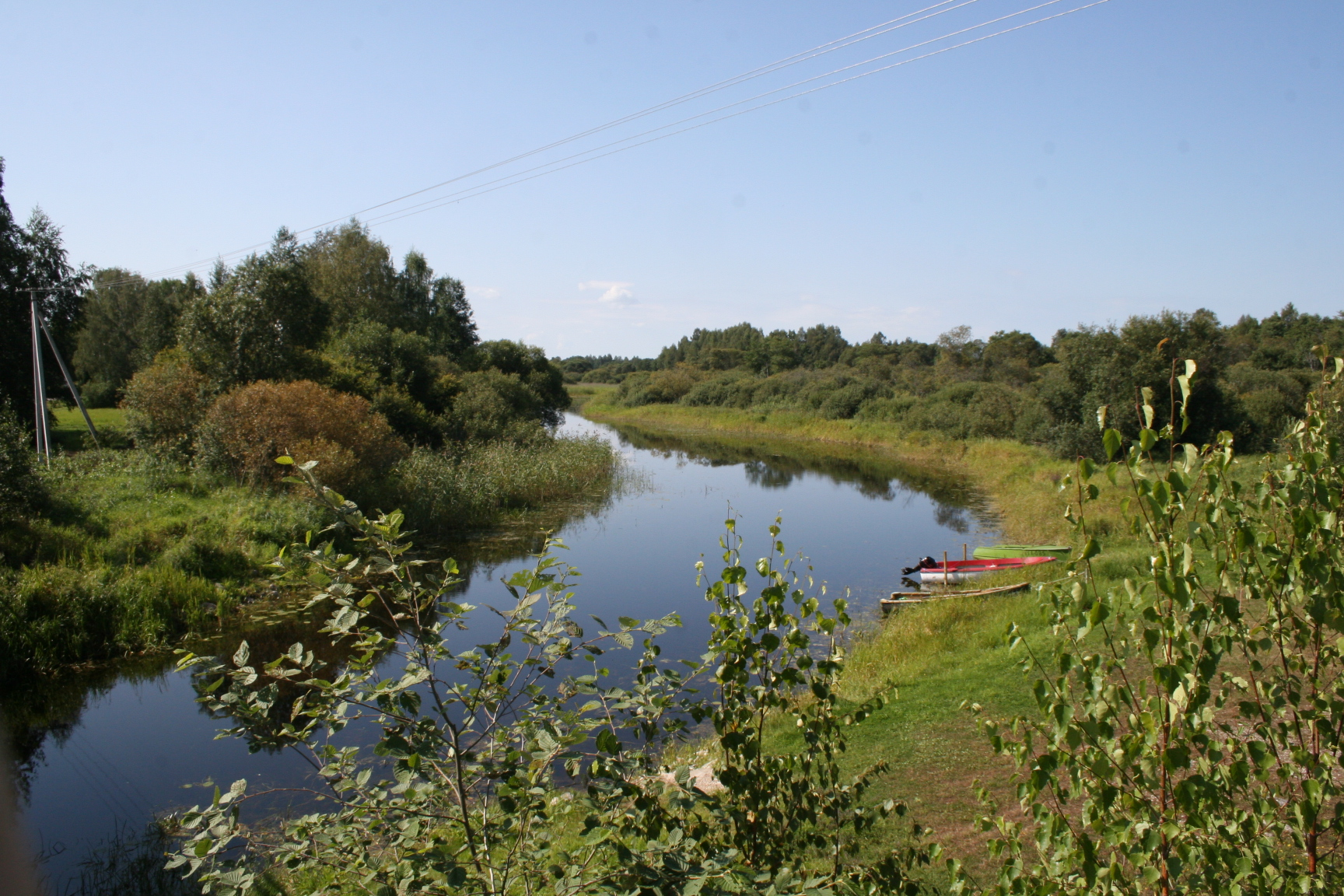
- Tänassilma river

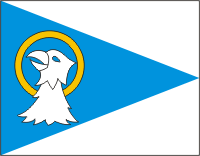
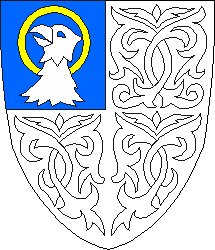
- Flag Coat of arms

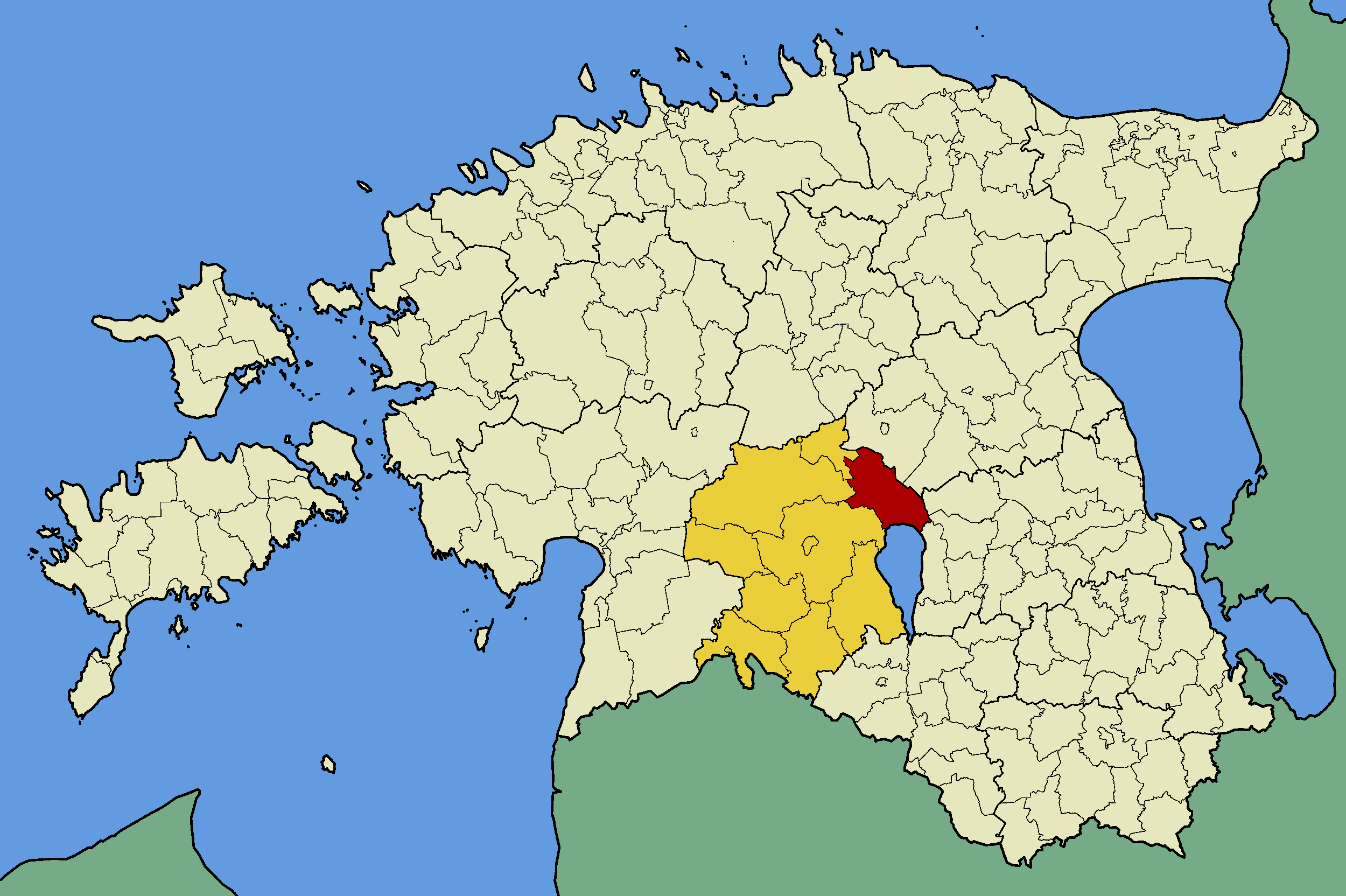
- Kolga-Jaani Parish within Viljandi County.
- Country: Estonia
- County: Viljandi County
- Administrative centre: Kolga-Jaani

Area
  - Total: 312.35 km^{2} (120.60 sq mi)

Population (01.01.2009)
  - Total: 1,668
  - Density: 5.340/km^{2} (13.83/sq mi)

Kolga-Jaani Parish (Estonian: Kolga-Jaani vald) was a rural municipality of Estonia, in Viljandi County. It had a population of 1,668 (as of 1 January 2009) and an area of 312.35 km².

== Settlements ==
Small borough

Kolga-Jaani

Villages

Eesnurga - Järtsaare - Kaavere - Lalsi - Lätkalu - Leie - Meleski - Oiu - Otiküla - Odiste - Oorgu - Parika - Taganurga - Vaibla - Vissuvere

== Gallery ==
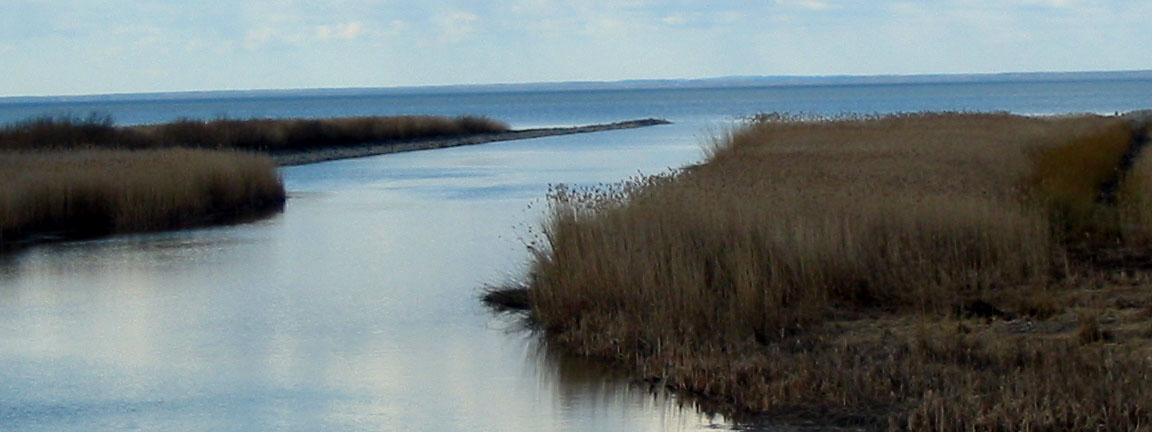
Lake Võrtsjärv drains into Emajõgi near Vaibla.

== St. John's Church ==
The Church of St. John in Kolga-Jaani. It was built in the Gothic style in the 14th century and renovated in 1742. A tower was added in 1875. During the extensive renovation in 1903/04, it received impressive stained glass windows.
