= Purtsi =

Village in Estonia

- Village
- Location in Estonia
- Coordinates: 58°05′15″N 26°05′07″E
- Country: Estonia
- County: Valga County
- Municipality: Elva Parish

Population (2011 Census)
  - Total: 34

Purtsi is a village in Elva Parish, Valga County in southern Estonia. It's located east of the end of the Väike-Emajõgi River, before it drains into the Lake Võrtsjärv. Viljandi–Rõngu road (nr 52) crosses the Väike-Emajõgi on a 120-meter-long (390 ft) bridge in between Purtsi and Pikasilla. As of the 2011 census, the village's population was 34.
