= Lalsi =

Village in Estonia

- village
- Location in Estonia
- Coordinates: 58°28′17″N 26°03′01″E
- Country: Estonia
- County: Viljandi County
- Municipality: Viljandi Parish

Lalsi is a village in Viljandi Parish, Viljandi County, in central Estonia. It's located about 7 km (4 mi) southeast of Kolga-Jaani.

The Põltsamaa River passes through Lalsi on its northeastern side, the territory behind the river is occupied by the Alam-Pedja Nature Reserve.

Lalsi is home to Kolga-Jaani St. Nicholas Orthodox Church, which was built in 1872.
