= Varangu =

Varangu may refer to several places in Estonia:

- Varangu, Haljala Parish, village in Lääne-Viru County, Estonia
- Varangu, Väike-Maarja Parish, village in Lääne-Viru County, Estonia
