= Vissuvere =

Vissuvere may refer to several places in Estonia:

- Vissuvere, Järva County, village in Türi Parish, Järva County
- Vissuvere, Viljandi County, village in Viljandi Parish, Viljandi County
