= OIU =

OIU or Oiu may refer to:

- Oiu, Estonia, a village
- Okan International University, Dania Beach, Florida, United States
- Omdurman Islamic University, Omdurman, Sudan
- Osaka International University, Osaka, Japan
- Okpofe Improvement Union, an association in Okpofe, Nigeria
