= Peet Aren =

Estonian painter and theatre artist (1889–1970)

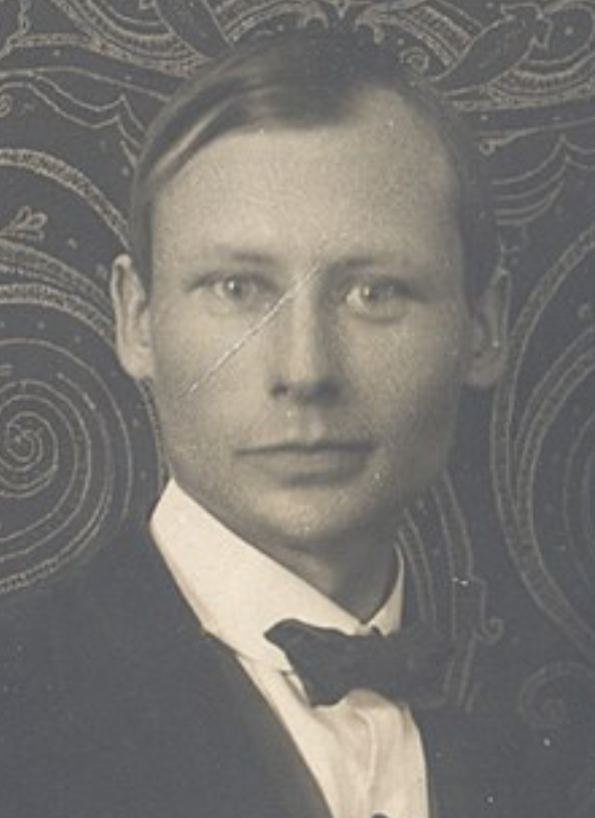
Aren in 1917

Peet Aren (29 June 1889 – 26 January 1970) was an Estonian painter, theatre artist and graphic artist.

== Biography ==
Aren was born on 29 June 1889, in Odiste. From 1908 to 1913, he studied at the Society for the Encouragement of Artists in St. Petersburg. From 1920 to 1925, he was a teacher at the State Industrial Art School in Tallinn. From 1926 to 1930, he taught at the Pallas Art School in Tartu.

In the 1930s, he worked mainly as a graphic artist.

He designed the emblem of the Estonian Drama Theatre. He is also designed the Cross of Liberty.

In 1944, he escaped to Germany, living in New York City from 1949 until his death on 26 January 1970, aged 80.
