= Pedja (river) =

River in Estonia

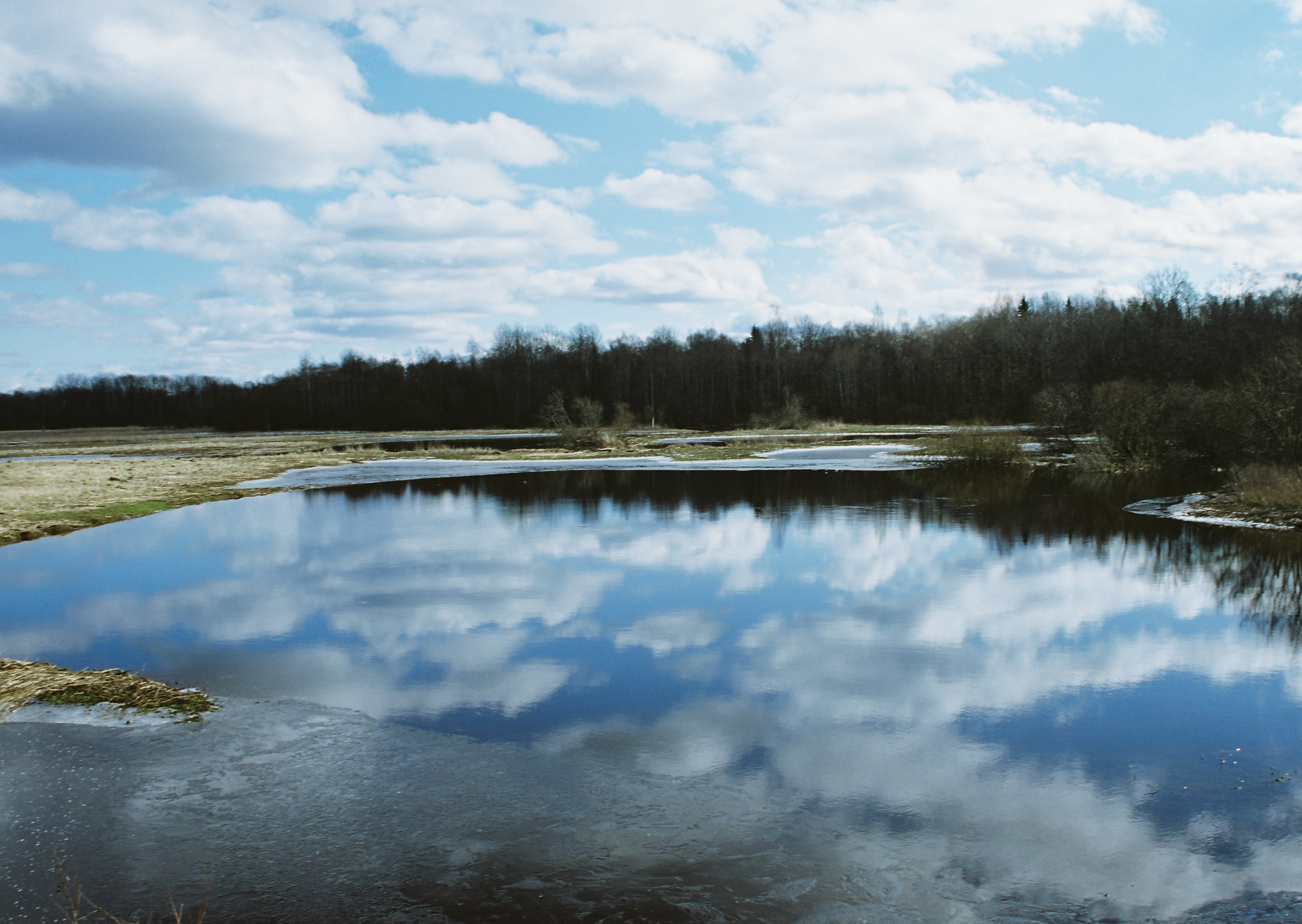
- The Pedja in spring

Location
- Country: Estonia

Physical characteristics
- Source
  - location: Simuna, Lääne-Viru County
- Mouth: Emajõgi
  - coordinates: 58°24′47″N 26°11′28″E
  - elevation: 33 m (108 ft)
- Length: 122 km (76 mi)
- Basin size: 2,719 km^{2} (1,050 sq mi)
- Discharge
  - average: 10.9 m^{3}/s (380 cu ft/s)

Basin features
- Progression: Emajõgi→ Lake Peipus→ Narva→ Gulf of Finland

Drone video of headwaters of Pedja river in Simuna (July 2022)

The Pedja (Estonian: Pedja jõgi) is the fourth longest river in Estonia. Its source is near Simuna on the southern slopes of the Pandivere Upland. The river flows for 122 km through Lääne-Viru, Jõgeva and Tartu counties before joining the Emajõgi northeast of Lake Võrtsjärv. The last 4 km section of the river after confluence with Põltsamaa is known as the Pede. The largest settlement on the river is Jõgeva.

The Pedja is also the origin of the name of Alam-Pedja Nature Reserve, a large protected area on the river's lower reaches.

== Tributaries ==
- Kaave
