= August Annist =

Estonian writer, folklorist, and translator

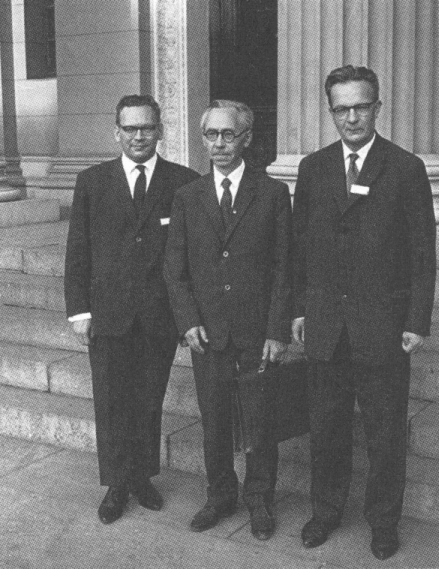
Ülo Tedre, August Annist (centre), and Matti Kuusi in 1965

August Annist (until 1936 August Anni; 28 January 1899 Leie, Võisiku Parish – 6 April 1972 Tallinn) was an Estonian literary and folklore scholar, writer, and translator.

Annist is regarded as the doctor of modern folklore. In 1920, he was one of the founders of the student organization Veljesto. From 1918 until 1924, he studied at University of Tartu. From 1924 until 1927, he studied under scholarship in Helsinki, Bonn, and the University of Paris. During the 1920s and 1930s, he also wrote on the topic of the Estonian national culture. Most of his work during this time was published in student-organized periodicals. Annist graduated from the University of Tartu with a double master's degree in Estonian language and literature. Annist participated in the Estonian War of Independence. Annist viewed independence for Estonia as a way to develop independent culture for the country. He hoped to orient Estonia towards the democratic traditions of the Nordic countries.

From 1929 until 1945, he taught at the University of Tartu and was a docent starting in 1938. From 1932 until 1940, he edited the book series Elav teadus. From 1945 until 1951, he was in prison in Valga and Harku camp. From 1958 to 1971, he worked at the Estonian SSR Academy of Sciences' Institute of Language and Literature.

== Works ==
- "Kalevala" kui kunstiteos. Tartu Eesti Kirjastus 1944
- Friedrich Reinhold Kreutzwaldi muinasjuttude algupära ja kunstiline laad. Eesti Raamat, Tallinn 1966
- Noorusmaa (collection of articles). Compiled by Hando Runnel. Ilmamaa, Tartu 2011
