= Friedrich Amelung =

Baltic German chess player and historian

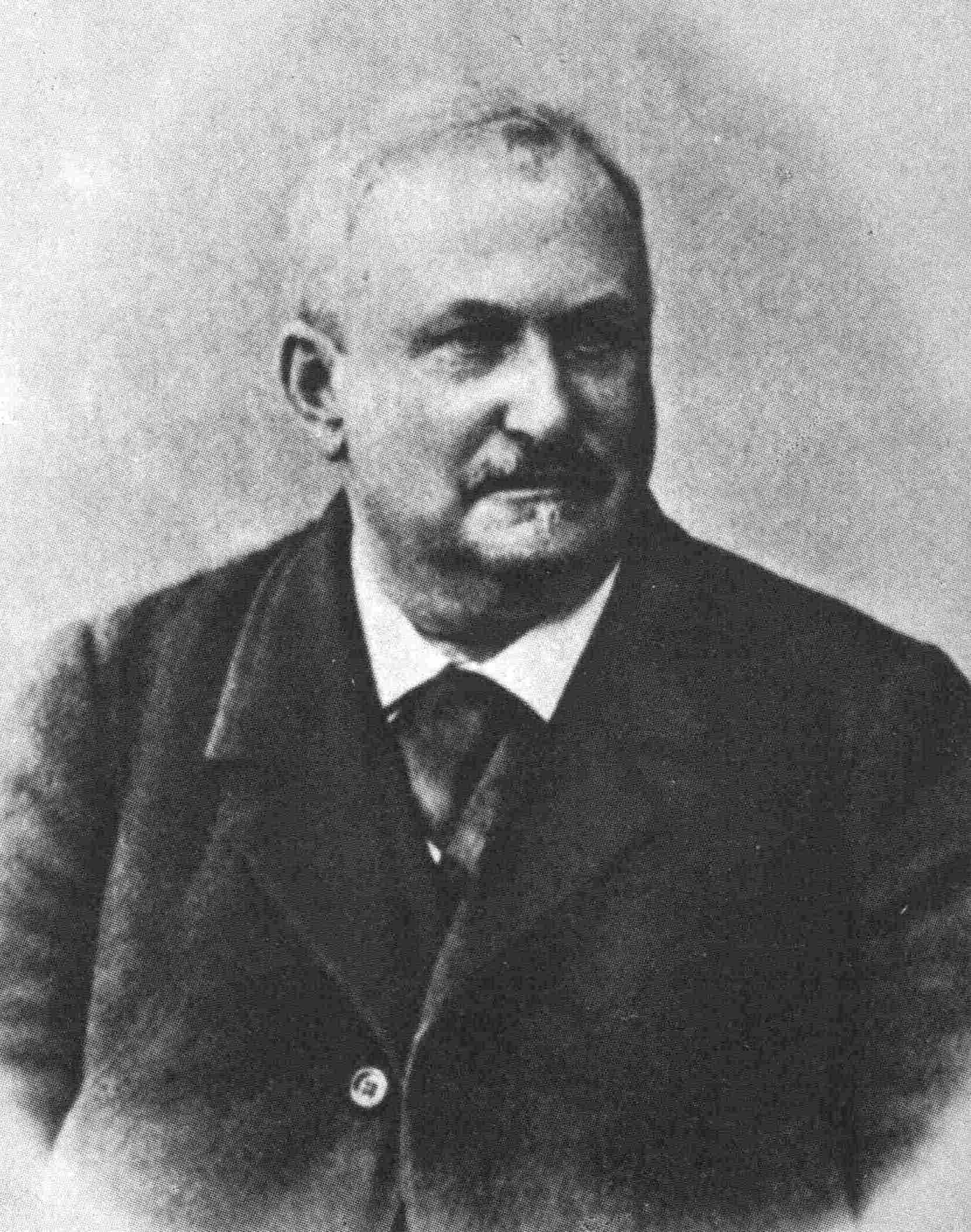
Amelung, c. 1880

Friedrich Ludwig Balthasar Amelung (23 March [O.S. 11 March] 1842 – 20 March [O.S. 7 March] 1909) was a Baltic German cultural historian, businessman and chess endgame composer.

Amelung was born at Võisiku (German: Woiseck) manor in Governorate of Livonia of the Russian Empire (present-day Jõgeva County in Estonia). 1862–1864 he studied philosophy and chemistry at the Imperial University of Dorpat. From 1864 to 1879 and from 1885 to 1902 he was the director of the Rõika-Meleski mirror factory, which he inherited from his father. Amelung published writings about the culture and history of Estonian localities such as Viljandi, Tallinn, and Põltsamaa.

Amelung was known as a chess player and a famous chess quiz author. From 1879 to 1885 he lived in Reval (now Tallinn) and studied the chess history of the Baltics. Between 1888 and 1908 he edited the chess magazine Baltische Schachblätter. In 1898 he established the Baltic Chess Society. Amelung published about 230 endgame studies, making him the first chess historian in the Baltic States.

He played a few games with Adolf Anderssen, Gustav Neumann, Carl Mayet, Emil Schallopp, Andreas Ascharin, and Emanuel Schiffers.

He died in 1909 in Riga and is buried at the Kolga-Jaani cemetery in Estonia.

== Sources ==
- "Амелунг, Фридрих" . Brockhaus and Efron Encyclopedic Dictionary (in Russian). 1906.
