= Alam-Pedja Nature Reserve =

Protected area in Estonia

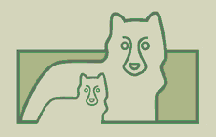

- Location within Estonia
- Location: Estonia
- Nearest city: Tartu
- Coordinates: 58°28′26″N 26°10′11″E
- Area: 342 km^{2} (85,000 acres)
- Established: 1994

Ramsar Wetland
- Official name: Alam-Pedja
- Designated: 17 June 1997
- Reference no.: 905

Alam-Pedja Nature Reserve (Estonian: Alam-Pedja looduskaitseala) is the largest nature reserve in Estonia. It is a vast wilderness area which covers 342 km^{2} (85,000 acres) and consists of a complex of 5 large bogs separated by unregulated rivers, their floodplains, and extensive forests. The nature reserve aims to protect diverse ecosystems and rare species, mainly through preserving the natural development of forests and bogs and securing the continuing management of semi-natural floodplain grasslands.

Alam-Pedja is situated in Central Estonia northeast of Lake Võrtsjärv, in a lowland area called the Võrtsjärv Basin. It spans over three counties - Tartu, Jõgeva and Viljandi. The area has an especially low density of human population, comparable to that of wolf, bear and lynx. The nature reserve was established in 1994. It is recognized as a wetland of international importance under the Ramsar Convention and since 2004 it is a designated Natura 2000 site.

The name Alam-Pedja, translating as Lower-Pedja, comes from the nature reserve's location on the lower reaches of the Pedja River.

== History ==
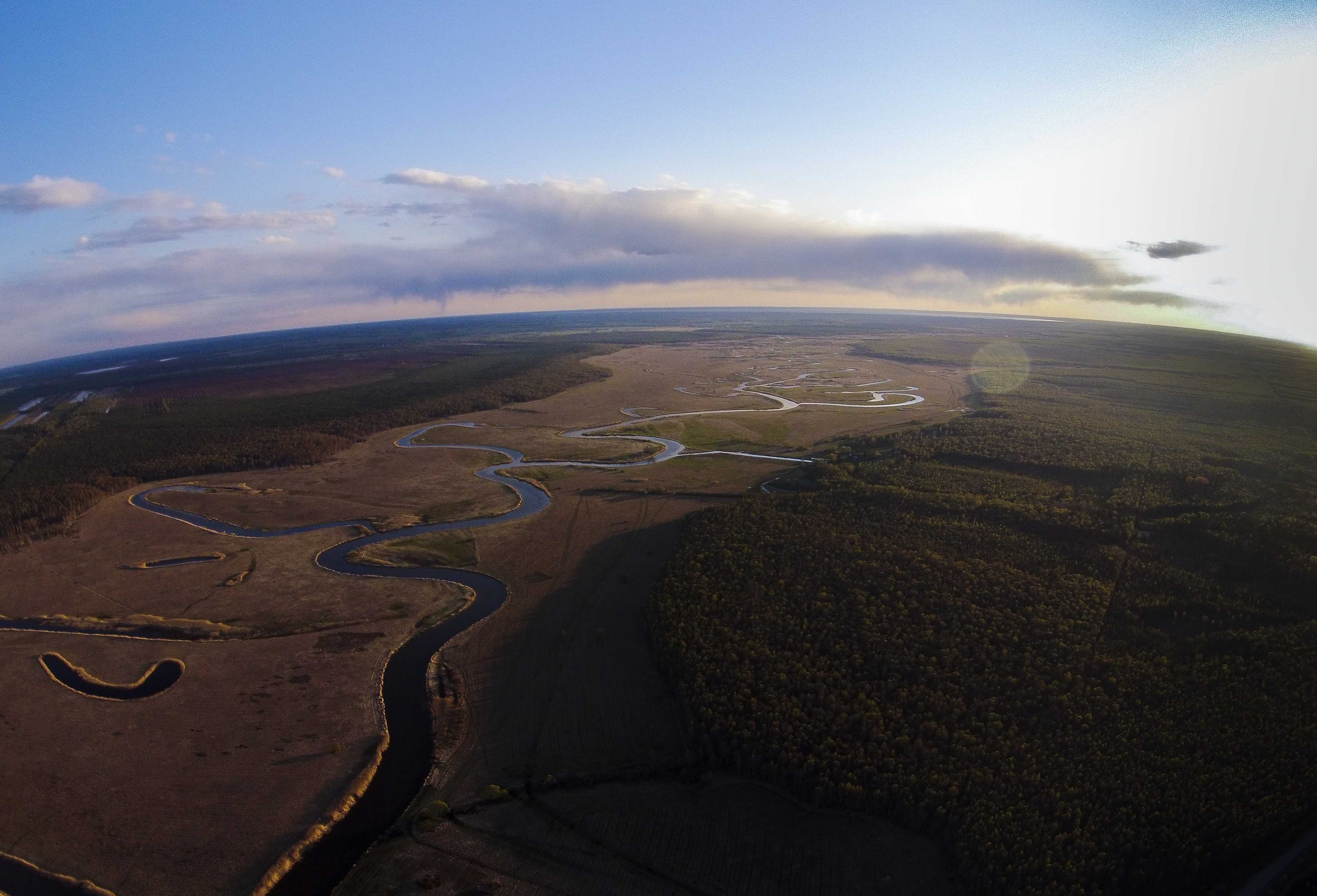
Alam-Pedja Nature Reserve from air

The first human inhabitants came to the area of the present nature reserve in the Stone Age. Permanent settlements were established on the shores of Lake Big Võrtsjärv, predecessor of the current lake, which covered large lowland areas to the north and northeast. Fishing was the main occupation which attracted inhabitants to this area for centuries.

Human activities influenced the area most in the 19th century, when interest in using its natural resources (mainly wood and fish) grew significantly. The main driver behind exploiting the large forests of the area was glass industry, which needed huge amounts of firewood. The first glass workshop was established in Utsali in 1760. In the beginning of 19th century the Võisiku or Rõika-Meleski glass and mirror manufacture on the banks of Põltsamaa River near the western border of the current nature reserve was the largest industrial enterprise in Estonia, employing around 540 people in 1820. After the First World War the majority of glass factories were shut down and intensive forest cutting stopped.

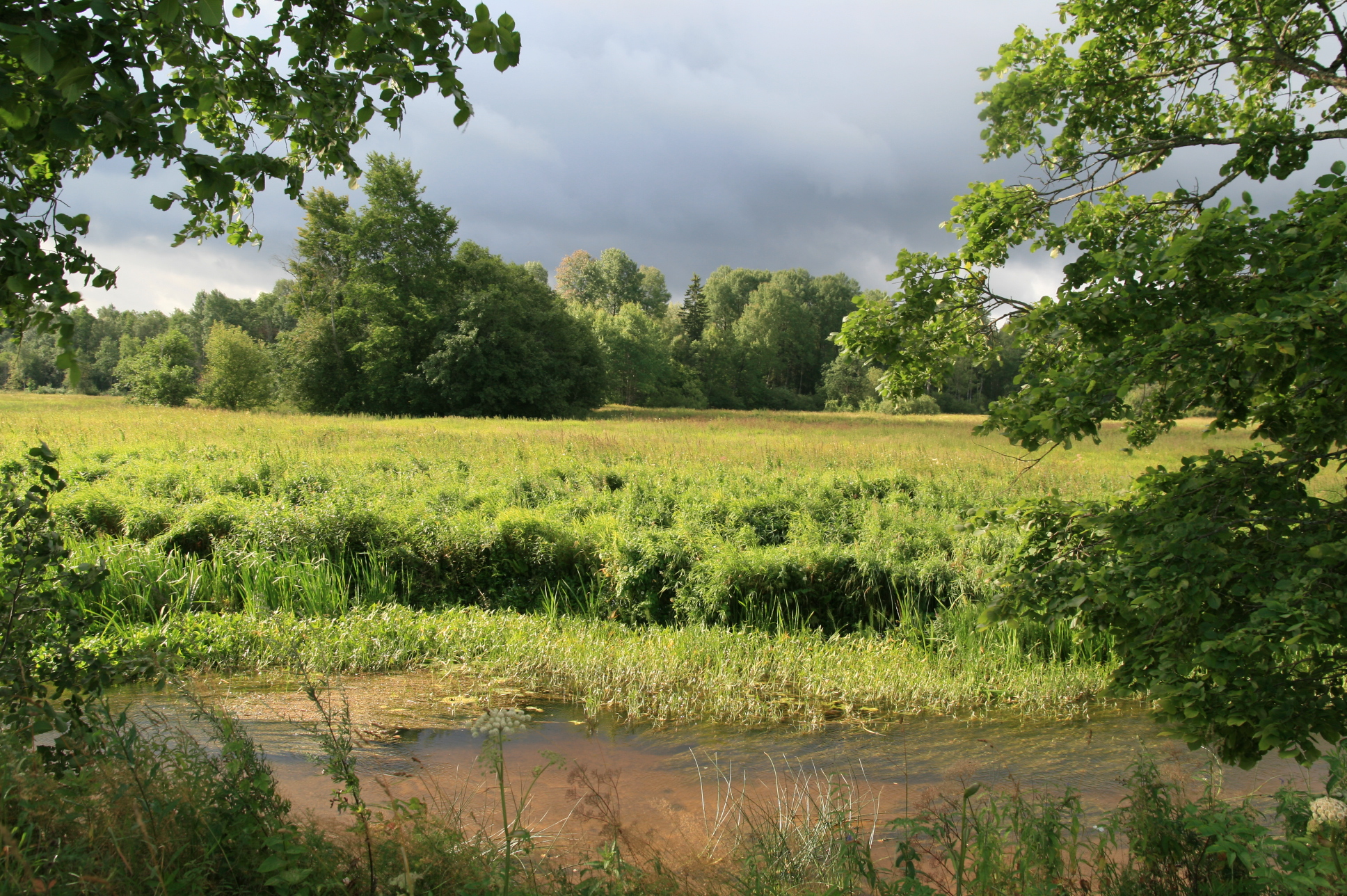
Floodplain of the Pedja River near Kirna

From 1952 to 1992 Soviet Air Force managed a relatively small bombing range in the northern part of the area. The small village of Utsali was cleared of people for that purpose. The large buffer zone of the bombing range, covering nearly half of the territory of today's nature reserve, ensured the protection of the natural landscape.

The nature reserve was officially established in 1994 with the help of Estonian Fund for Nature. In 1997 it was included in the Ramsar list of wetlands of international importance and since 2004 it is part of the European Union Natura 2000 network.

Currently the nature reserve has less than 10 permanent inhabitants, and no roads traverse the area. Before the Second World War, 120 people lived in Palupõhja, a village on the left bank of Emajõgi; in 2001, it had five.

== Nature ==
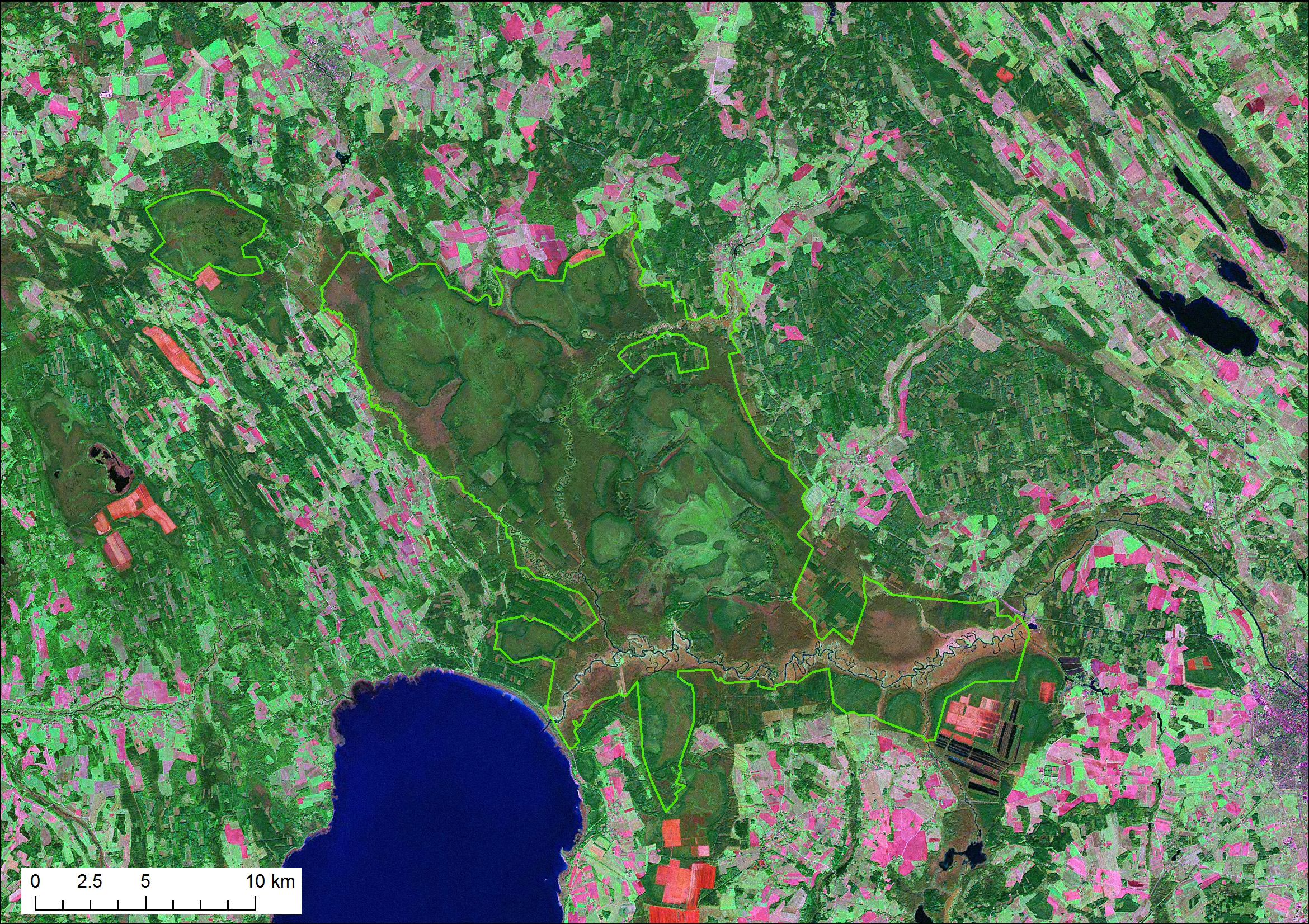
Satellite image of Alam-Pedja

Alam-Pedja Nature Reserve covers large portion of the Võrtsjärv Basin, a vast bowl-like lowland area, which following the last Ice Age was inundated by the waters of Lake Big Võrtsjärv. When the lake formed in early Holocene the water level was 4–5 m higher than today. The lake started receding after 7500 BP, when an outflow to the east developed via the Emajõgi Valley.

The nature reserve is largely a wetland, including a complex of five large bogs and floodplains of the large rivers (Emajõgi, Põltsamaa and Pedja). Wetlands cover 82% of the nature reserve's territory. The only types of lakes found in the nature reserve are oxbow lakes and more than 2000 bog pools. Many floodplain meadows have traditionally used for haymaking. However, in recent decades the extent of floodplains mowed has greatly decreased, threatening species associated with such valuable semi-natural landscapes. Continuing management of floodplain meadows is one of the main aims of the nature reserve.

Most of the forest in Alam-Pedja are also wet. Alluvial broadleaf and old-growth forests are particularly valuable.

Alam-Pedja is the most important breeding area for great snipe in Estonia and the Baltic countries. The greater spotted eagle is another threatened bird species breeding in the area.

== See also ==
- Protected areas of Estonia
- List of protected areas of Estonia
- List of Ramsar sites in Estonia
