= Meleski =

Village in Estonia

- village
- Location in Estonia
- Coordinates: 58°26′09″N 26°05′13″E
- Country: Estonia
- County: Viljandi County
- Municipality: Viljandi Parish

Population (01.01.2000)
  - Total: 137

Meleski is a village in Viljandi Parish, Viljandi County, in central Estonia. It is located about 3 km (2 mi) north of the Lake Võrtsjärv. According to Estonia Census 2000, the village had a population of 137.

Meleski is bordered by the Põltsamaa River to the northeast.

== Glass manufacturing ==
Meleski glass factory, Amelung & Co, has the longest history of glass factories in Estonia. It was founded in 1792–1795 by Carl Philip Amelung and his father Anton Amelung who, fearing the French Revolution, escaped from the Grünenplan mirror factory in Braunschweig, Germany and travelled to Estonia.

Among the owners of the factory, there were the von Bocks who were closely related with the Russian czar court. Allegedly one of the von Bocks was the illegitimate son of Russian czar Peter I. Meleski glass factory was the biggest in the Baltic states during the 19th century, and only the Rjazan glass factory competed with Meleski for the title of the biggest glass factory in the Russian Empire.

1864–1902 Friedrich Amelung was the director of the factory.

Other Estonian glass manufactures such as Johannes Lorup's glass manufacture, Tarbeklaas, Scankristall and Glasstone were developed from Meleski glass factory. Glass production in Meleski was ceased in 2005 but the village contains the largest private glass museum in Estonia.
