= Tarvastu (river) =

River in Estonia

Tarvastu River
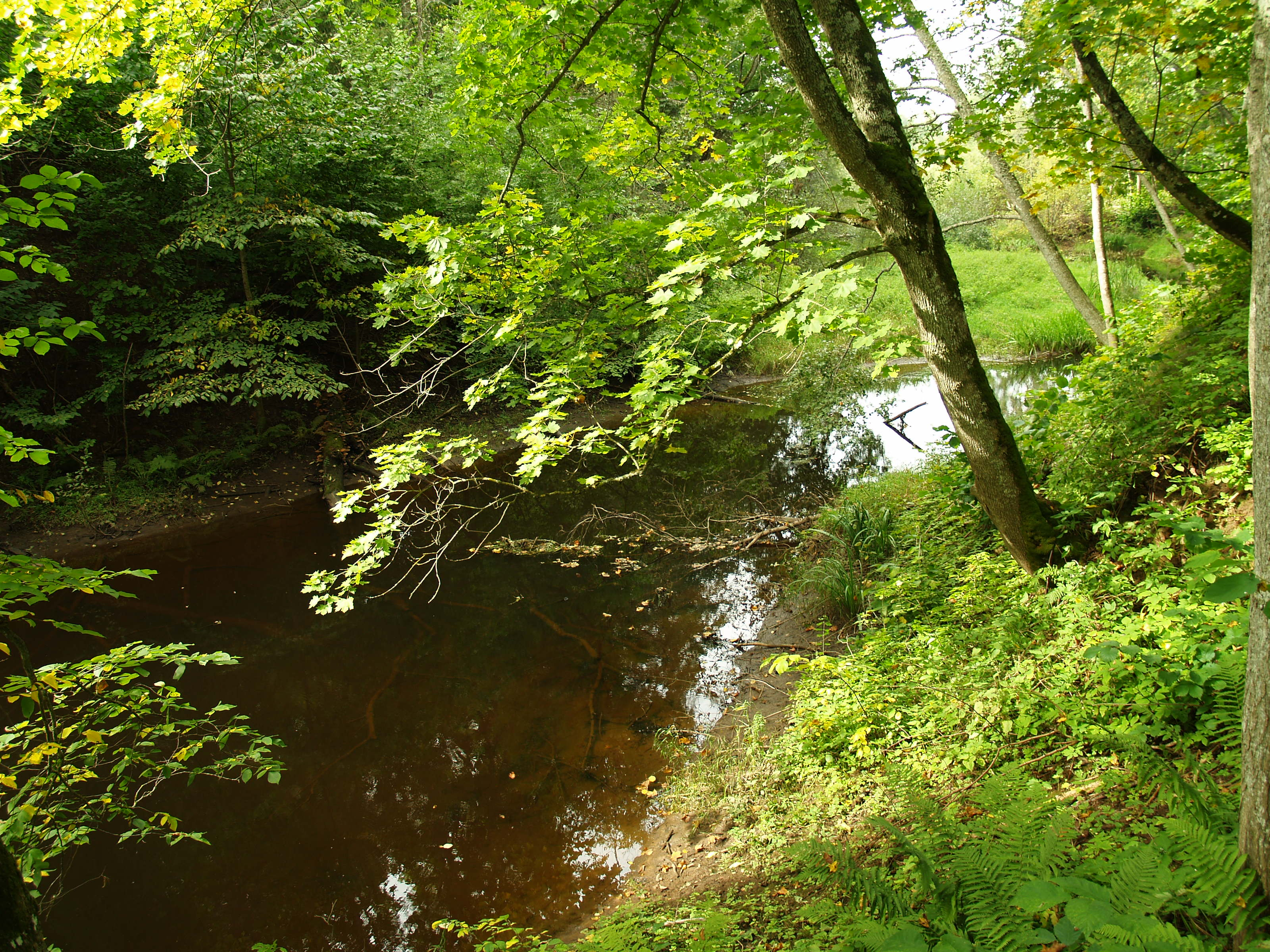

Location
- Country: Estonia

Physical characteristics
- Mouth: Lake Võrts
  - coordinates: 58°16′20″N 25°56′57″E
- Length: 26.9 km (16.7 mi)
- Basin size: 111.4 km^{2} (43.0 sq mi)

The Tarvastu River is a river in Viljandi County, Estonia. The river is 26.9 km long, and its basin size is 111.4 km^{2}. It discharges into Lake Võrts.
