= Rudolf Tihane =

Estonian weightlifter

Rudolf Tihane (2 December 1892 – 30 March 1977) was an Estonian weightlifter.

He was born in Palupõhja, Viljandi County.

He started his weightlifting exercising at the sport club Aberg, located in Tartu. 1922 he was a member of Estonian national weightlifting team. He won bronze medal at 1922 World Weightlifting Championships.

He is buried at Tallinn Forest Cemetery.
