= Järtsaare =

Village in Estonia

- village
- Location in Estonia
- Coordinates: 58°33′57″N 25°50′45″E
- Country: Estonia
- County: Viljandi County
- Municipality: Viljandi Parish

Population (01.01.2000)
  - Total: 87

Järtsaare is a village in Viljandi Parish, Viljandi County, in central Estonia. It's located about 6 km (4 mi) northwest of Kolga-Jaani. According to Estonia Census 2000, the village had a population of 87.

The northeastern half of the village territory is covered by Soosaare Bog.
