= Preedi (river) =

River in Estonia

Preedi River
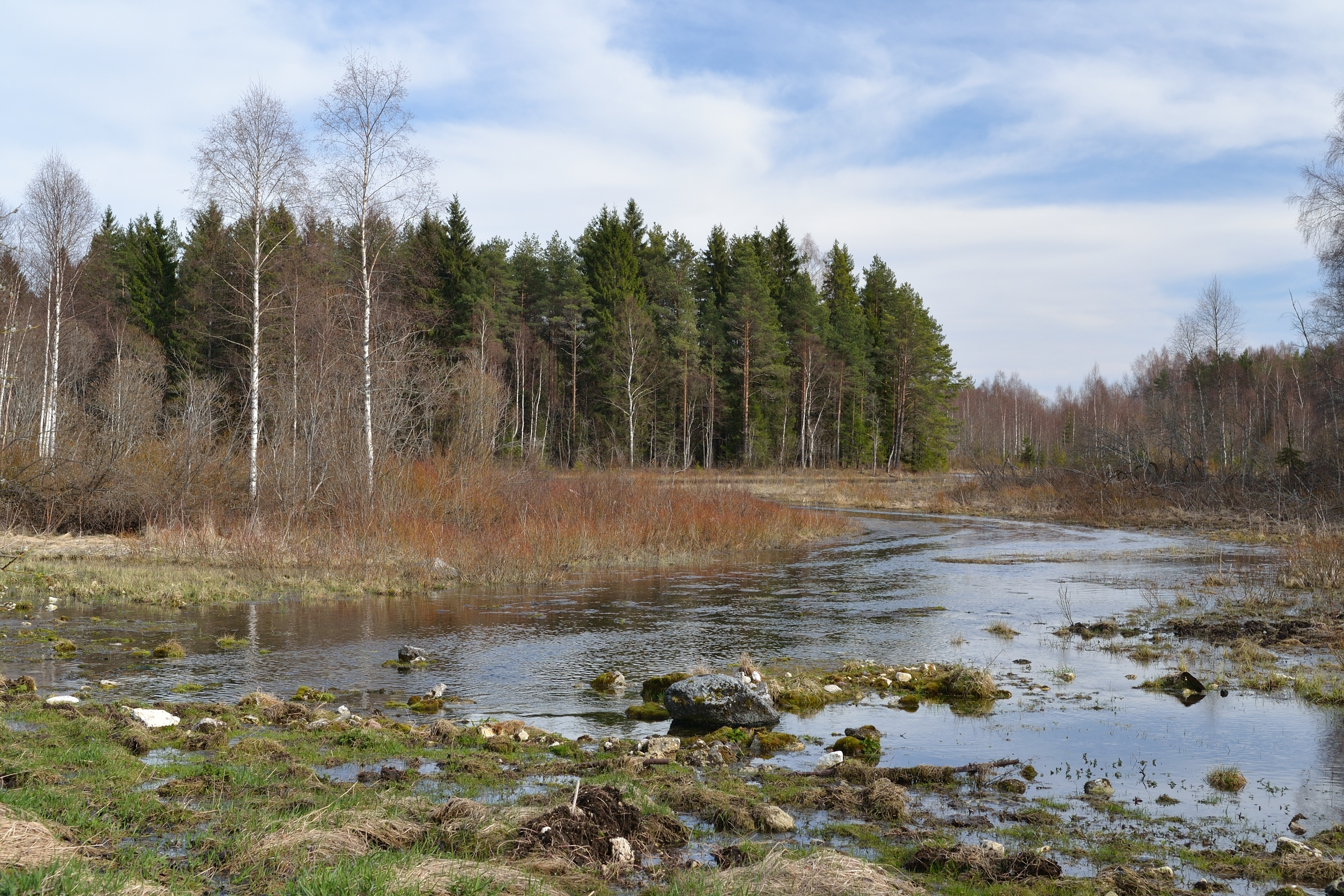

Location
- Country: Estonia

Physical characteristics
- Mouth: Põltsamaa River
  - coordinates: 58°52′51″N 26°06′47″E
- Length: 82.6 km (51.3 mi)
- Basin size: 291.5 km^{2} (112.5 sq mi)

The Preedi River is a river in Estonia in Järva and Lääne-Viru counties. The river is 82.6 km long, and its basin size is 291.5 km^{2}. It runs from Varangu Allikajärv to the Põltsamaa River.

Several species of fish can be found in the river, including trout and grayling.

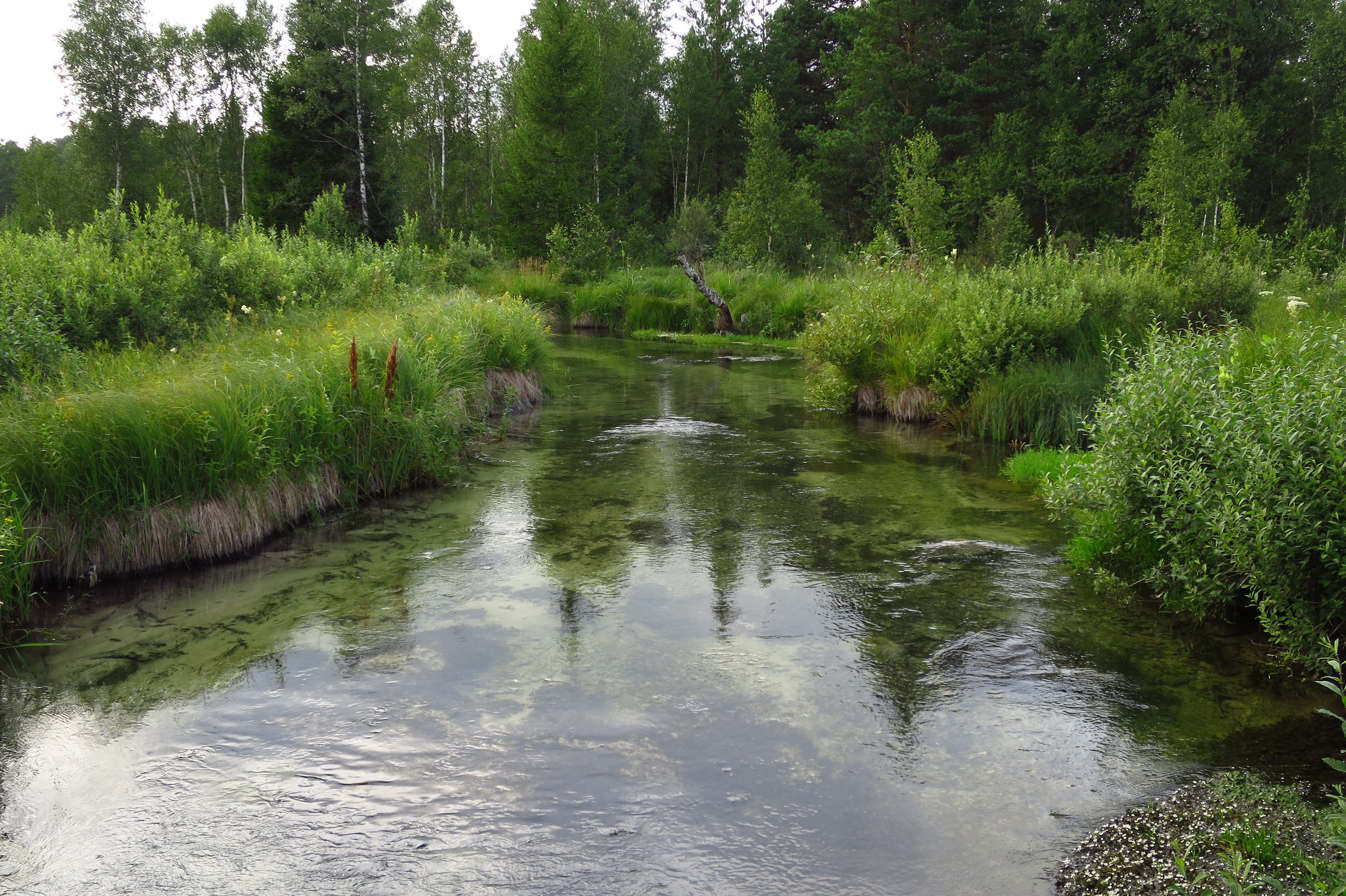
The Preedi River in Varangu
