= Pikasilla, Valga County =

Village in Estonia

Pikasilla
- Village
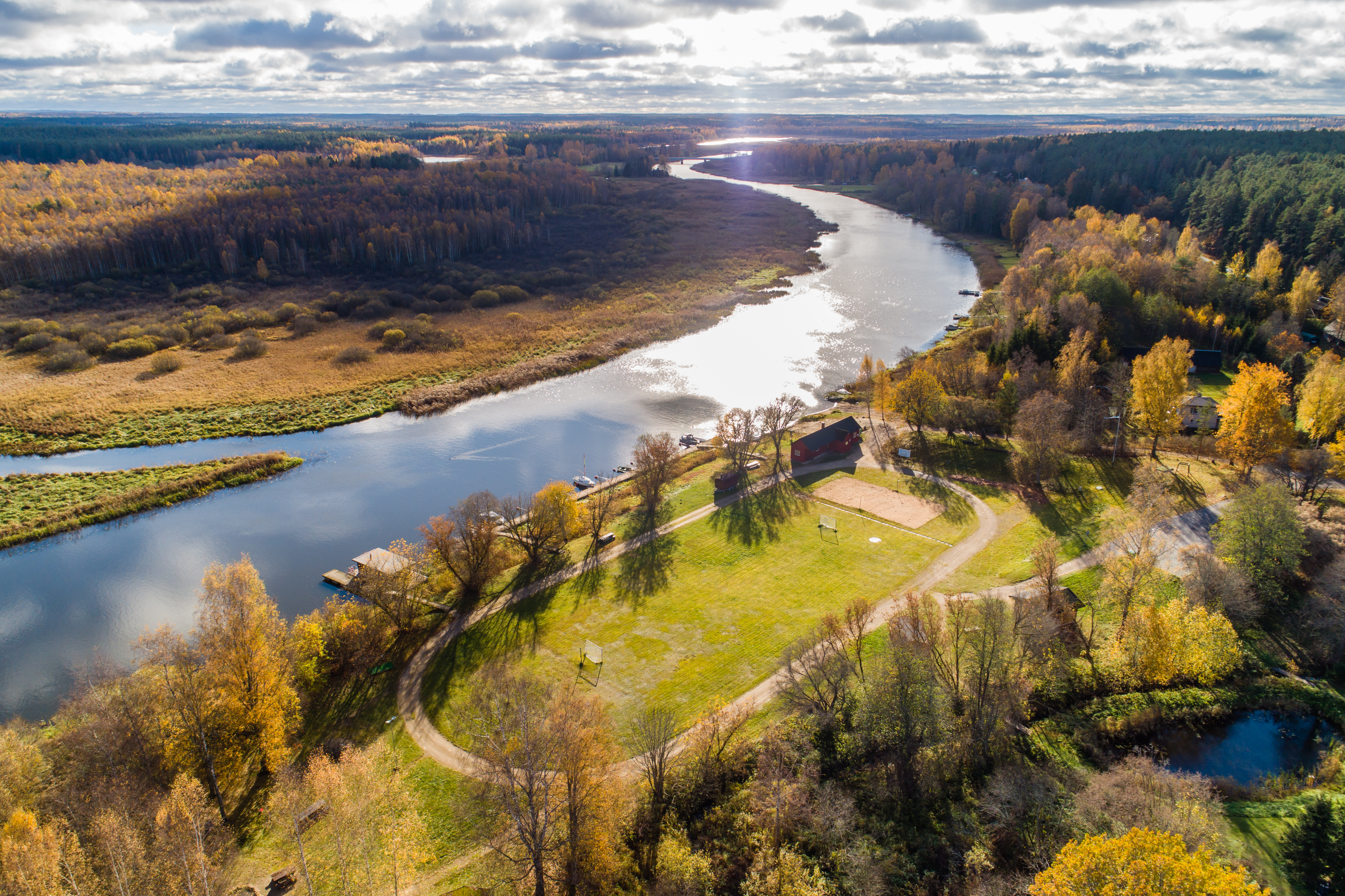
- Pikasilla stadium and the Väike Emajõgi river

- Location in Estonia
- Coordinates: 58°05′33″N 26°02′57″E
- Country: Estonia
- County: Valga County
- Municipality: Tõrva Parish

Population (01.01.2012)
  - Total: 92

Pikasilla is a village in Tõrva Parish, Valga County, in southern Estonia. It is located west of the end of the Väike-Emajõgi River, before it drains into Lake Võrtsjärv. The Viljandi–Rõngu road crosses the Väike-Emajõgi on a 120-metre-long (390 ft) bridge in Pikasilla, hence the name Pikasilla which literally means "long bridge's". Pikasilla has a population of 92 (as of 1 January 2012).
