= Kaave (river) =

River in Estonia

Kaave River
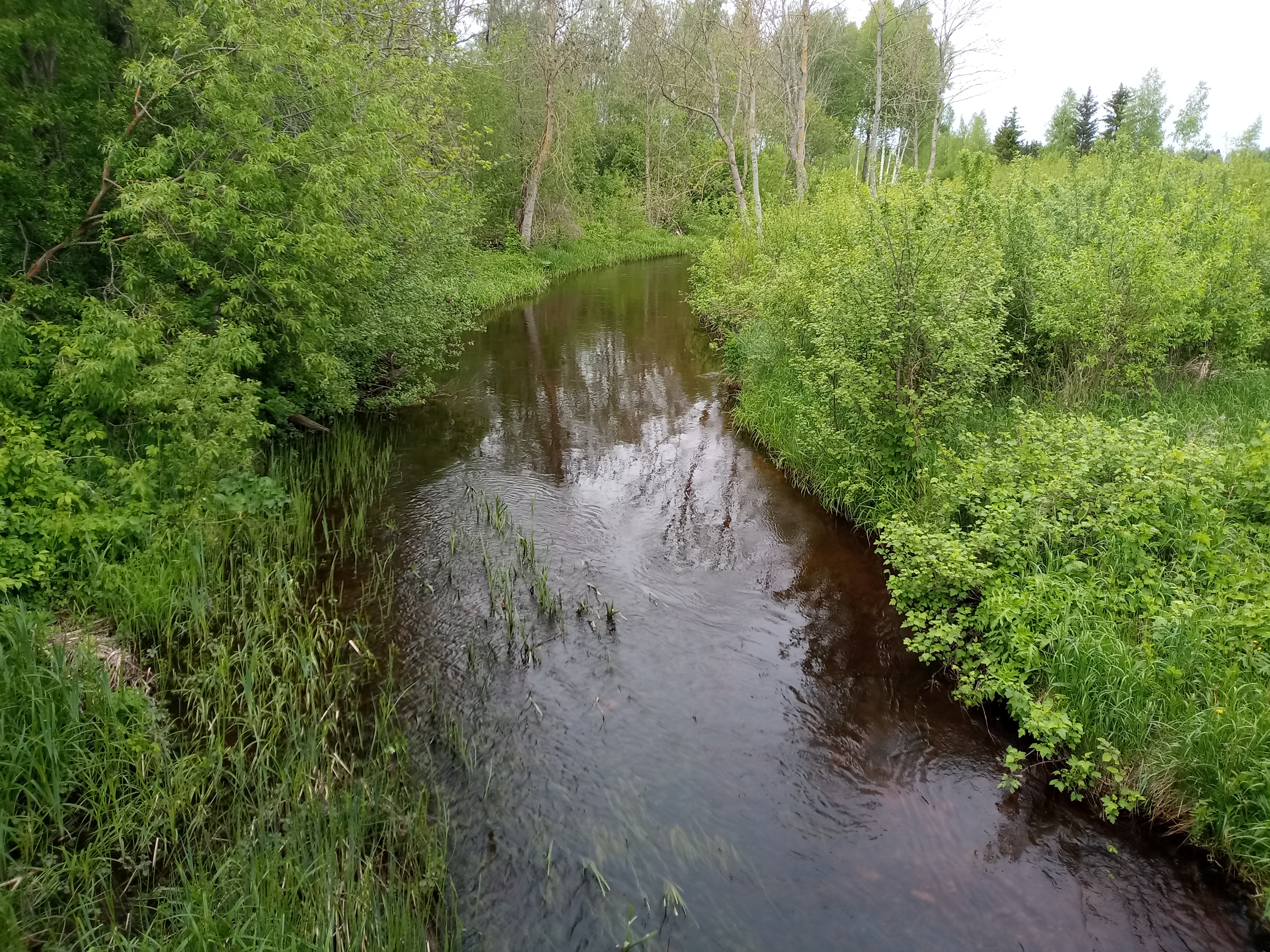

Location
- Country: Estonia

Physical characteristics
- Mouth: Pedja River
  - location: Puurmani
  - coordinates: 58°34′37″N 26°17′48″E
- Length: 41.8 km
- Basin size: 135.4 km²

The Kaave River is a river in Jõgeva County, Estonia. The river is 41.8 km long and its basin is 135.4 km^{2}. It discharges into the Pedja River.
