= Tondisaar =

Island in Võrtsjärv lake, Estonia

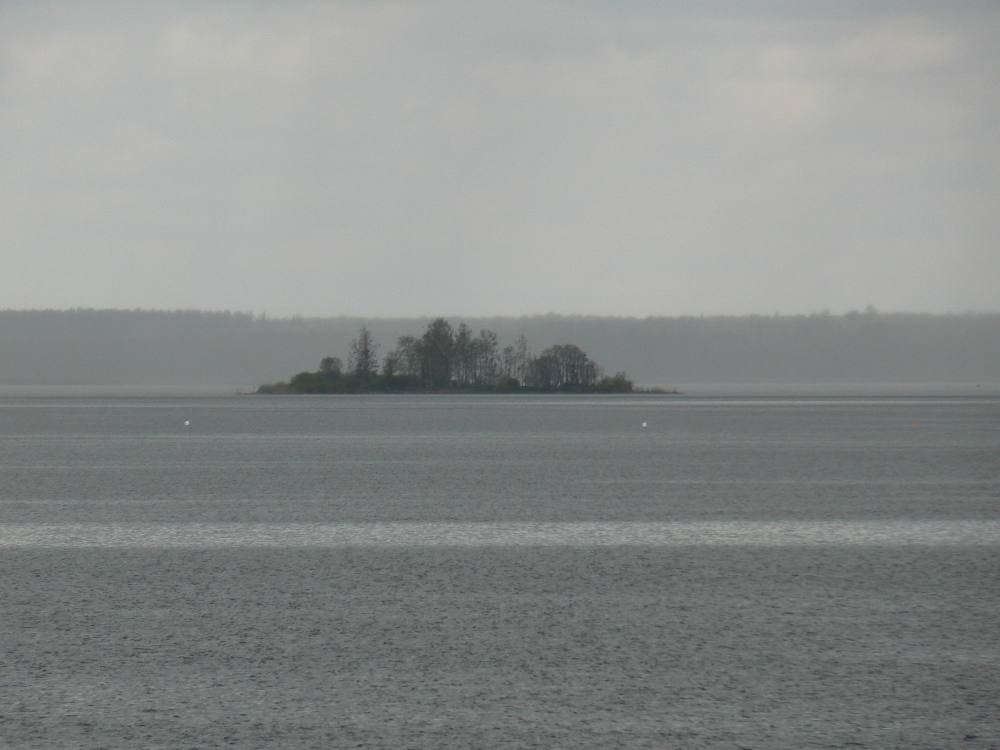
- Interactive map of Tondisaar

Geography
- Coordinates: 58.202°N 26.057°E

Tondisaar (lit. 'Haunted Island') is an island in the southern part of Estonia's second-largest lake, Võrtsjärv.

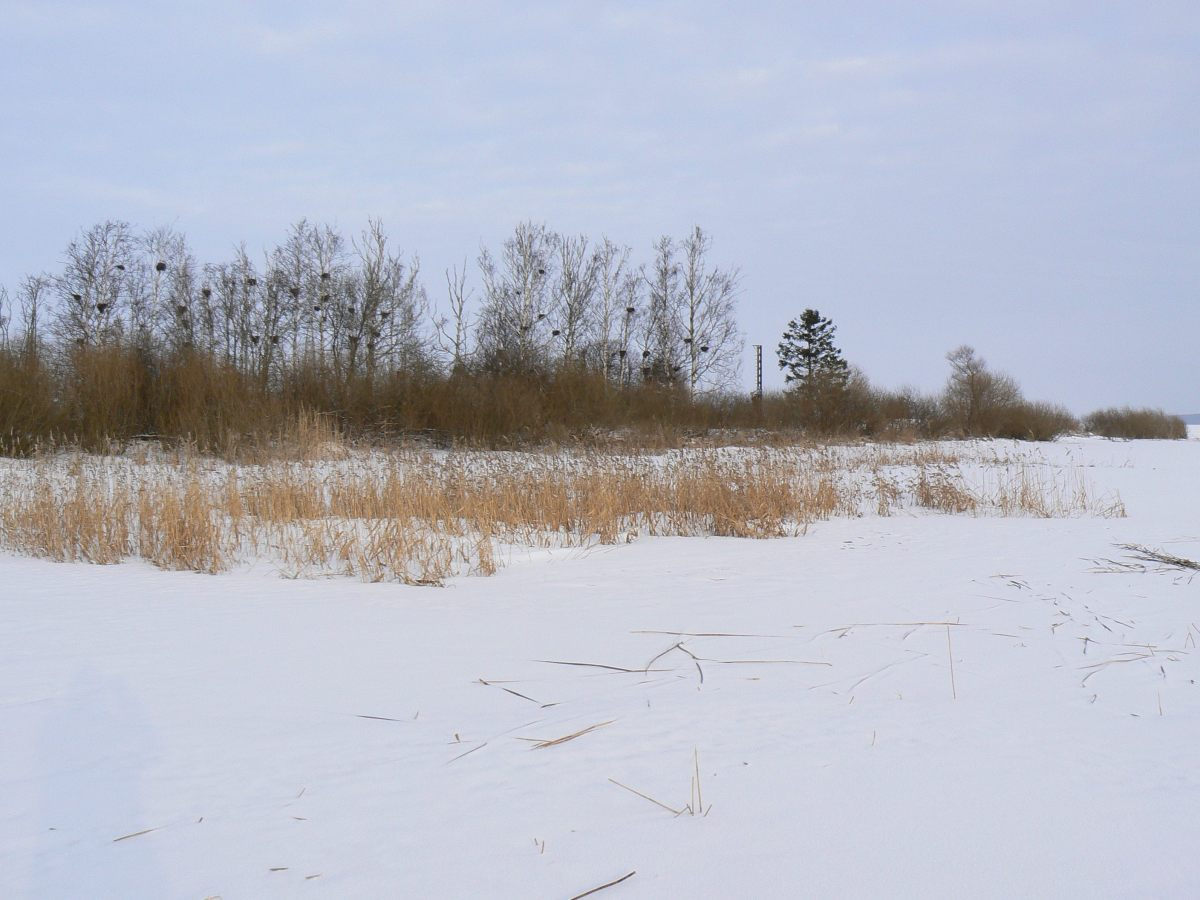
Nests of Great cormorants in the trees on Tondisaar

Tondisaar is the only inland nesting place for Great cormorants in Estonia.

== See also ==
- List of islands of Estonia
