= Palupõhja =

Village in Estonia

- Village
- Location in Estonia
- Coordinates: 58°25′19″N 26°14′00″E
- Country: Estonia
- County: Tartu County
- Municipality: Elva Parish

Population (01.01.2010)
  - Total: 4

Palupõhja is a village in Elva Parish, Tartu County, Estonia, located on the Alam-Pedja Nature Reserve. It has a population of 4 (as of 1 January 2010).

Palupõhja Nature School is located in the village. The school was opened in 2006.

Wrestler Rudolf Tihane (1892–1977) and composer, conductor, music teacher and critic Eduard Oja (1905–1950) were born in Palupõhja.
