= Andreas Ascharin =

Russian chess player (1843–1896)

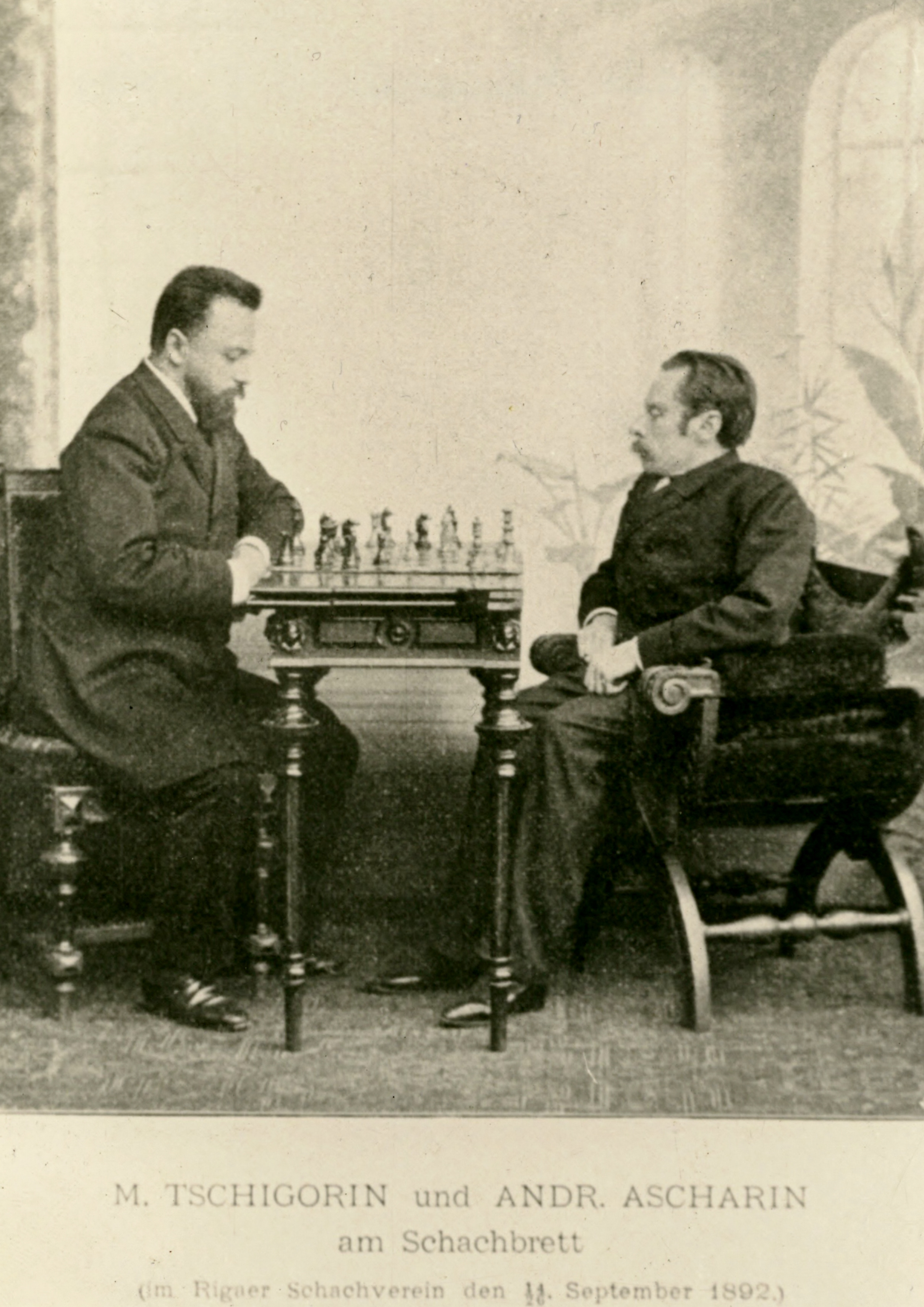
Mikhail Chigorin (left) playing against Andreas Ascharin in Riga 1892.

Andreas Ascharin (Russian: Андрей Александрович Ашарин, romanized: Andrey Aleksandrovich Asharin; 24 June [O.S. 12 June] 1843 in Pärnu – 24 December [O.S. 12 December] 1896 in Riga) was a Russian chess master of Baltic German descent.

== Life ==
Ascharin's father was Russian and his mother was from a Baltic German family. He read law in Dorpat (now Tartu). Between 1875 and 1879, he worked in Saint Petersburg as a journalist for the St. Petersburger Zeitung and the St. Petersburger Herold. He also played in local chess tournaments. In 1876, he won ahead of Mikhail Chigorin and Emanuel Schiffers. In 1877 he lost a match to Friedrich Amelung (+3 –4 =2). In 1878–1879, he took sixth place (Chigorin and Simon Alapin won).

From 1879, he lived in Riga where he worked as a teacher of German language at a gymnasium, and a translator of Russian literature into German. Among others, he published Schach-Humoresken (Riga 1894). He was a president of the Riga Chess Club.
