= Matti Kuusi =

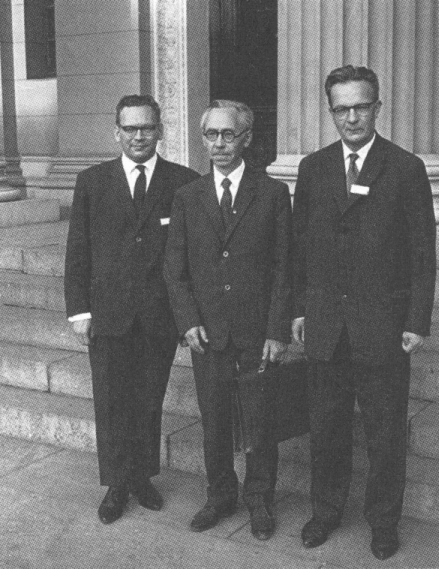
Folklorists Ülo Tedre, August Annist and Matti Kuusi in Helsinki, 1965.

Matti Akseli Kuusi (25 March 1914 – 16 January 1998) was a Finnish folklorist, paremiographer and paremiologist. He wrote several books and a number of articles on Finnish folklore. He was the first to have introduced the type system of proverbs similar to the Aarne–Thompson classification system of folklore, the Matti Kuusi international type system of proverbs. With encouragement from Archer Taylor he founded the journal Proverbium: Bulletin d'Information sur les Recherches Parémiologiques, published from 1965 to 1975 by the Society for Finnish Literature, which was later restarted as Proverbium: International Yearbook of Proverb Scholarship. He was born and died in Helsinki, a member of the noble family Granfelt, but his father had fennicized his original Swedish surname to express his political sympathies.

During his study period in the 1930s, Matti Kuusi was involved with nationalist political organizations. In the 1950s, he was appointed as the Professor of Folklore in the University of Helsinki, and later as the member of the Academy of Finland, becoming a nationally celebrated intellectual.

He led the effort to produce a collection of "900 Balto-Finnic Proverb Types with Russian, Baltic, German and Scandinavian Parallels", described as one of the "major multilingual proverb dictionaries". Although his personal research specialities were Finnish epic poetry and proverbs, he developed folklore studies in Finland by encouraging research of urban legends and pop-lore. He also took an interest in African folklore.

The international proverb typology developed by Kuusi, along with its database of proverbs, is available online.

Kuusi's interest in the study of proverbs has been continued by his daughter, Outi Lauhakangas.

Among the scientific achievements of Matti Kuusi, one of the most influential has been the rough chronology he established for the various layers of Finnish epics, based on stylistic analysis, motifs and comparisons with Old Scandinavian and Russian epics.

He is buried in the Hietaniemi Cemetery in Helsinki.

== Related literature ==
- Kaivola-Bregenhøj, Annikki. "Matti Akseli Kuusi (1914-1998)." Fabula 40.1/2 (1999): 114ff.
