= Eesnurga =

Village in Estonia

- village
- Location in Estonia
- Coordinates: 58°31′09″N 25°56′40″E
- Country: Estonia
- County: Viljandi County
- Municipality: Viljandi Parish

Population (01.01.2000)
  - Total: 87

Eesnurga is a village in Viljandi Parish, Viljandi County, in central Estonia. It is located just southwest of Kolga-Jaani. According to Estonia Census 2000, the village had a population of 87.
