= Ülo Tedre =

Estonian folklorist (1928–2015)

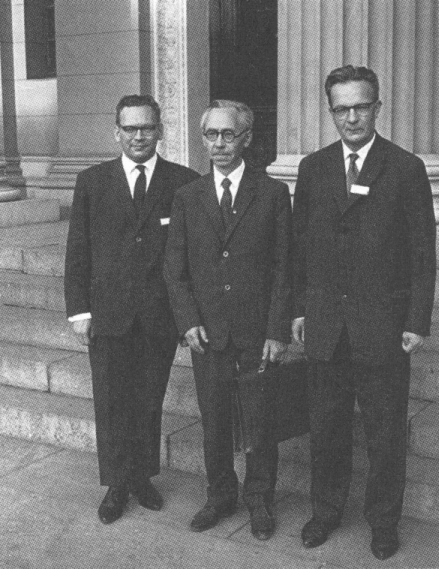
Ülo Tedre (on the left), August Annist and Matti Kuusi in 1965

Ülo Tedre (12 February 1928 Tallinn – 9 March 2015) was an Estonian folklorist.

In 1951, he graduated from Tartu State University in Estonian philology a diploma thesis in folklore. After graduating he worked at Estonian SSR Academy of Sciences' Language and Literature Institute.

== Awards ==
- Order of the White Star, III class.

== Works ==
- "Eesti rahvalaulud" (1969–1972)
- Estonian Customs and Traditions (27 October 1995)
