= Tamme, Tartu County =

Village in Estonia

- Village
- Location within Estonia
- Coordinates: 58.273055555556°N 26.140555555556°E
- Country: Estonia
- County: Tartu County
- Parish: Elva Parish
- Time zone: UTC+2 (EET)
  - Summer (DST): UTC+3 (EEST)

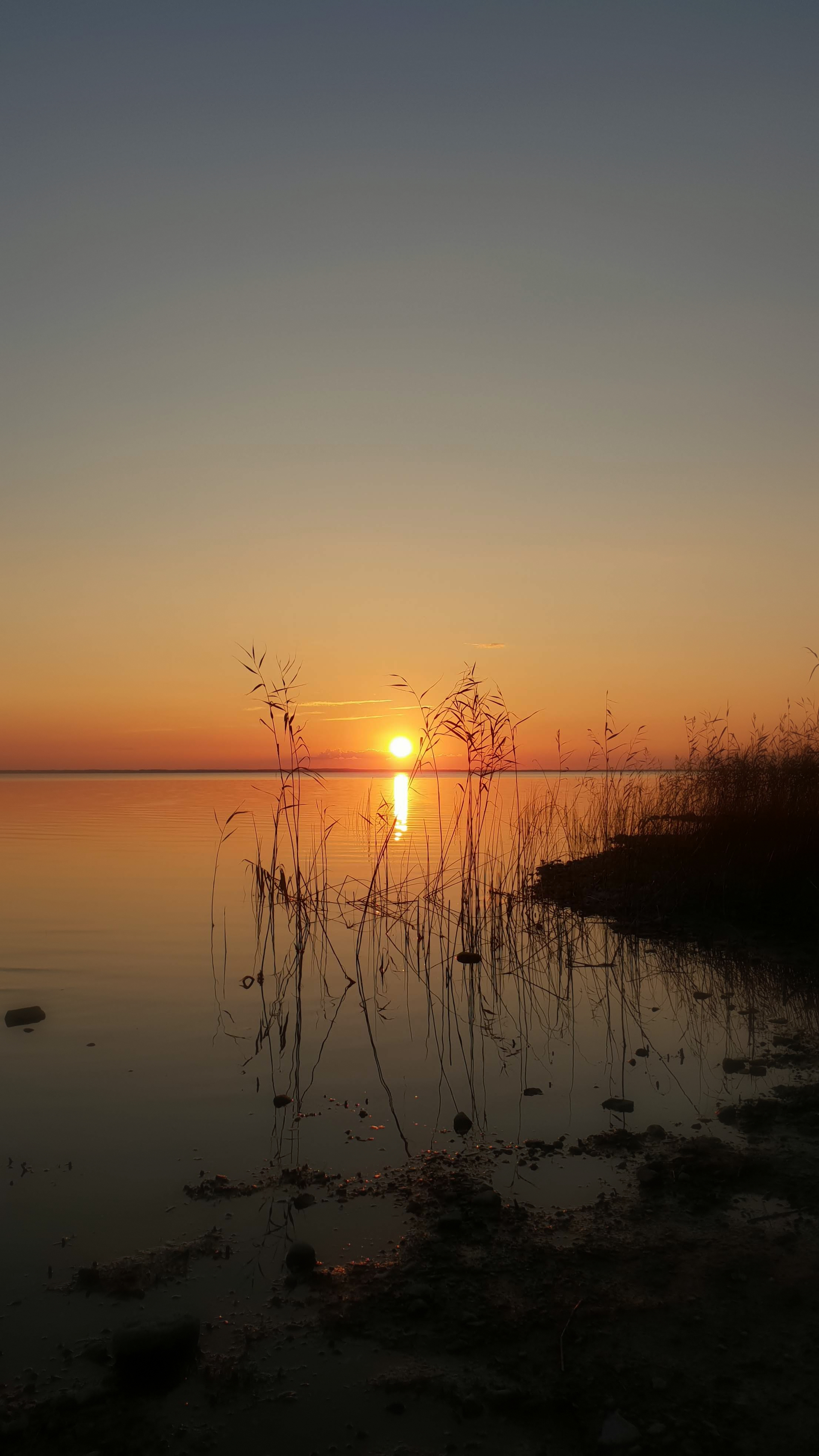
A sunset in Tamme over Lake Võrtsjärv

Tamme is a village in Elva Parish, Tartu County in Estonia. It is located on the eastern shore of Lake Võrtsjärv.
