= Vaibla =

Village in Estonia

- Village
- Location within Estonia
- Coordinates: 58.406111111111°N 26.071388888889°E
- Country: Estonia
- County: Viljandi County
- Parish: Viljandi Parish
- Time zone: UTC+2 (EET)
  - Summer (DST): UTC+3 (EEST)

Drone video of Vaibla village and lake Võrtsjärv in Viljandi parish, Estonia (August 2022)

Vaibla is a village in Viljandi Parish, Viljandi County in Estonia. It is located north of Lake Võrtsjärv.
