= Varangu, Väike-Maarja Parish =

Village in Estonia

Coordinates: 59°02′13″N 26°05′26″E

Varangu
- Village
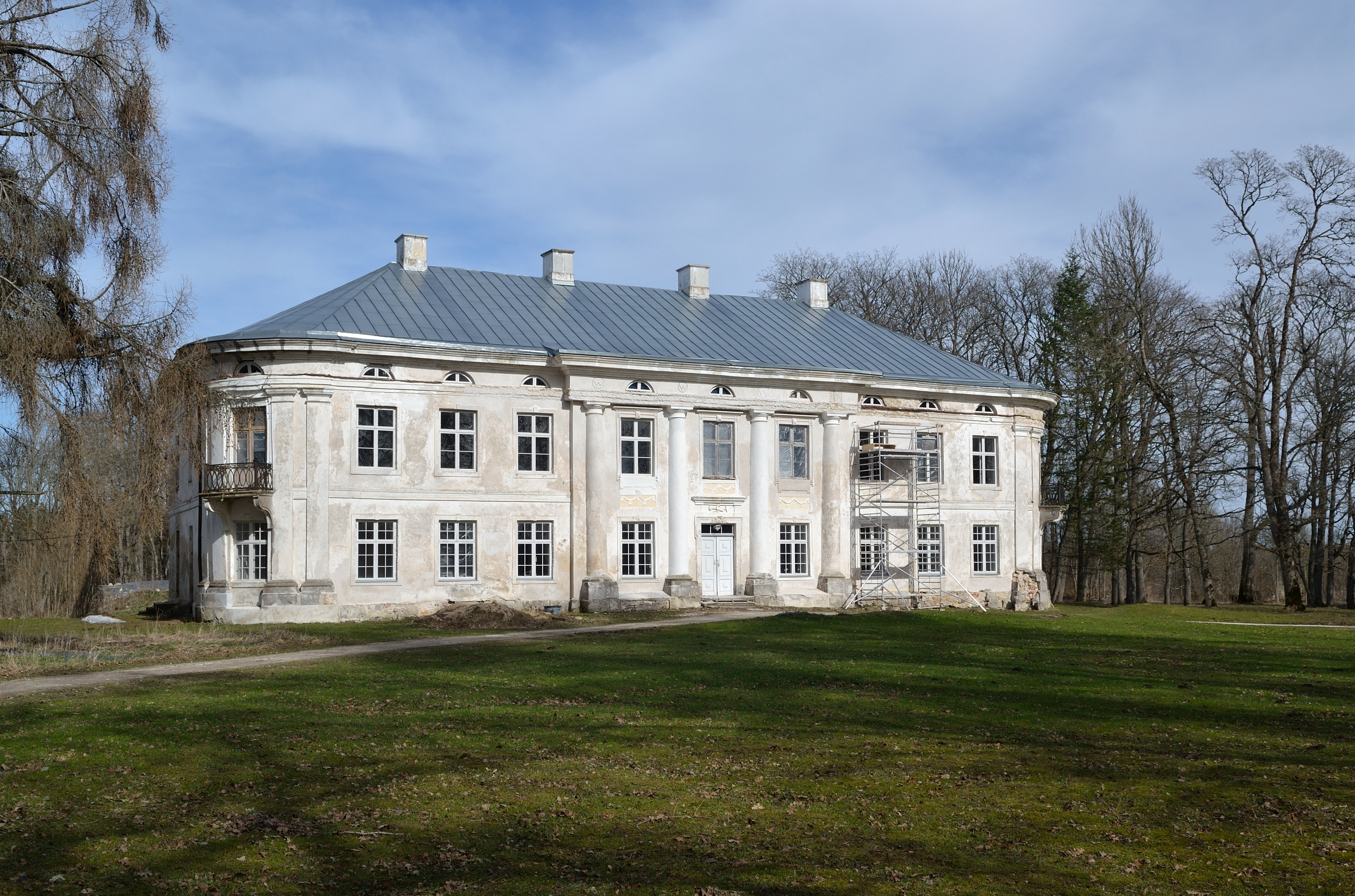
- Varangu manor
- Interactive map of Varangu
- Country: Estonia
- County: Lääne-Viru County
- Parish: Väike-Maarja Parish
- Time zone: UTC+2 (EET)
  - Summer (DST): UTC+3 (EEST)

Varangu (German: Warrang) is a village in Väike-Maarja Parish, Lääne-Viru County, in northeastern Estonia.

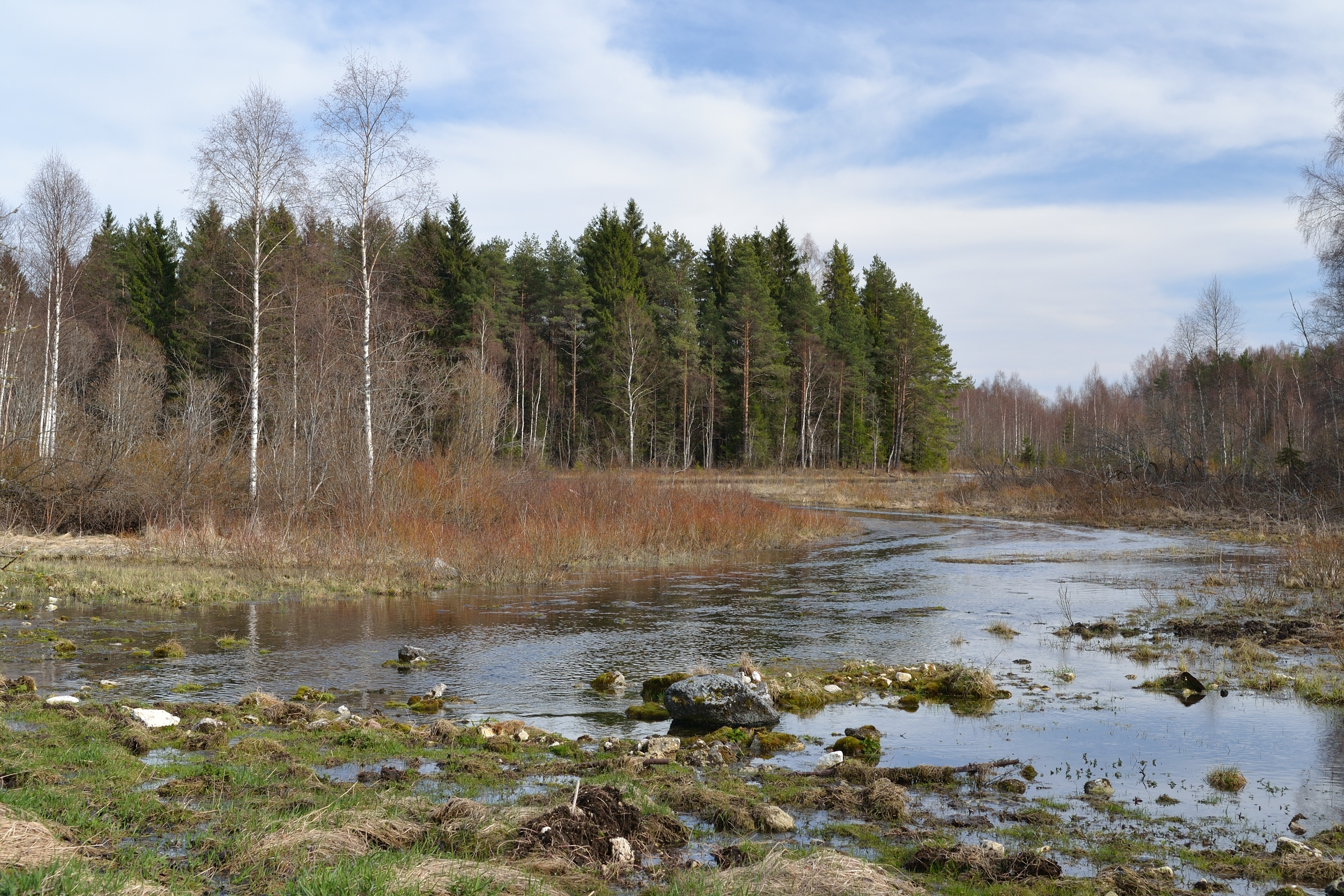
Varangu Blue Springs at the source of the Preedi River
