= Võisiku =

Village in Estonia

- Village
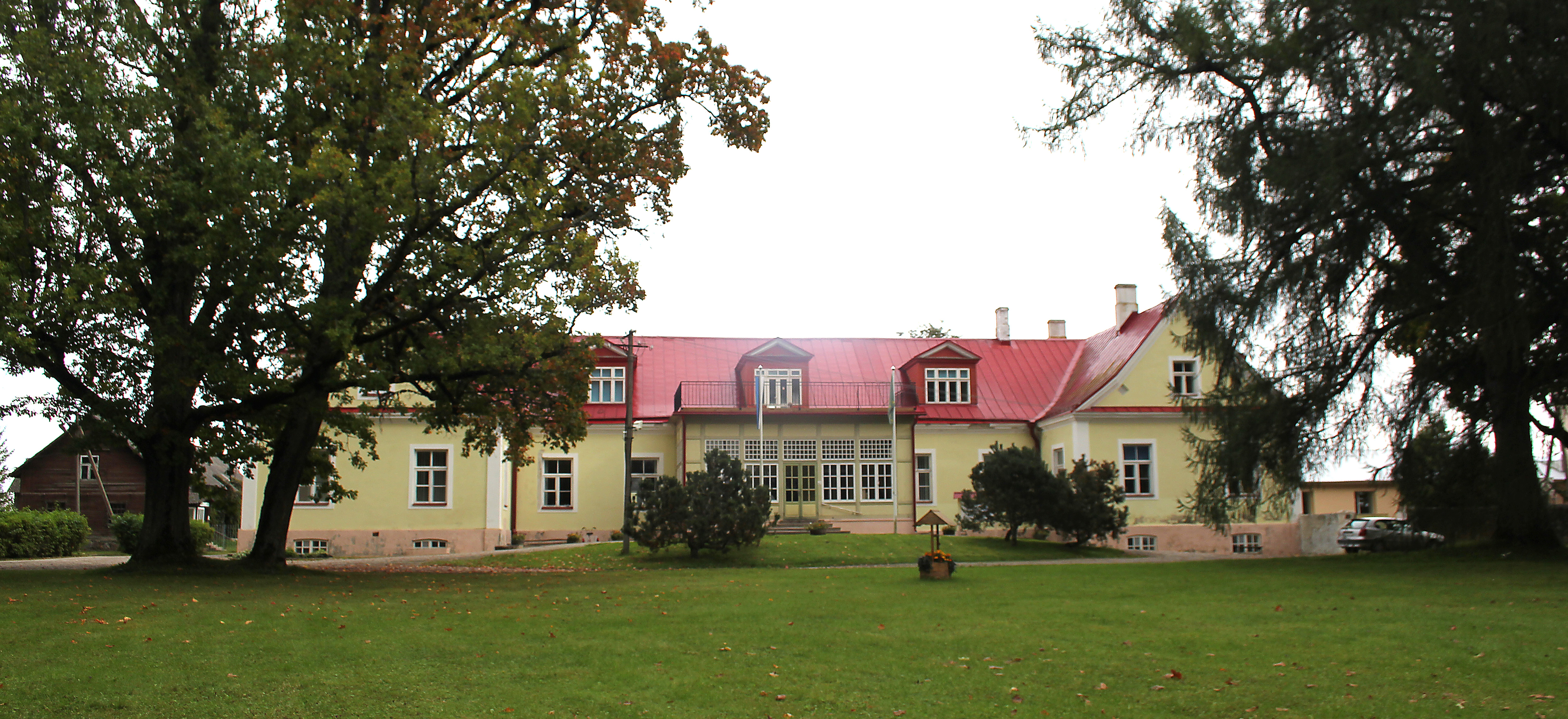
- Võisiku Manor

- Location in Estonia
- Coordinates: 58°37′32″N 25°55′08″E
- Country: Estonia
- County: Jõgeva County
- Municipality: Põltsamaa Parish
- First mentioned: 1558

Population (2010)
  - Total: 376

Võisiku is a village in Põltsamaa Parish, Jõgeva County, in central Estonia. It is located about 5 km southwest from the town of Põltsamaa. Võisiku has a population of 376 (as of 2010).

== Võisiku Manor ==
Võisiku estate (German: Woiseck) was first mentioned in 1558. The current building was constructed in the second half of the 18th century. A veranda was added at a later date.

Timotheus Eberhard von Bock (1787-1836), about whom Jaan Kross has written one of his most well-known novels, The Czar's Madman, lived at Võisiku manor.

Chess player and endgame composer Friedrich Amelung was born at Võisiku Manor in 1842.
