= Tänassilma (river) =

River in Estonia

Tänassilma River
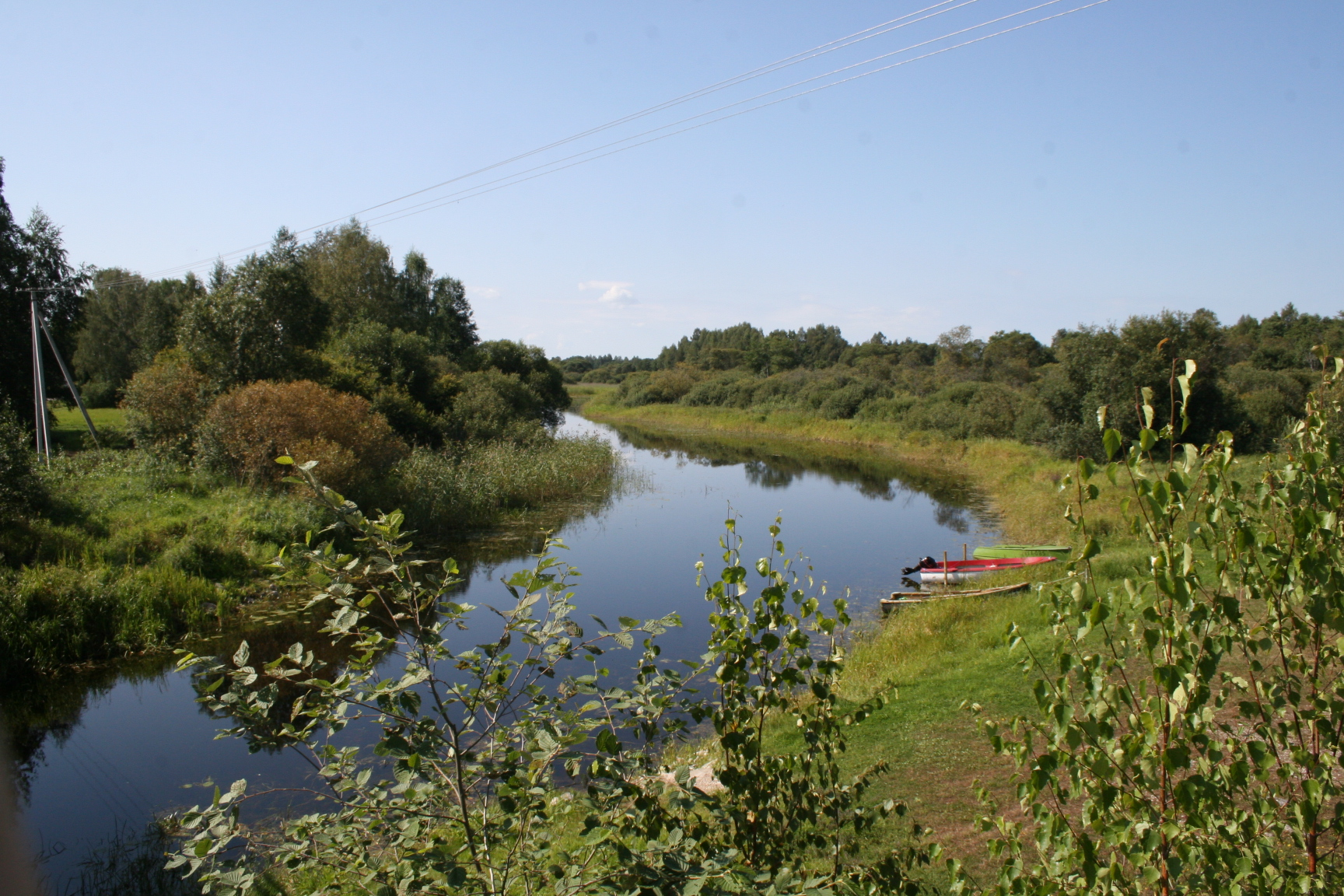

Location
- Country: Estonia

Physical characteristics
- Mouth: Lake Võrts
  - coordinates: 58°23′47″N 25°58′58″E
- Length: 39.9 km (24.8 mi)
- Basin size: 448.7 km^{2} (173.2 sq mi)

The Tänassilma River is a river in Viljandi County, Estonia. The river is 39.9 km long, and its basin size is 448.7 km^{2}. It discharges into Lake Võrts.
