= Varangu, Haljala Parish =

Village in Estonia

Coordinates: 59°29′14″N 26°19′29″E

Varangu
- Village
- Interactive map of Varangu
- Country: Estonia
- County: Lääne-Viru County
- Parish: Haljala Parish
- Time zone: UTC+2 (EET)
  - Summer (DST): UTC+3 (EEST)

Varangu is a village in Haljala Parish, Lääne-Viru County, in northeastern Estonia.
