= Vissuvere, Viljandi County =

Village in Estonia

Vissuvere
- village
- Location in Estonia
- Coordinates: 58°32′46″N 25°54′22″E
- Country: Estonia
- County: Viljandi County
- Municipality: Viljandi Parish

Population (01.01.2000)
  - Total: 73

Vissuvere is a village in Viljandi Parish, Viljandi County, in central Estonia. It Is located about 2 km (1 mi) northwest of Kolga-Jaani. According to Estonia Census 2000, the village had a population of 73.
