= Väike Emajõgi =

River in Estonia

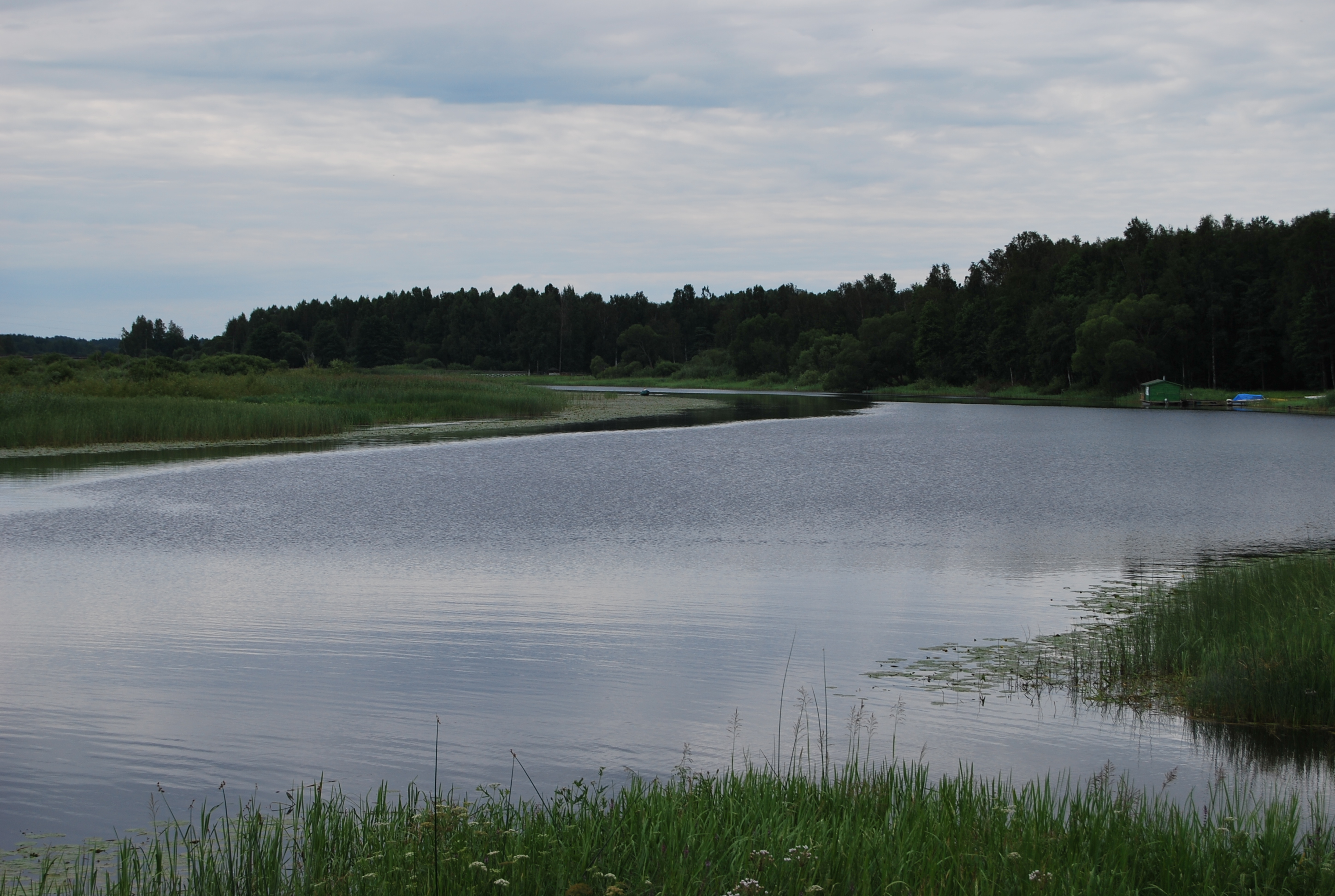
- Väike Emajõgi in Pikasilla

Location
- Countries: Estonia; Latvia

Physical characteristics
- Source
  - location: Lake Pühajärv
- Mouth
  - location: Lake Võrtsjärv
  - coordinates: 58°06′N 26°04′E
- Length: 82 km (51 mi)
- Basin size: 1,380 km^{2} (530 sq mi)

Basin features
- Progression: Lake Võrtsjärv→ Emajõgi→ Lake Peipus→ Narva→ Gulf of Finland

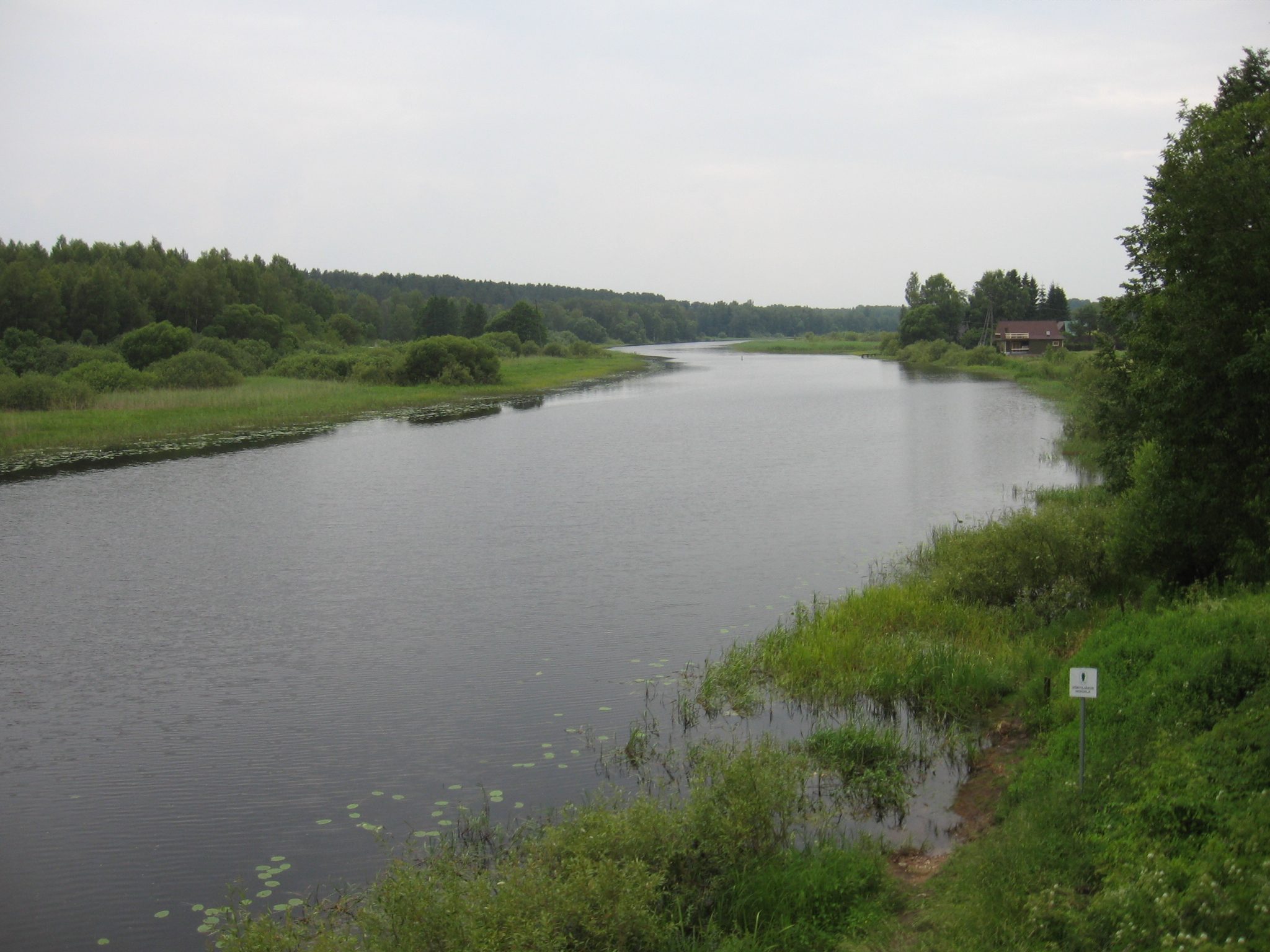
Väike Emajõgi

The Väike Emajõgi is a river in southern Estonia that drains into Lake Võrtsjärv. The length of the river is 93.4 km (58.0 mi).
