= Oiu, Estonia =

Village in Estonia

- Village
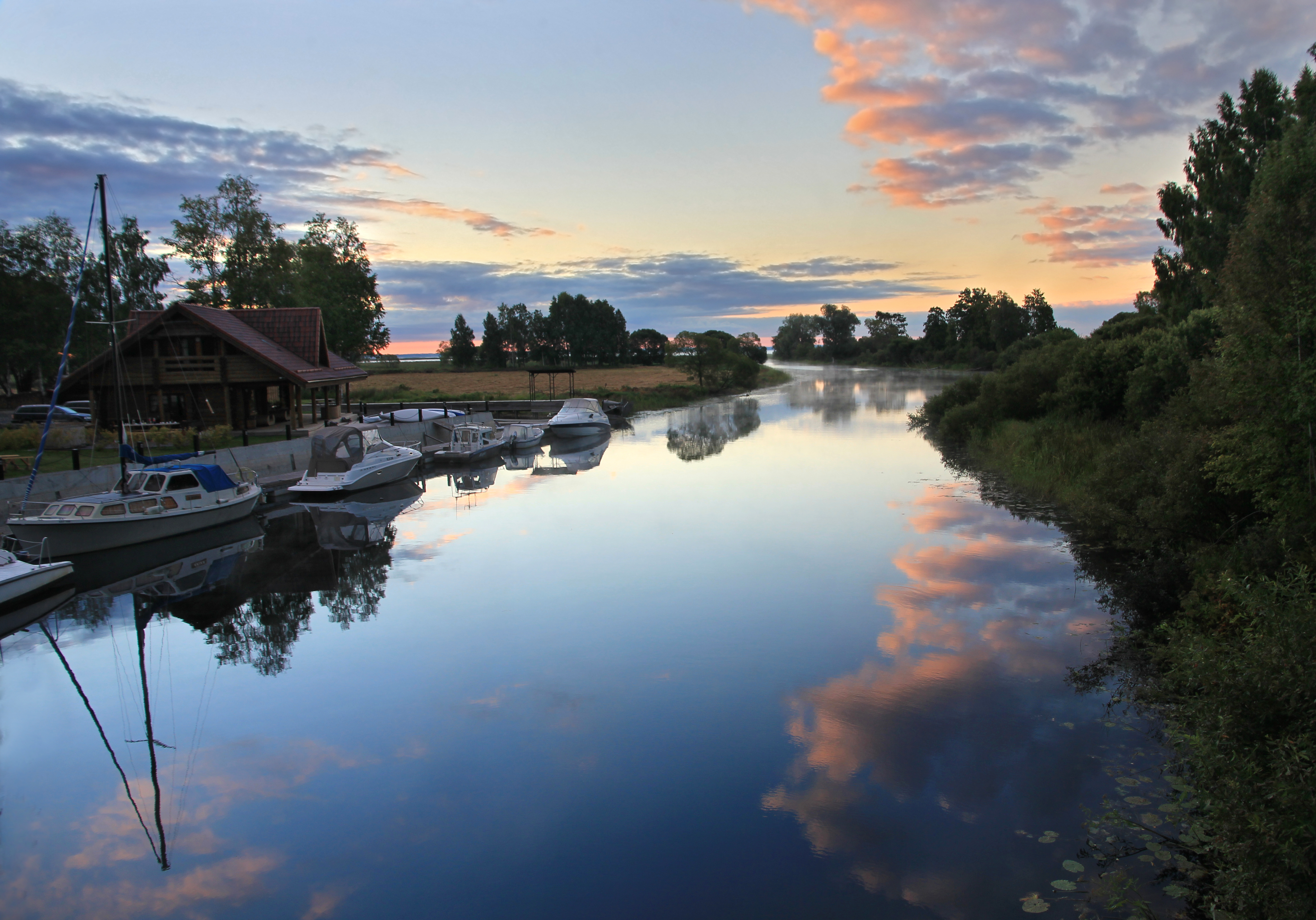
- Oiu harbour at the mouth of the Tänassilma River

- Location within Estonia
- Coordinates: 58.4128°N 25.9769°E
- Country: Estonia
- County: Viljandi County
- Parish: Viljandi Parish
- Time zone: UTC+2 (EET)
  - Summer (DST): UTC+3 (EEST)

Oiu is a village in Viljandi Parish, Viljandi County in Estonia.
