= Leie, Estonia =

Village in Estonia

- Village
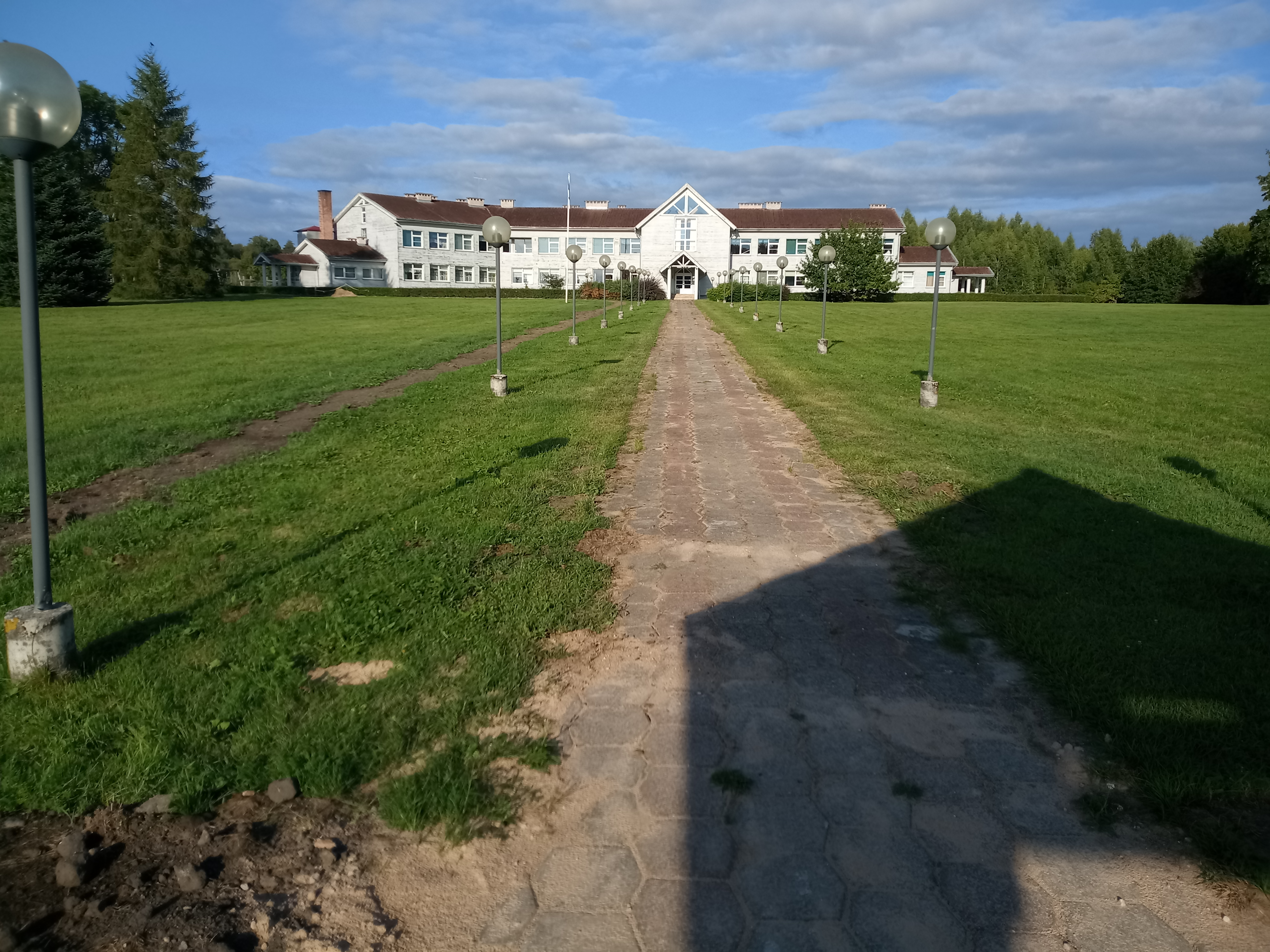
- Leie school

- Location within Estonia
- Coordinates: 58.4275°N 26.026111111111°E
- Country: Estonia
- County: Viljandi County
- Parish: Viljandi Parish
- Time zone: UTC+2 (EET)
  - Summer (DST): UTC+3 (EEST)

Leie is a village in Viljandi Parish, Viljandi County in Estonia.
