= Põltsamaa (river) =

River in Estonia

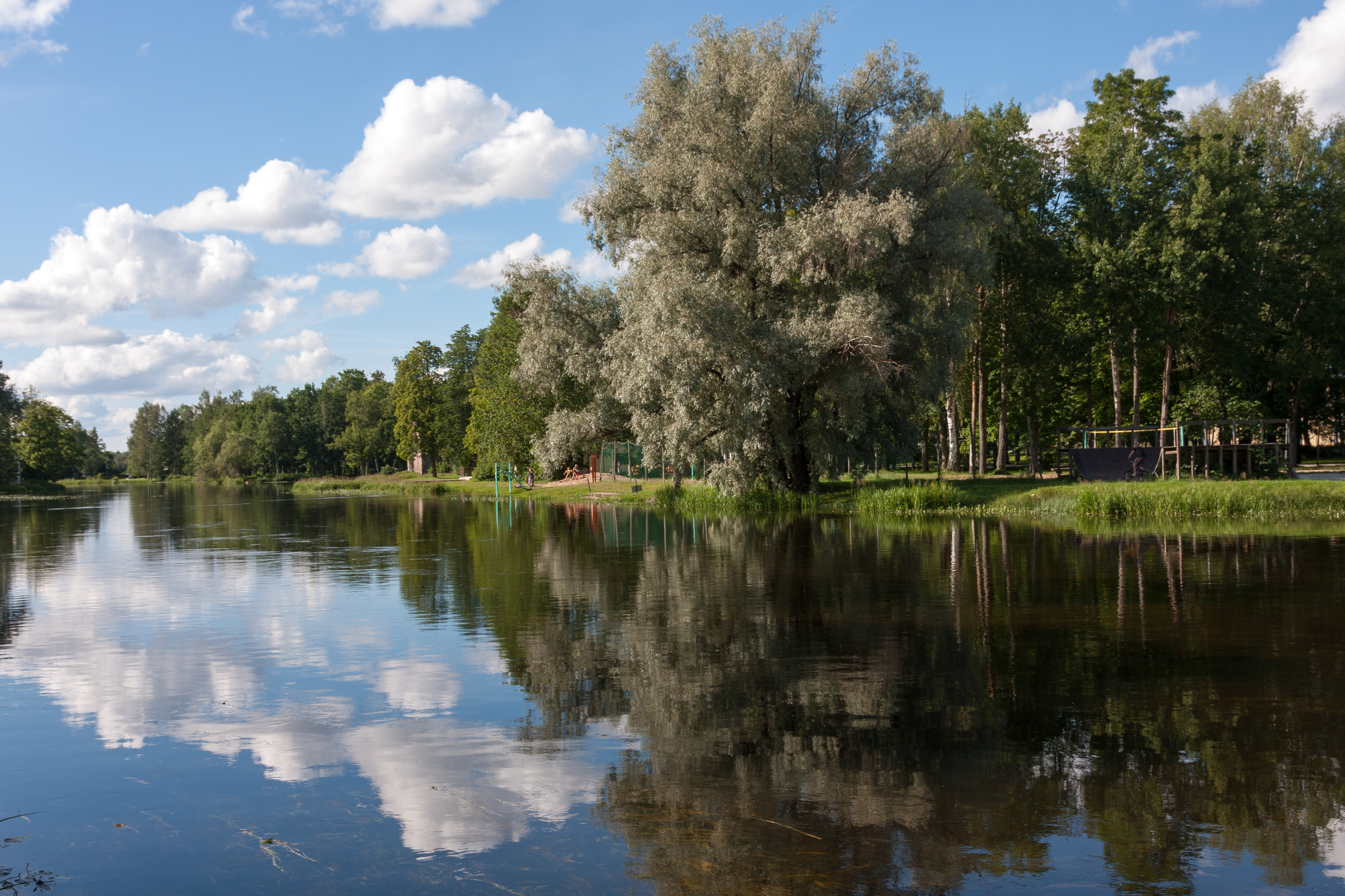

Location
- Country: Estonia
- Region: Jõgeva County, Järva County, and Lääne-Viru County

Physical characteristics
- Mouth: Pedja River
  - coordinates: 58°26′41″N 26°09′46″E
- Length: 135 km (84 mi)

Basin features
- Tributaries
  - right: Preedi

The Põltsamaa is the third-longest river in Estonia. It flows through Põltsamaa Parish and the centre of the town of Põltsamaa on the northeast side of Põltsamaa Castle. It is a tributary of the Pedja.
