= Kolga-Jaani =

Borough in Estonia

- Small borough
- Location in Estonia
- Coordinates: 58°32′01″N 25°56′39″E
- Country: Estonia
- County: Viljandi County
- Municipality: Kolga-Jaani Parish

Population
  - Total: 417

Kolga-Jaani (German: Klein-Sankt Johannis) is a small borough (Estonian: alevik) in Viljandi Parish, Viljandi County, central Estonia. Prior to the administrative reform of Estonian local governments in 2017, it was the administrative centre of Kolga-Jaani Parish. Kolga-Jaani has a population of 417.
