= Võrtsjärv =

Lake in Estonia

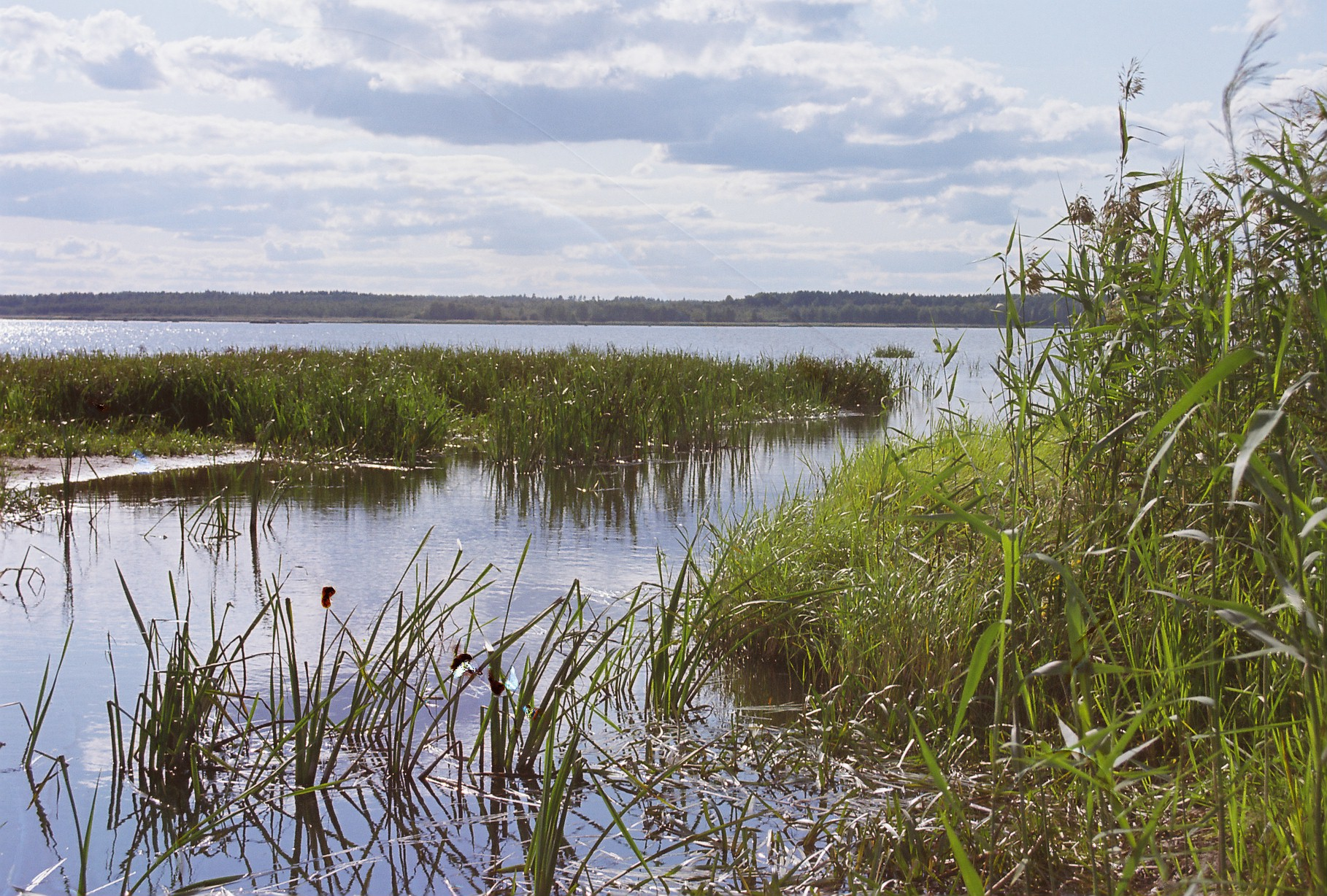
- Võrtsjärv by a river mouth near Rõngu

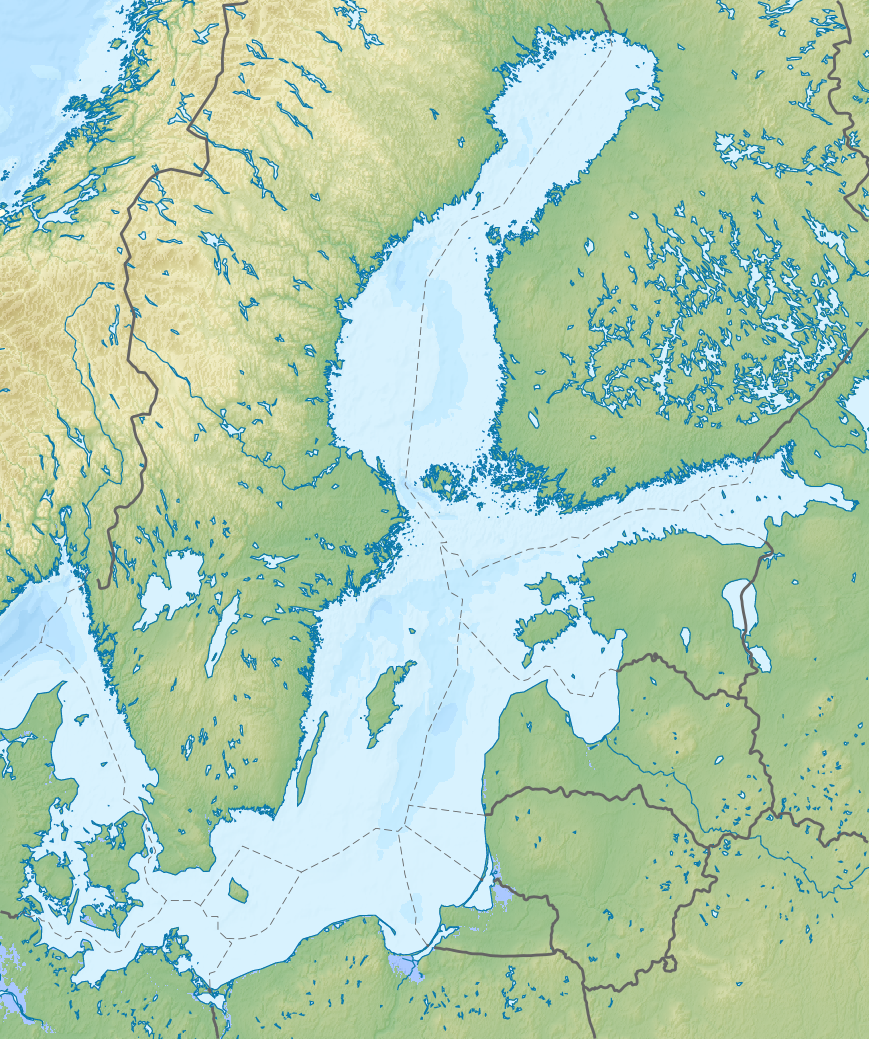
- Location within Europe Location within the Baltic Sea region Location within Estonia
- Location: Estonia
- Coordinates: 58°17′N 26°02′E
- Primary inflows: Väike Emajõgi; Tänassilma; Õhne; Tarvastu
- Primary outflows: Emajõgi
- Catchment area: 3,100 km^{2} (1,200 sq mi)
- Basin countries: Estonia, Latvia
- Surface area: 270 km^{2} (100 sq mi)
- Average depth: 2.7 m (8 ft 10 in)
- Max. depth: 6 m (20 ft)
- Water volume: 0.8 km^{3} (650,000 acre⋅ft)
- Shore length^{1}: 96 km (60 mi)
- Surface elevation: 33.7 m (111 ft)
- ^{1} Shore length is not a well-defined measure.

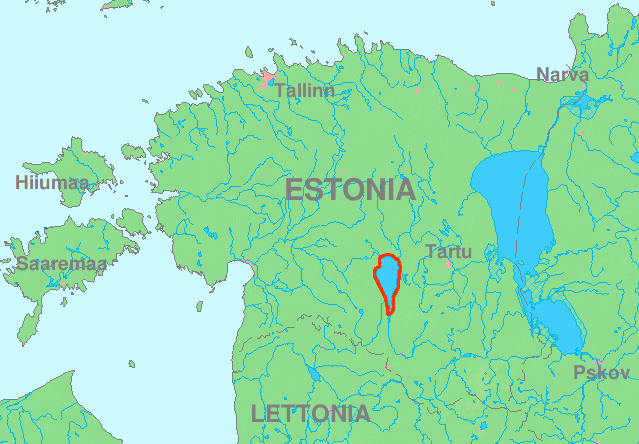
Location in Estonia

Võrtsjärv (Estonian: Võrtsjärv [ˈʋɤrts.jærʋ]; English: Lake Võrts) is a lake in southern Estonia with an area of 270 km^{2} (100 sq mi).

It is the second-largest lake in Estonia (after Lake Peipus), and it is the largest lake entirely within Estonia. The shallow lake is 33.7 m (111 ft) above sea level. The Emajõgi River flows from Võrtsjärv to Lake Peipus.

== History ==
The lake basin existed before the last Ice Age, but it was then transformed by moving ice sheets that partly eroded the lake wall and partly filled the depression with deposits. In its present form, the lake has existed since the Middle Holocene.

It was first mentioned c. 1229 in the Livonian Chronicle of Henry, where it is called Worcegerwe.

== Geography ==
The relatively low shores of the lake are swampy in the south and sandy in the north. On the eastern shore, there is a coastal abrasion near the village of Tamme; these cliffs have yielded a number of fossils of Devonian fish, which have been compared to similar fossils found in Scotland.

There are a few small islands in the southern part of the lake. Of these only Tondisaar and Pähksaar are permanent islands, while Ainsaar becomes a peninsula during low water and Heinassaar is submerged at high water. This is because of the lake's fluctuating water level, which changes with a mean annual amplitude of 1.4 m; this is about half of its 2.8 m average depth. From around November to April, the lake is covered with ice.

Northeast of the lake is the Alam-Pedja Nature Reserve, the largest nature reserve in Estonia.

== Ecology ==
Around 35 species of fish are found in the lake, a few of which are commercially important. After a decline of valuable species during the 1950s and 1960s, some conservation measures were enforced, which led to an improvement in the situation. Today, around 400 tons of fish are caught annually.

Võrtsjärv is the main catchment area for eel in Estonia. However, fishing is entirely dependent on restocking with farmed glass eels because eels are migratory and no longer return in sufficient quantities to Europe. Due to declining numbers of natural eel, in 2017 the European Union's Agriculture and Fisheries Council decided on a three-month ban on eel fishing in the Baltic Sea during eel migratory season. Eel caught in the Baltic Sea had only accounted for a mere 700 kg the year before, as opposed to an average of 10.2 to 13.3 tons per year in Võrtsjärv.

The lake and the nearby wetlands are also an important breeding ground for birds, as well as a staging area for migratory birds. Altogether, 213 bird species have been recorded around the lake.

In recent decades, eutrophication of the lake has increased, with detrimental effects on biological diversity. This is thought to be mainly caused by a combination of poorly treated wastewater influx as well as phosphorus and nitrate runoff from agriculture. In addition, climatic fluctuations seem to have a stronger influence on the lake due to its shallow depth.

== Tourism ==
The region is little known as a tourist destination internationally and, especially in the second half of the 20th century, the deteriorating water quality posed a continuous problem for both fishing and tourism development. However, more recently, in 2010, Võrtsjärv was voted a European Destination of Excellence.

There is a visitor centre and museum on the east shore of the lake.

In 2016, the lake was the site of the WISSA World Championships in iceboating on the frozen lake.

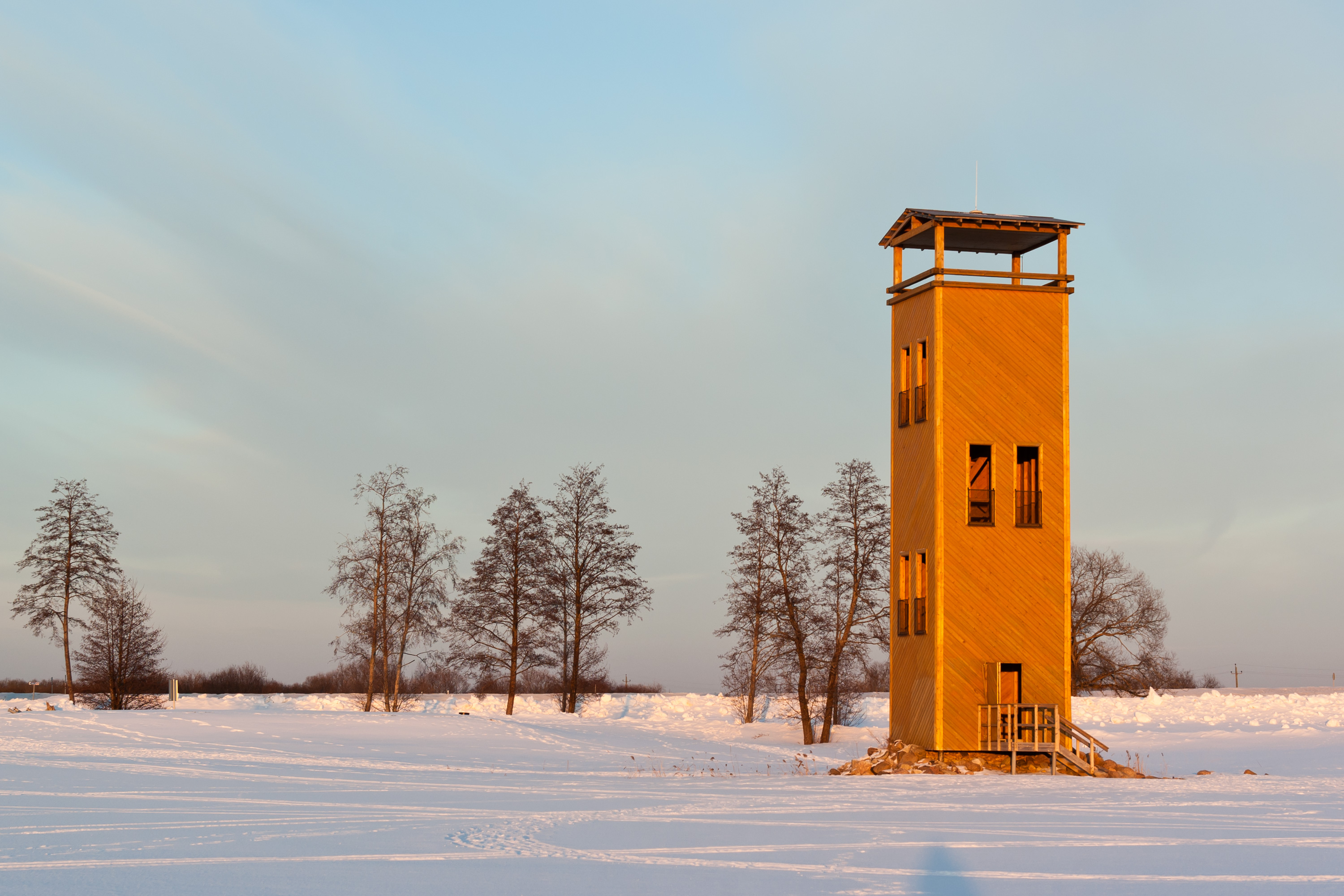
Jõesuu watchtower on the northern shore of Võrtsjärv

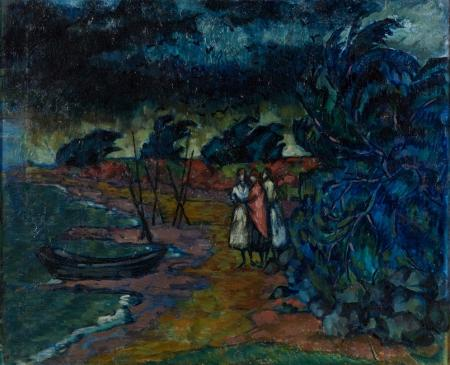
The Shore of Võrtsjärv by Konrad Mägi. Oil on canvas, 1917

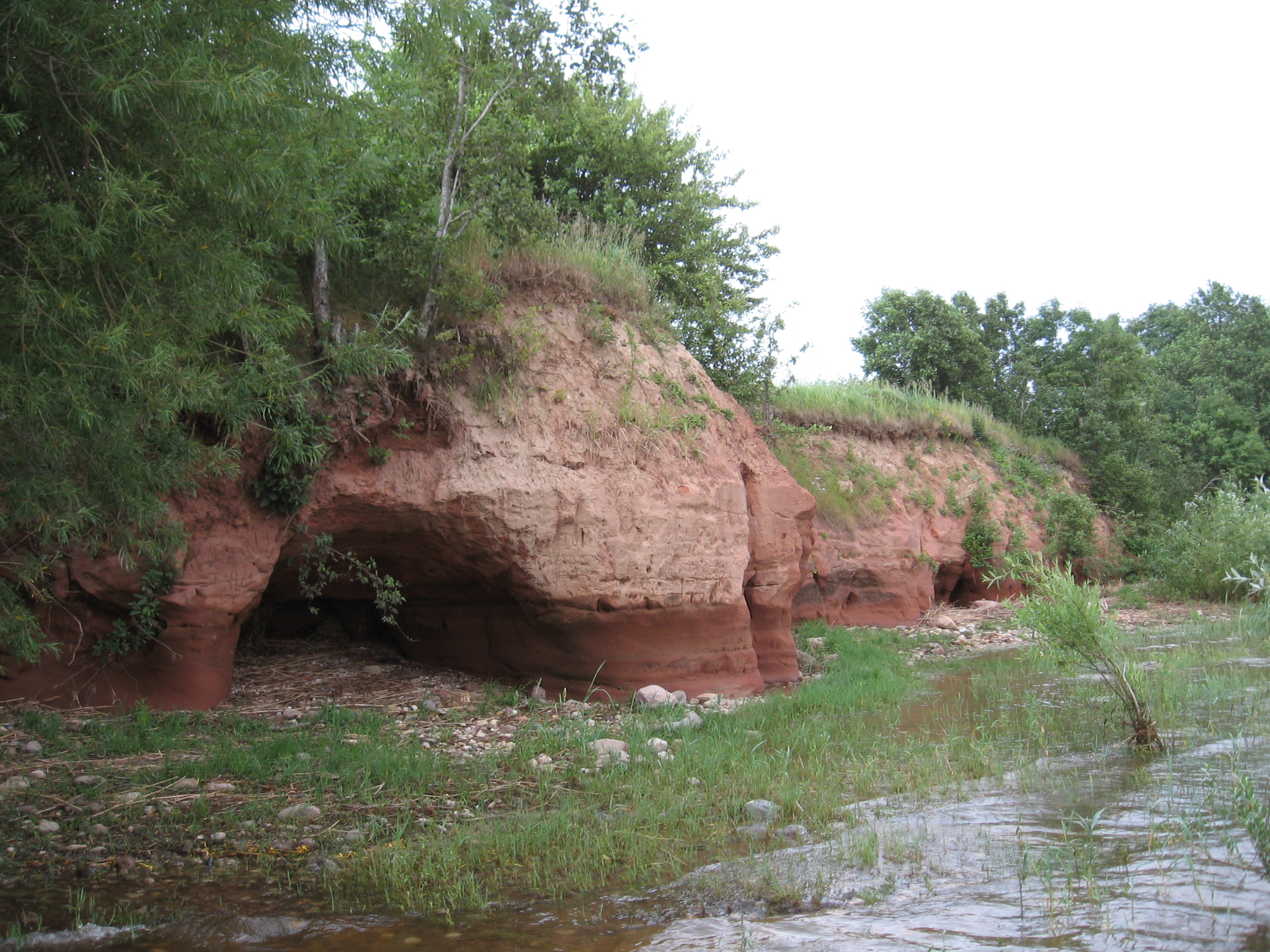
Tamme outcrop

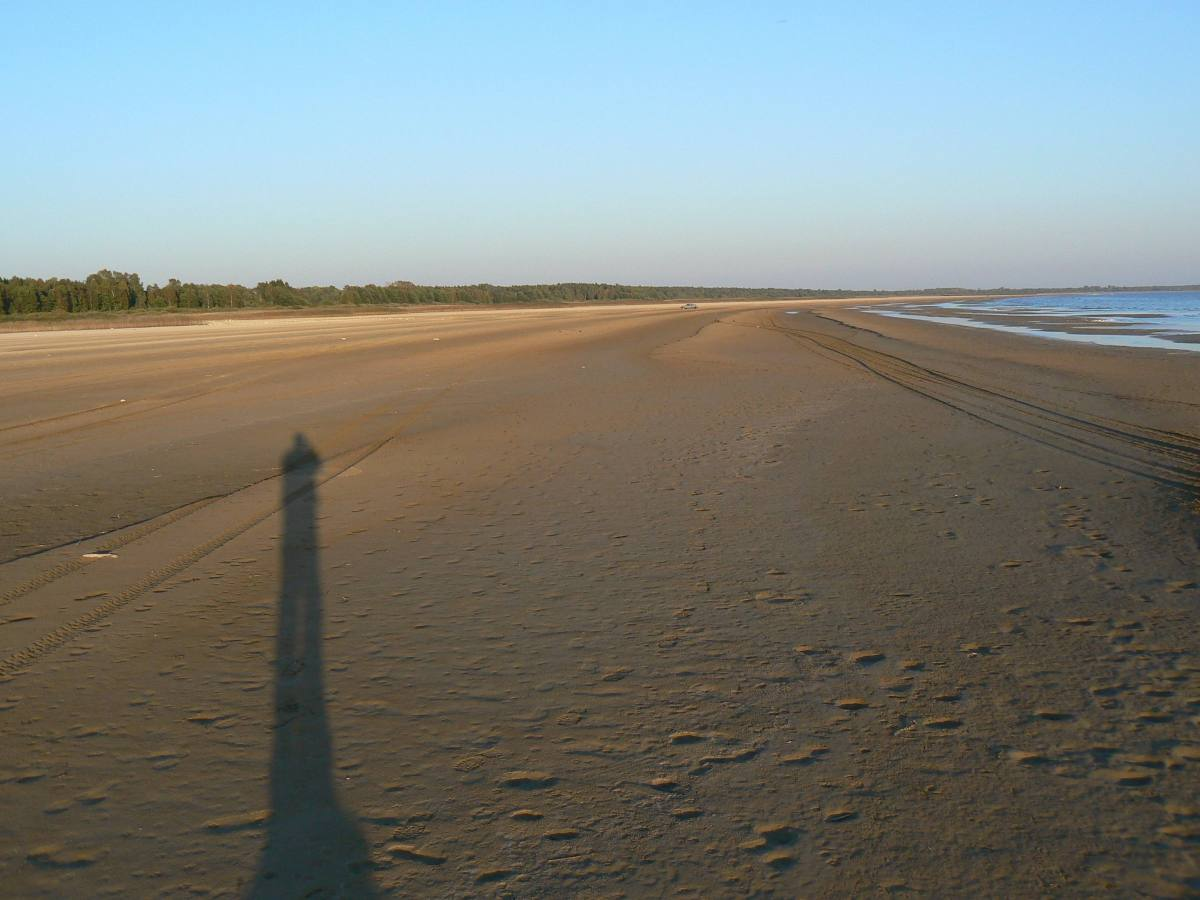
Võrtsjärv shore during an extremely low tide, near Valma (2006)

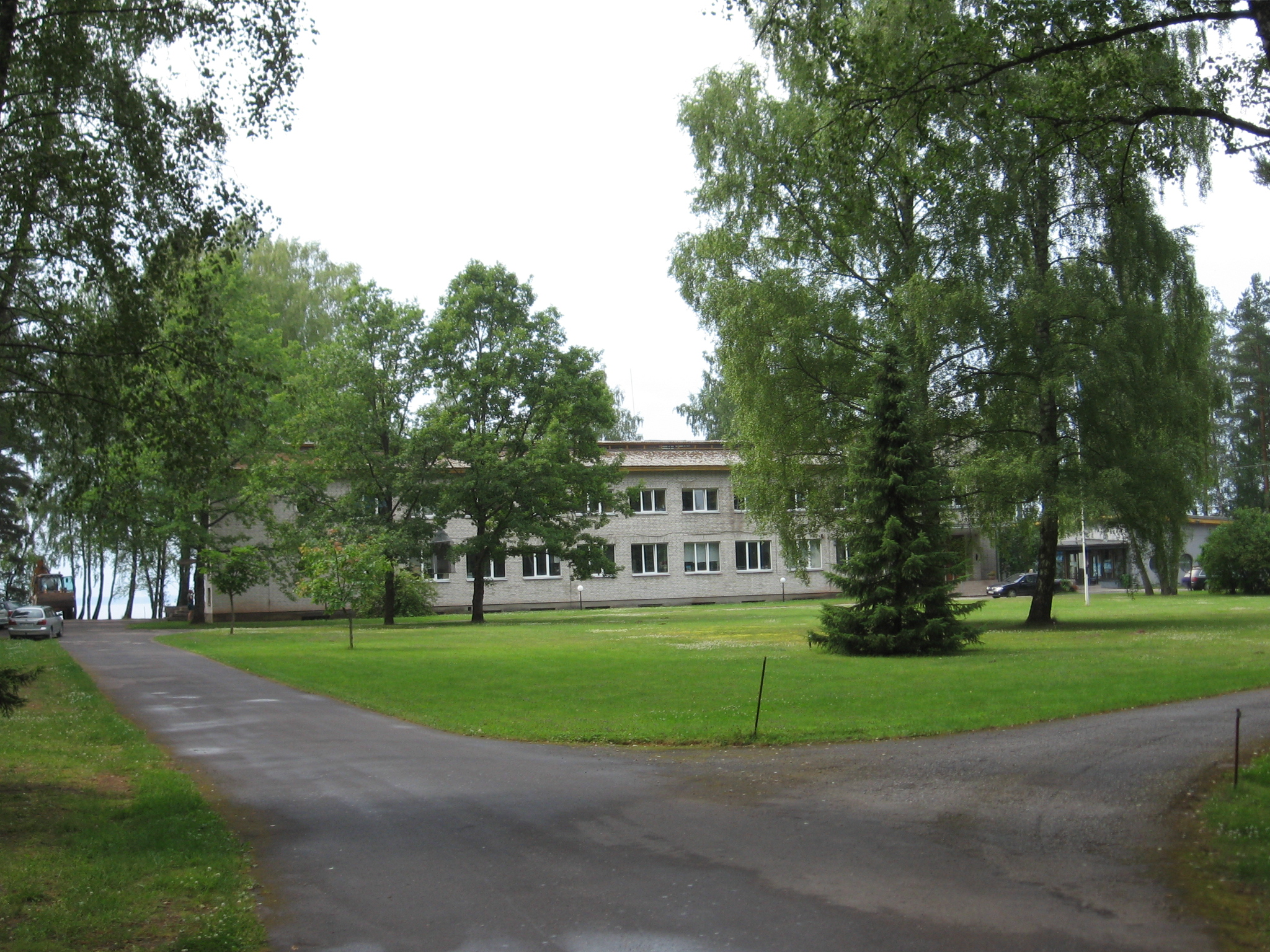
Limnology Centre of the Estonian University of Life Sciences by Võrtsjärv, in Vehendi
