= Ott Tänak: The Movie =

Documentary film of the rally driver Ott Tänak

- Promo poster
- Directed by: Tarvo Mölder
- Written by: Kaidi Klein
- Produced by: Eero Nõgene; Sterotek Film
- Starring: Ott Tänak; Malcolm Wilson; Markko Märtin; Sébastien Ogier; Jari-Matti Latvala; Esapekka Lappi; Thierry Neuville; Martin Järveoja
- Narrated by: Becs Williams
- Cinematography: Margus Malm
- Edited by: Hermes Brambat
- Music by: Garry Ferrier
- Release date: April 11, 2019
- Running time: 138 minutes
- Country: Estonia
- Languages: Estonian; English; Finnish; Japanese

Ott Tänak: The Movie is a 2019 documentary film directed by Tarvo Mölder about the life and rallying career of World Rally Championship driver Ott Tänak.

== Synopsis ==
The film follows the progression of Estonian rally driver Ott Tänak, who is known for his determination and tenacity in the World Rally Championship, from his second-place finish at the Rally Monte Carlo to his retirement in Rally Australia.

In parallel with a behind-the-scenes look at Ott's performance at the 2018 season during his stint with Toyota Gazoo Racing, the film also features vignettes from Ott's early life and rally career in the island of Saaremaa along with glimpses of his personal life with his wife and children at home and during his rallies.

== Cast ==
In addition to Ott himself, various people from Ott's life and career were interviewed and featured. Among them are his mentor and retired WRC driver Markko Märtin, Ott’s former boss, Malcolm Wilson, head of M-Sport, the head of Ott's former team Toyota Gazoo Racing and four-time world champion Tommi Mäkinen, six-time world champion and Ott's former Ford team-mate Sébastien Ogier, his co-driver Martin Järveoja, his team-mates Jari-Matti Latvala and Esapekka Lappi, nine-time world champion Sébastien Loeb, rally commentators and journalists Becs Williams, Colin Clark, Molly Pettit and David Evans, as well as Ott’s family including his wife, children and his father, along with his grandmother who follows all of her grandson’s rallies online.

== Development ==
The film crew followed Ott Tänak over the course of the entire 2018 season of the World Rally Championship events and observed his efforts to become the world champion. The movie was filmed in 13 countries: Estonia, Monaco, France, Italy, Sweden, Portugal, Mexico, Germany, Finland, The United Kingdom, Spain, Australia and Japan.

In an interview, Tänak stated that “The purpose of the film was for everything to be recorded the way life is, there is no acting and I wasn’t more polite because of the camera.” “Just like 2018, as we know, my whole career hasn’t been the most boring one.”

While he was unable to win the championship at the time when the film was being produced, the film did include new closing shots when Tänak won the championship in 2019.

== Release ==
=== Marketing ===
The trailer was released by Sterotek Film via YouTube on December 22, 2018, and was released theatrically in Estonia on April 11, 2019. The film was also released worldwide through Netikino.ee, an Estonian video-on-demand service, on October 1, 2019.

== Reception ==
Ott Tänak: The Movie broke domestic box office records in its first week of release in Estonia, beating the record set by Joosep Matjus' The Wind Sculpted Land for the most watched Estonian documentary of all time.

== Additional credits ==
The Swedish Umeå-based band Dark Roots were featured in the film with their two singles "The Devil's Aisle" and "Where No Man Should Go". Both songs were written by Christian Larsson, who is the main songwriter in the band.

== See also ==
- Legends of the Winding Road
