= Arbi =

Arbi may refer to:

- Arbi (name)
- Lake Arbi, lake in Elva, Estonia
- Arbi, an Indian term for taro (Colocasia esculenta)

== See also ==
- Al-Arbi (disambiguation)
- Arpi (disambiguation)
