= Elva Cemetery =

Cemetery in Elva, Estonia

Coordinates: 58.210639°N 26.422753°E

- Elva kalmistu
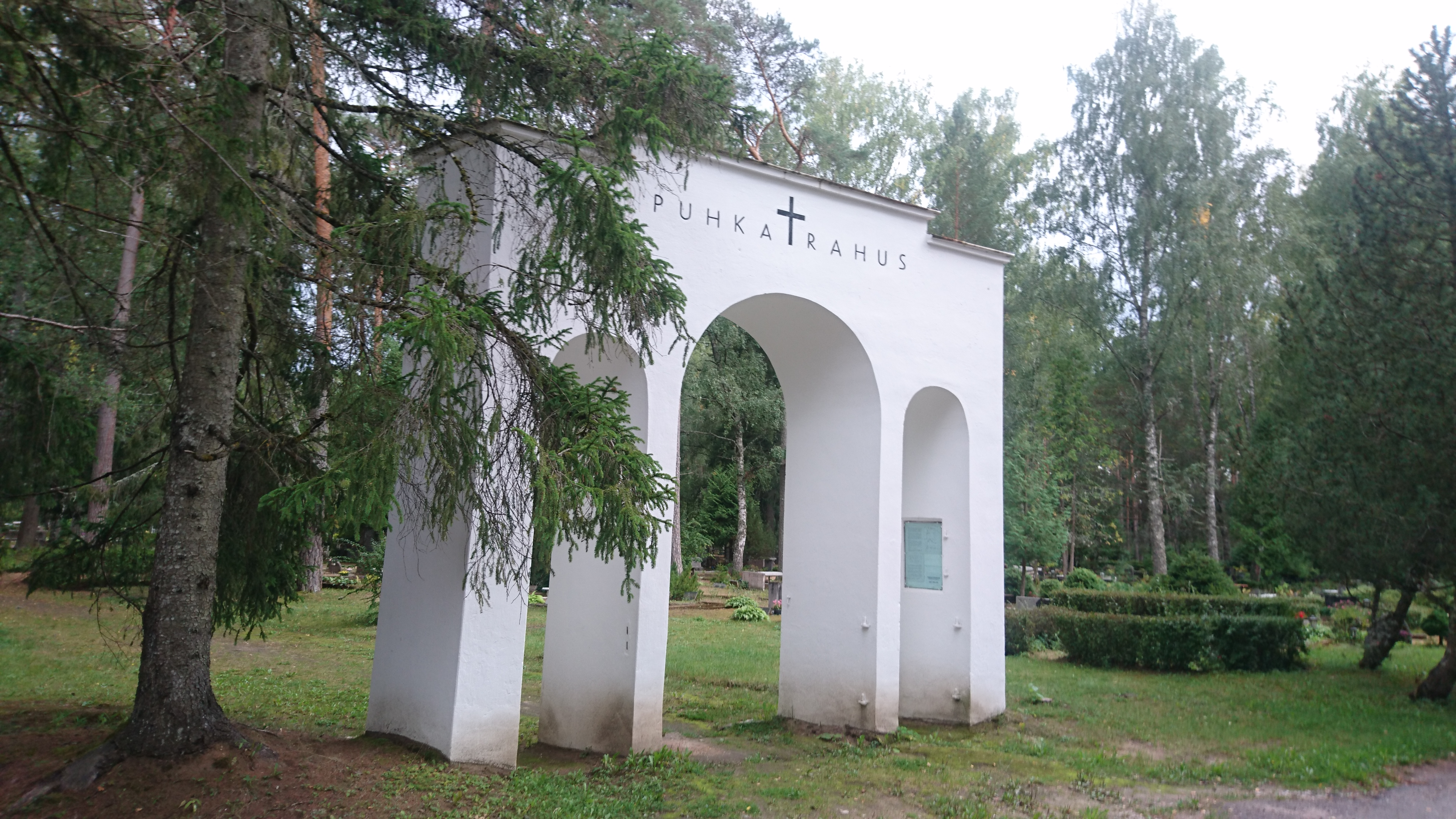
- Interactive map of Elva Cemetery

Details
- Established: 1924
- Location: Elva
- Country: Estonia

Elva Cemetery (Estonian: Elva kalmistu) is a cemetery in a forest park on the edge of the city of Elva, Estonia. The address of the cemetery is Vaikne tänav 39.

== History ==
Elva Cemetery was established in 1924. The main gate was designed by Hanno Kompus in 1934. The new part of the cemetery was designed by the landscape architect Nora Tammoja.

== Notable people ==
Notable people interred at Elva Cemetery include the following:

- Leopold Hansen (1879–1964), actor and theater director
- Richard Janno (1900–1942), writer and journalist
- Ain Kaalep (1926–2020), writer
- Jaan Kärner (1891–1958), writer
- Ivan Kondakov (1857–1931), chemist
- Hugo Kulbok (1890–1942), soldier (cenotaph)
- Jim Ollinovski (1974–1993), writer
- Daniel Palgi (1899–1988), literary critic
- Jaan Rommot (1941–2010), television director
- Johannes Silvet (1895–1979), linguist
- Karl-Johannes Soonpää (1895–1944), politician and civil servant
- Ants Sööt (1935–2013), choir director
- Endel Varep (1915–1988), geographer
- Ago Viljari (1910–1989), theologian
- Charles Villmann (1923–1992), physicist and astronomer
- Vadim Želnin (1909–1996), meteorologist
