= Karl-Johannes Soonpää =

Estonian politician

Karl-Johannes Soonpää (born Karl-Johannes Soonberg; 2 March 1895 in Pangodi Parish (now Kambja Parish), Kreis Dorpat – 15 June 1944 near Elva, Estonia) was an Estonian politician and civil servant.

Soonpää participated in the Estonian War of Independence as a lieutenant and received the Cross of Liberty for his service.

Soonpää studied at the Faculty of Religion and the Faculty of Agriculture of the University of Tartu, graduating in 1926. Afterwards, he became involved in politics, joining the Settlers' Party, then after the 1932 party merger, the Union of Settlers and Smallholders. He was a member of the III, IV and V Riigikogu. He also served as the Minister of Labour for a year, from 1927 until 1928, the Minister of Agriculture from 1928 until 1929 and the State Auditor from 1929 until 1940.Political offices:

He was one of the few high-ranking statesmen who escaped the June deportation by Soviet authorities following the Soviet occupation of Estonia. Early on the morning of 14 June 1941, he learned from acquaintances that a large number of suspicious railway wagons had been brought to the Elva railway station. Soonpää fled on his bicycle, and his wife Antonie left the family farm with the children. Soonpää gathered with other men in the forest and joined the Forest Brothers. On 22 June 1941, the men learned of Operation Barbarossa, the German invasion of the Soviet Union, and hid in the forest until the arrival of the Germans in July.

At the beginning of the German occupation, Soonpää collaborated with the Germans. He was the head of several administrative positions related to agriculture. He was also the head of the Elva municipal department of the Estonian Agricultural Union, and the head of its Omakaitse (self-defense) group.

Following the reoccupation of Estonia by the Soviets in 1944, Soonpää was killed in June, aged 49, when he tried to capture Soviet saboteurs with two men at night in the forest near Elva. He was buried in Elva Cemetery.
