= Richard Janno =

Estonian writer, journalist, and teacher (1900–1942)

- Born: January 10, 1900; Tallinn, Estonia
- Died: December 29, 1942 (aged 42); Elva, Estonia
- Resting place: Elva Cemetery
- Education: University of Tartu
- Occupations: Writer, journalist, and teacher

Richard Janno (January 10, 1900 – December 29, 1942) was an Estonian writer, journalist, and teacher. He wrote under the pseudonyms Juhan Pahlbärk, Tristan, and Koterman.

== Early life and education ==
Richard Janno was born in Tallinn, the son of the shoemaker Hans Janno (1865–1907) and Caroline Weikmann (a.k.a. Karoline Vegman, 1866–?).

After graduating from Tallinn Secondary School in 1919, he enrolled at the University of Helsinki's Faculty of Philosophy (1919–1921) and then continued at the corresponding faculty at the University of Tartu (1920–1927), and he then attended the School of Law at the University of Tartu (1927–1928).

== Career ==
In Helsinki, Janno worked as a tutor for August Hanko's family. From 1922 to 1927, he worked as a teacher in Tartu. From 1928 to 1936, he was part of the Postimees editorial board as a columnist. In addition, he published cultural and political cartoons for Postimees under the pseudonym Juhan Pahlbärk, and theater criticism under the initials R. J. He also authored some crime novels.

In 1936, Janno was diagnosed with tuberculosis and moved to Elva, where he worked as a freelance writer. He died in Elva in 1942.

== Bibliography ==
- 1929: Metsmees (The Savage; novel). Loodus. Second prize in the Loodus novel competition, 1929. Reprint: Eesti Raamat, 1989, in the series Eesti romaanivara (Estonian Novels).
- 1930: Neitsi Maaria: jutt ühest haprast alpilillest (The Virgin Mary: The Story of a Fragile Alpine Flower; story). Loodus, in the series Looduse universaal-biblioteek (Loodus Universal Library) no. 120/121.
- 1930–1931: Sinine ümbrik (The Blue Envelope; crime novel). Published in installments in Postimees, published as a book in 1931.
- 1931: Kuningas Toom (King Toom; juvenile fiction). Eesti Õpetajate Liit, in the series Noorusmaa jutukirjastik (Stories for Youth) no. 18.
- 1933: Selja tagant (Behind the Back; crime novel). Loodus, in the series Tänapäeva romaan (Today's Novels) no. 22. Reprint: Fatum, 1993, in the series Taskudetektiiv (Pocket Detective).
- 1933: Valeraha: kurb ja lõbus jutt (Counterfeit Money: A Sad and Funny Story). Postimees.
- 1935: Vutimehed (The Soccer Boys; children's story). Eesti Kirjastuse Kooperatiiv. Reprints: Orto, 1947, in the series Kooliväljaanne (School Publication) no. 6; Eesti Raamat, 1968 and 1974.
- 1937: Kaks ja üksainus (Two and Only One; novel). Eesti Kirjastuse Kooperatiiv.
- 1942: Kassisaba poisid (The Boys from Kassisaba). Not published until 1974 by Eesti Raamat together with the fourth edition of Kaks ja üksainus.
