= 2022 World Singles Ninepin Bowling Classic Championships – Women's combined =

Bowling championship

Women's combined at the 2022 World Singles Ninepin Bowling Classic Championships
- Location: Elva, Estonia
- Dates: 23-28 May 2022
- Competitors: 62 from 15 nations
- Winning score: 891

Medalists
gold medal	Luminita Viorica Dogaru	Romania
silver medal	Anna Müller	Germany
bronze medal	Jana-Sophie Bachert	Germany

The women's combined event at the 2022 World Singles Ninepin Bowling Classic Championships was held in Elva, Estonia from 23 May to 28 May 2022.

== Results ==
The result for the combined was the sum of best results from a starts in the single and sprint.

Rank	Name	Country	Single						Sprint					Total
Rank	Name	Country	Q	1/16	1/8	1/4	1/2	F	1/16	1/8	1/4	1/2	F	Total
1st place, gold medalist(s)	Luminita Viorica Dogaru	Romania	**658**	613	618				202	**233**	190			891
2nd place, silver medalist(s)	Anna Müller	Germany	**672**	651	608	626	645	648	**209**					881
3rd place, bronze medalist(s)	Jana-Sophie Bachert	Germany	**645**	604	632	593	636		**219**	199	205			864
4	Hana Wiedermannová	Czech Republic	**627**	586	602				198	195	**234**	214	192	861
5	Boglárka Hari	Hungary	**645**	613	619	595	634	615	**216**					861
6	Eva Sajko	Slovenia	**654**	610	603				**204**	190	194	200		858
7	Matea Juričić	Croatia	**649**	611	614				**203**					855
8	Nikola Tatoušková	Czech Republic	610	610	**638**	587			**213**	179				851
9	Yvonne Schneider	Germany	**627**	620	607	567	555		**218**	198	191			845
10	Jana Braunová	Czech Republic	**642**	602					191	**199**				841
11	Valentina Gal	Croatia	610	631	**647**	568			**192**					839
12	Irena Mejač	Slovenia	612	**630**	584				**208**					838
13	Fiona Steiner	Austria	**629**	591	588				**201**					830
14	Jasmina Anđelković	Serbia	**605**	598					205	213	209	**222**		827
15	Anita Méhész	Hungary	**616**	598					204	**210**				826
16	Julia Huber	Austria	621	**629**	583				**192**					821
17	Katalin Tóth	Hungary	598	**606**					**212**					818
18	Ines Maričić	Croatia	615	**622**					**187**	184				809
19	Margot Gribelin	France	**606**	580					**200**	193				806
20	Klaudia Pivková	Slovakia	**587**						**215**					802
21	Patricija Bizjak	Slovenia	596	**596**					203	**204**	190			800
22	Dijana Kormanjoš	Serbia	**588**						**208**					796
23	Laura Runggatscher	Italy	**601**	600	577				**189**	185				790
24	Nicole Plamenig	Austria	**596**	595					186	**192**				788
25	Nicoletta Dudziak	Poland	**593**						190	**192**				785
26	Ljiljana Frenc	Serbia	**584**						**198**					782
27	Marian Saar	Estonia	**570**						**207**					777
28	Heret Ots	Estonia	**568**						201	**204**	179	199	204	772
29	Jenny Smevold	Sweden	**568**						**182**					750
30	Dana Klubertová	Slovakia	**559**						**188**					747
31	Natálie Topičová	Czech Republic	635	610	**664**	595								664
32	Edit Sass	Hungary	594	**633**										633
33	Bente Wiinberg	Denmark	**456**						**170**					626
34	Olivera Čikoš	Serbia	619	609	**621**	588								621
35	Kristina Ljubenković	Serbia	**615**	597										615
36	Alena Bimber	Germany	**608**	556										608
37	Aurélie Remy	France	**606**	586										606
38	Milana Pavlić	Croatia	**602**	597										602
39	Marija Ahačič Premrl	Slovenia	**602**	577										602
40	Daniela Lăcătuşu	Romania	**595**	554										595
41	Dana Martinkevič	Czech Republic	**595**	592										595
42	Vlasta Kohoutová	Czech Republic	**593**											593
43	Maja Plavčak	Slovenia	**592**											592
44	Christina Neundörfer	Germany	**583**											583
44	Vladimíra Vávrová	Slovakia	**583**											583
46	Andrea Tóth	Hungary	**582**											582
47	Aleksandra Bonk	Poland	**578**											578
48	Nataša Ravnić	Croatia	**577**											577
49	Klara Sedlar	Croatia	**577**											577
50	Dominika Zygarłowska	Poland	**575**											575
51	Amélie Zind	France	**575**											575
52	Hermina Lukač	Serbia	**572**											572
53	Alina Ştefania Sanda	Romania	**571**											571
54	Celine Zenker	Germany	**571**											571
55	Petra Pečovnik	Slovenia	**571**											571
56	Réka Fekete	Romania	**567**											567
57	Jana Poliaková	Slovakia	**561**											561
58	Katarína Večeríkova	Slovakia	**553**											553
59	Dominika Kyselicová	Slovakia	**549**											549
60	Nathalie Neubauer	Austria	**549**											549
61	Beatrix Nagy	Hungary	**535**											535
62	Maria Jönnsson	Sweden							**166**					166

Key
Colour	Result
Red	Do not qualify (DNQ)
White	Do not participate (DNP)
Blank	No result (-)
Blank	Whithdrawn (WD)
Text formatting	Meaning
**Bold**	Best result
Italics	Comment
