= 2022 World Singles Ninepin Bowling Classic Championships – Mixed tandem =

Mixed tandem at the 2022 World Single Ninepin Bowling Classic Championships
- Location: Elva, Estonia
- Dates: 24–25 May 2022
- Competitors: 64 from 15 nations

Medalists
gold medal	Nataša Ravnić; Hrvoje Marinović	Croatia
silver medal	Edit Sass; Zoltán Móricz	Hungary
bronze medal	Fiona Steiner; Markus Vsetecka	Austria
bronze medal	Venesa Bogdanović; Alen Kujundžić	Croatia

The mixed tandem event at the 2022 World Singles Ninepin Bowling Classic Championships was held in Elva, Estonia on 24–25 May 2022.

The world champions became the Croats Nataša Ravnić and Hrvoje Marinović. The silver medals went to Hungarians Edit Sass and Zoltán Móricz, while the bronzes were won by Austrians Fiona Steiner and Markus Vsetecka, and Croats Venesa Bogdanović and Alen Kujundžić.

== Results ==
=== Starting places ===
The starting places have been allocated on the basis of each nation achievements during the previous championships.

	(Austria) AUT	(Bosnia and Herzegovina) BIH	(Croatia) CRO	(Czech Republic) CZE	(Denmark) DEN	(Estonia) EST	(France) FRA	(Germany) GER	(Hungary) HUN	(Italy) ITA	(Poland) POL	(Romania) ROU	(Slovenia) SLO	(Serbia) SRB	(Slovakia) SVK	(Sweden) SWE	Total
Number of seeds	1+2	0	1+1	1+1	1	1	1+1	1+1	1+1	1+1	1+1	1+2	1+2	1+2	1+2	1	32

=== Schedule ===
The players were drawn into bouts with the reservation that competitors from the same country can not play in the first round against each other.

Round of 32 - Tuesday, 24 May

Match #	Lanes	Nation 1	Player 1	Score	Nation 2	Player 2	Set 1	Set 2	SV
1st unit 19:40 (EEST)
MIX 1	1 – 2	Romania	Alina Ştefania Sanda; Horatiu Bogdan Dudas	1 - 1	Slovakia	Dana Klubertová; Bystrik Vadović	136 - 145	158 - 142	31 - 22
MIX 2	3 – 4	Croatia	Nataša Ravnić; Hrvoje Marinović	2 - 0	Romania	Daniela Lăcătuşu; Bogdan Tudorie	162 - 125	148 - 124	—N/a
MIX 3	5 – 6	Slovenia	Marija Ahačič Premrl; Blaž Čerin	0 - 2	Serbia	Kristina Ljubenković; Čongor Baranj	142 - 149	139 - 158	—N/a
MIX 4	7 – 8	Slovakia	Jana Poliaková; Peter Nemček	1 - 1	Italy	Annemarie Innerhofer; Aaron Peer Pratzer	169 - 151	104 - 151	26 - 32
2nd unit 20:20 (EEST)
MIX 5	1 – 2	Serbia	Hermina Lukač; Adrijan Lončarević	1 - 1	Croatia	Venesa Bogdanović; Alen Kujundžić	157 - 140	139 - '143	28 - 30
MIX 6	3 – 4	Poland	Aleksandra Bonk; Michał Szulc	2 - 0	Slovenia	Maja Plavčak; Timi Jurančič	130 - 118	153 - 149	—N/a
MIX 7	5 – 6	Austria	Nicole Plamenig; Philipp Vsetecka	1 - 1	Hungary	Andrea Tóth; Levente Kakuk	157 - 146	148 - 152	21 - 18
MIX 8	7 – 8	Serbia	Olivera Čikoš; Radovan Vlajkov	0 - 2	Italy	Laura Runggatscher; Armin Egger	143 - 154	147 - 152	—N/a
3rd unit 21:00 (EEST)
MIX 9	1 – 2	Poland	Dominika Zygarłowska; Karol Sellmann	1 - 1	Austria	Julia Huber; Lukas Huber	148 - 144	134 - 160	28 - 25
MIX 10	3 – 4	Germany	Celine Zenker; Manuel Weiß	2 - 0	Czech Republic	Vlasta Kohoutová; Petr Dobeš	147 - 134	148 - 140	—N/a
MIX 11	5 – 6	Germany	Alena Bimber; Daniel Barth	2 - 0	Estonia	Heret Ots; Markko Abel	167 - 141	157 - 126	—N/a
MIX 12	7 – 8	Austria	Fiona Steiner; Markus Vsetecka	1 - 1	France	Aurélie Remy; Cyril Hugele	127 - 137	154 - 142	28 - 26
4th unit 21:40 (EEST)
MIX 13	1 – 2	Czech Republic	Natálie Topičová; Jaroslav Hažva	0 - 2	Romania	Luminita Viorica Dogaru; Ion Cercel	123 - 128	139 - 145	—N/a
MIX 14	3 – 4	France	Amélie Zind; Frédéric Koell	0 - 2	Slovakia	Klaudia Pivková; Lukáš Juris	136 - 144	137 - 139	—N/a
MIX 15	5 – 6	Slovenia	Eva Sajko; Franci Velišček	1 - 1	Hungary	Edit Sass; Zoltán Móricz	140 - 153	152 - 146	20 - 33
MIX 16	7 – 8	Denmark	Bente Wiinberg; Martin Folmer Hansen	1 - 1	Sweden	Maria Jönnsson; Juha Sahlman	122 - 131	131 - 126	20 - 25

Round of 16 - Wednesday, 25 May

Match #	Lanes	Nation 1	Player 1	Score	Nation 2	Player 2	Set 1	Set 2	SV
1st unit 14:00 (EEST)
MIX 17	5 – 6	Romania	Alina Ştefania Sanda; Horatiu Bogdan Dudas	0 - 2	Croatia	Nataša Ravnić; Hrvoje Marinović	143 - 150	120 - 157	—N/a
MIX 18	1 – 2	Serbia	Kristina Ljubenković; Čongor Baranj	1 - 1	Italy	Annemarie Innerhofer; Aaron Peer Pratzer	161 - 137	140 - 150	28 - 33
MIX 19	7 – 8	Croatia	Venesa Bogdanović; Alen Kujundžić	2 - 0	Poland	Aleksandra Bonk; Michał Szulc	152 - 145	145 - 135	—N/a
MIX 20	3 – 4	Austria	Nicole Plamenig; Philipp Vsetecka	0 - 2	Italy	Laura Runggatscher; Armin Egger	153 - 170	130 - 137	—N/a
2nd unit 14:40 (EEST)
MIX 21	5 – 6	Poland	Dominika Zygarłowska; Karol Sellmann	0 - 0	Germany	Celine Zenker; Manuel Weiß	152 - 158	132 - 161	—N/a
MIX 22	1 – 2	Germany	Alena Bimber; Daniel Barth	0 - 2	Austria	Fiona Steiner; Markus Vsetecka	147 - 161	153 - 156	—N/a
MIX 23	7 – 8	Romania	Luminita Viorica Dogaru; Ion Cercel	1 - 1	Slovakia	Klaudia Pivková; Lukáš Juris	140^{5} - 140^{6}	142 - 141	30 - 32
MIX 24	3 – 4	Hungary	Edit Sass; Zoltán Móricz	2 - 0	Sweden	Maria Jönnsson; Juha Sahlman	172 - 137	162 - 131	—N/a

Quarterfinals - Wednesday, 25 May

Match #	Lanes	Nation 1	Player 1	Score	Nation 2	Player 2	Set 1	Set 2	SV
1st unit 15:20 (EEST)
MIX 25	3 – 4	Croatia	Nataša Ravnić; Hrvoje Marinović	2 - 0	Italy	Annemarie Innerhofer; Aaron Peer Pratzer	156 - 142	151 - 135	—N/a
MIX 26	1 – 2	Croatia	Venesa Bogdanovic; Alen Kujundžić	2 - 0	Italy	Laura Runggatscher; Armin Egger	148 - 133	171 - 151	—N/a
MIX 27	7 – 8	Germany	Celine Zenker; Manuel Weiß	1 - 1	Austria	Fiona Steiner; Markus Vsetecka	160 - 146	132 - 152	24 - 28
MIX 28	5 – 6	Slovakia	Klaudia Pivková; Lukáš Juris	0 - 2	Hungary	Edit Sass; Zoltán Móricz	142 - 144	138 - 155	—N/a

Semifinals - Wednesday, 25 May

Match #	Lanes	Nation 1	Player 1	Score	Nation 2	Player 2	Set 1	Set 2	SV
16:00 (EEST)
MIX 29	5 – 6	Croatia	Nataša Ravnić; Hrvoje Marinović	2 - 0	Croatia	Venesa Bogdanović; Alen Kujundžić	169 - 156	176 - 168	—N/a
MIX 30	3 – 4	Austria	Fiona Steiner; Markus Vsetecka	1 - 1	Hungary	Edit Sass; Zoltán Móricz	170 - 148	167 - 168	22 - 31

Final - Wednesday, 25 May

Match #	Lanes	Nation 1	Player 1	Score	Nation 2	Player 2	Set 1	Set 2	SV
16:40 (EEST)
MIX 31	4 – 5	Croatia	Nataša Ravnić; Hrvoje Marinović	2 - 0	Hungary	Edit Sass; Zoltán Móricz	161 - 140	168 - 145	—N/a

=== Bracket ===
1st Round
(Romania) Alina Ştefania Sanda (Romania) Bogdan Dudas Horatiu	136	158	31
(Slovakia) Dana Klubertová (Slovakia) Bystrik Vadović	145	142	22
(Croatia) Nataša Ravnić (Croatia) Hrvoje Marinović	162	148
(Romania) Daniela Lăcătuşu (Romania) Bogdan Tudorie	125	124
(Slovenia) Marija Ahačič Premrl (Slovenia) Blaž Čerin	142	139
(Serbia) Kristina Ljubenković (Serbia) Čongor Baranj	149	158
(Slovakia) Jana Poliaková (Slovakia) Peter Nemček	169	104	26
(Italy) Annemarie Innerhofer (Italy) Aaron Peer Pratzer	151	151	32
(Serbia) Hermina Lukač (Serbia) Adrijan Lončarević	157	139	28
(Croatia) Venesa Bogdanović (Croatia) Alen Kujundžić	140	153	30
(Poland) Aleksandra Bonk (Poland) Michał Szluc	130	153
(Slovenia) Maja Plavčak (Slovenia) Timi Jurančič	118	149
(Austria) Nicole Plamenig (Austria) Philipp Vsetecka	157	148	21
(Hungary) Andrea Tóth (Hungary) Levente Kakuk	146	152	18
(Serbia) Olivera Čikoš (Serbia) Radovan Vlajkov	143	147
(Italy) Laura Runggatscher (Italy) Armin Egger	154	152
(Poland) Dominika Zygarłowska (Poland) Karol Sellmann	148	134	28
(Austria) Julia Huber (Austria) Lukas Huber	144	160	25
(Germany) Celine Zenker (Germany) Manuel Weiß	147	148
(Czech Republic) Vlasta Kohoutová (Czech Republic) Petr Dobeš	134	140
(Germany) Alena Bimber (Germany) Daniel Barth	167	157
(Estonia) Heret Ots (Estonia) Markko Abel	141	126
(Austria) Fiona Steiner (Austria) Markus Vsetecka	127	154	28
(France) Aurélie Remy (France) Cyril Hugele	137	142	26
(Czech Republic) Natálie Topičová (Czech Republic) Jaroslav Hažva	123	139
(Romania) Luminiţa Viorica Dogaru (Romania) Ion Cercel	128	145
(France) Amélie Zind (France) Frédéric Koell	136	137
(Slovakia) Klaudia Pivková (Slovakia) Lukáš Juris	144	139
(Slovenia) Eva Sajko (Slovenia) Franci Velišček	140	152	20
(Hungary) Edit Sass (Hungary) Zoltán Móricz	153	146	33
(Denmark) Bente Wiinberg (Denmark) Martin Folmer Hansen	122	131	20
(Sweden) Maria Jönnsson (Sweden) Juha Sahlman	131	126	25

2nd Round
(Romania) Alina Ştefania Sanda (Romania) Bogdan Dudas Horatiu	143	120
(Croatia) Nataša Ravnić (Croatia) Hrvoje Marinović	150	157
(Serbia) Kristina Ljubenković (Serbia) Čongor Baranj	161	140	28
(Italy) Annemarie Innerhofer (Italy) Aaron Peer Pratzer	137	150	33
(Croatia) Venesa Bogdanović (Croatia) Alen Kujundžić	152	145
(Poland) Aleksandra Bonk (Poland) Michał Szluc	145	135
(Austria) Nicole Plamenig (Austria) Philipp Vsetecka	153	130
(Italy) Laura Runggatscher (Italy) Armin Egger	170	137
(Poland) Dominika Zygarłowska (Poland) Karol Sellmann	152	132
(Germany) Celine Zenker (Germany) Manuel Weiß	158	161
(Germany) Alena Bimber (Germany) Daniel Barth	147	153
(Austria) Fiona Steiner (Austria) Markus Vsetecka	161	156
(Romania) Luminiţa Viorica Dogaru (Romania) Ion Cercel	140^{5}	142	30
(Slovakia) Klaudia Pivková (Slovakia) Lukáš Juris	140^{6}	141	32
(Hungary) Edit Sass (Hungary) Zoltán Móricz	172	162
(Sweden) Maria Jönnsson (Sweden) Juha Sahlman	137	131

Quarterfinals
(Croatia) Nataša Ravnić (Croatia) Hrvoje Marinović	156	151
(Italy) Annemarie Innerhofer (Italy) Aaron Peer Pratzer	142	135
(Croatia) Venesa Bogdanović (Croatia) Alen Kujundžić	148	171
(Italy) Laura Runggatscher (Italy) Armin Egger	133	151
(Germany) Celine Zenker (Germany) Manuel Weiß	160	132	24
(Austria) Fiona Steiner (Austria) Markus Vsetecka	146	152	28
(Slovakia) Klaudia Pivková (Slovakia) Lukáš Juris	142	138
(Hungary) Edit Sass (Hungary) Zoltán Móricz	144	155

Semifinals
(Croatia) Nataša Ravnić (Croatia) Hrvoje Marinović	169	176
(Croatia) Venesa Bogdanović (Croatia) Alen Kujundžić	156	168
(Austria) Fiona Steiner (Austria) Markus Vsetecka	170	167	22
(Hungary) Edit Sass (Hungary) Zoltán Móricz	148	168	31

Finals
(Croatia) Nataša Ravnić (Croatia) Hrvoje Marinović	161	168
(Hungary) Edit Sass (Hungary) Zoltán Móricz	140	145
