= 2022 World U23 Ninepin Bowling Classic Championships =

21st World U23 Ninepin Bowling Classic Championships
- Host city: Elva
- Country: Estonia
- Nations: 14
- Athletes: c. 200
- Events: 11
- Opening: May 17, 2022
- Closing: May 22, 2022

Location in Europe
Location in Estonia

The 2022 World U23 Ninepin Bowling Classic Championships is the twenty first edition of competition and hold in Elva, Estonia, from 17 to 22 May 2022.

== Participating nations ==
- Austria
- Croatia
- Czech Republic
- Denmark
- Estonia
- Germany
- France
- Hungary
- Italy
- Poland
- Romania
- Serbia
- Slovakia
- Slovenia

== Schedule ==
Eleven events will be held.

All times are local (UTC+3).

Date	Time	Event
17 May 2022	19:30	Opening ceremony
18 May 2022	09:00	Women's team
19 May 2022	08:00	Men's team
20 May 2022	09:30	Mixed tandem
20 May 2022	12:30	Sprint men & women
21 May 2022	10:00	Tandem men & women
22 May 2022	08:00	Singles final
22 May 2022	15:30	Award and closing ceremony

== Medal summary ==
=== Medal table ===
Rank	Nation	Gold	Silver	Bronze	Total
1	Germany (GER)	7	4	5	16
2	Austria (AUT)	2	2	2	6
3	Slovenia (SLO)	1	2	2	5
4	Croatia (CRO)	1	1	3	5
5	Poland (POL)	0	1	1	2
6	Serbia (SRB)	0	1	0	1
7	France (FRA)	0	0	1	1
7	Romania (ROU)	0	0	1	1
7	Slovakia (SVK)	0	0	1	1
Totals (9 entries)		11	11	16	38

=== Men ===
Event	Gold	Silver	Bronze
Single	Simon Axthelm; Germany	Tim Brachtel; Germany	Daniel Barth; Germany
Combined	Simon Axthelm; Germany	Matthias Zatschkowitsch; Austria	Tim Brachtel; Germany
Sprint	Matthias Zatschkowitsch; Austria	Luka Požega; Croatia	Jan Sandler; Germany Gašper Urbas; Slovenia
Tandem	Daniel Barth; Tim Brachtel; Germany	Lukas Temistokle; Matthias Zatschkowitsch; Austria	Fran Hećimović; Toni Ljubić; Croatia Thomas Brétar; Florian Menrath; France
Team	Germany; Simon Axthelm; Daniel Barth; Tim Brachtel; Lukas Funk; Patrick Lüftner; Michel Raven; Jan Sandler	Poland; Jakub Cwojdziński; Mateusz Goździk; Szymon Kosz; Jakub Kuryło; Gracjan Machaj; Wiktor Nowak; Gabriel Zastawnik	Austria; Oliver Christ; Andreas Eisl; Dominik Lieb; Maximilian Monthaler; Alexander Müllner; Lukas Temistokle; Alexander Walch; Matthias Zatschkowitsch

=== Women ===
Event	Gold	Silver	Bronze
Single	Luisa Ebert; Germany	Iris Zoran; Slovenia	Bianca Zimmermann; Germany
Combined	Bianca Zimmermann; Germany	Luisa Ebert; Germany	Vladimíra Vávrová; Slovakia
Sprint	Amela Nicol Imširović; Croatia	Bianca Zimmermann; Germany	Nicola Kobiór; Poland Nataša Radić; Slovenia
Tandem	Sara Rotvar; Amanda Zalar; Slovenia	Luisa Ebert; Bianca Zimmermann; Germany	Venesa Bogdanović; Amela Nicol Imširović; Croatia Saskia Gubitz; Selina Thiem; Germany
Team	Germany; Luisa Ebert; Selina Fuhrmann; Saskia Gubitz; Melina Ruß; Jennifer Sommer; Selina Thiem; Bianca Zimmermann	Slovenia; Špela Kunčič; Tina Mržljak; Ana Oder; Nataša Radić; Tea Repnik; Sara Rovtar; Amanda Zalar; Iris Zoran	Croatia; Venesa Bogdanović; Anamarija Grdić; Amela Nicol Imširović; Matea Juričić; Sara Pejak; Paula Polanšćak; Tamara Sinković; Magdalena Škreblin

=== Mixed ===
Event	Gold	Silver	Bronze
Tandem	Franziska Gstrein; Lukas Temistokle; Austria	Višnja Živanović; Ilija Jevremović; Serbia	Laura Kollenda; Matthias Zatschkowitsch; Austria Bernadett Seres; Roberto Daniel Laposi; Romania
