= Leopold Hansen =

Estonian actor and theater director (1879–1964)

- Born: November 27, 1879; Iravere, Governorate of Livonia, Russian Empire
- Died: February 15, 1964 (aged 84); Elva, then part of Estonian SSR, Soviet Union
- Resting place: Elva Cemetery
- Occupations: Actor and theater director

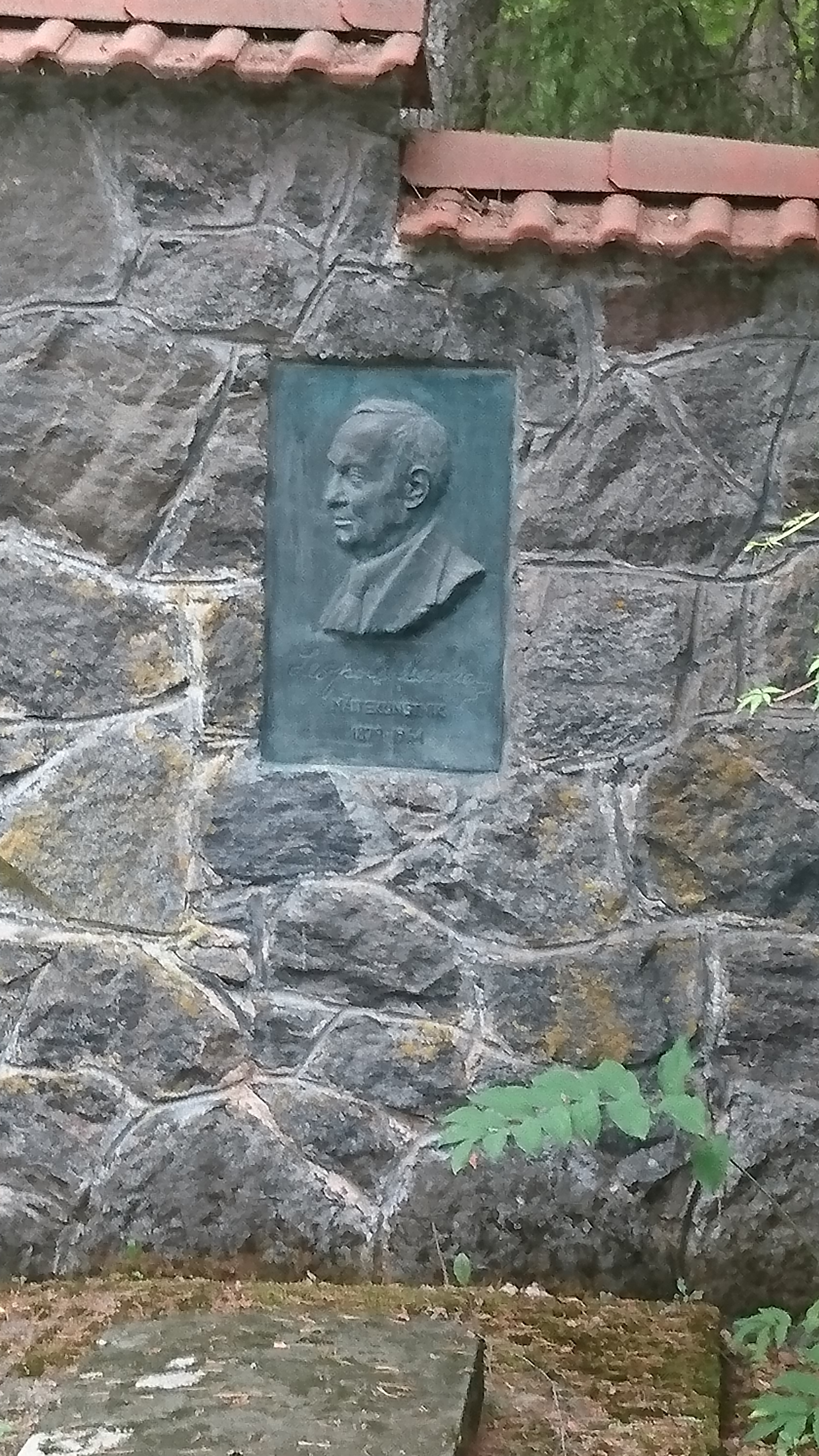
The grave of Estonian actor Leopold Hansen at Elva cemetery, bas-relief

Leopold-Ottomar Hansen (November 27, 1879 – February 15, 1964) was an Estonian actor and theater director.

== Early life ==
Leopold Hansen was born at the Antsu farm in Iravere, the son of Mart Hansen (1846–1907) and Maria née Tido (1856–1951). In 1886, the family moved to Jõgeva. Hansen attended school for only a few years, and he worked as a shepherd as a child.

== Career ==
Hansen started his career in the theater in 1899 as a choir singer in the theater troupe of August Wiera. From 1903 to 1905, he acted in and directed the Imanta company in Riga. He worked at the Vanemuine Theater in Tartu from 1906 to 1928. Among his best-known roles were Pliuhkam in Oskar Luts's comedy Kapsapea (The Cabbage), and Piibeleht in Eduard Vilde's comedy Pisuhänd.

In the 1920s, he also worked as a theater director. He worked at the Drama Studio Theater in Tallinn from 1933 onward, and from 1944 to 1961 again at the Vanemuine Theater.

== Works ==
Hansen published poems (under the pseudonyms Nõmmelill and L.H.) and stories, and he wrote plays, couplets, and farces for parties and memoirs.

- 1903: Uus Kain. Algupäraline jutustus kaugelt minewikust (The New Cain. An Original Tale from the Distant Past). Tallinn, 96 pages
- 1917: Abielu vaenlane. Naljamäng lauludega 1 vaatuses (The Enemy of Marriage. A Play with Songs in 1 Act). Music by Juhan Simm; mimeographed reproduction. Yuryev (Tartu), 24 pages
- 1917: Rõõmuhallikas: kerjuste nali 1 vaatuses (A Source of Joy: A Beggars' Comedy in One Act)
- 1924: Karjeristid. Naljamäng kolmes waatuses (The Careerists. A Comedy in Three Acts). Tartu, 72 pages
- 1925: Ühewaatuslised (naljamängud) (One-Act Play: Comedies). Tartu, 98 pages
- 1925: Vahilaari valge tuvike: naljamäng lauludega 1 vaatuses (The White Dove of the Guardian: A Comedy with Songs in One Act). Music by Juhan Simm
- 1935: Kaunismäe. Näidend 4 vaatuses (Kaunismäe. A Play in Four Acts). Tartu: Noor-Eesti Kirjastus, 111 pages
- 1940: Minu tee teatrisse. Märkmeid oma 60-nda sünni- ja 40-nda lavategevuse aasta puhul (My Way to the Theater. Notes on the Occasion of My Sixtieth Birthday and Fortieth Year of Stage Activity). Tallinn, 178 pages
- 1960: "Vanemuise" radadelt. Mälestusi teatriteelt (From the Paths of Vanemuise. Memories from the Road to the Theater), literary adaptation by Paul Rummo of the book Minu tee teatrisse (My Way to the Theater). Tallinn: Eesti Riiklik Kirjastus, 208 pages
- 1963: Karjapoiss on kuningas. Mälestuspilte elust ja inimestest (The Shepherd Boy is the King. Memories of Life and People). Tallinn: Eesti Riiklik Kirjastus, 140 pages

== Filmography ==
- 1927: Noored kotkad

== Awards and recognitions ==
- 1946: Meritorious Artist of the Estonian SSR
- 1957: People's Artist of the Estonian SSR
- First Honorary Citizen of the Town of Elva

== Legacy ==
From 1969 to 2012, the Leopold Hansen Home Museum operated in the house that he built.
