= Lake Verevi =

Lake in Estonia

- Verevi järv (Estonian)
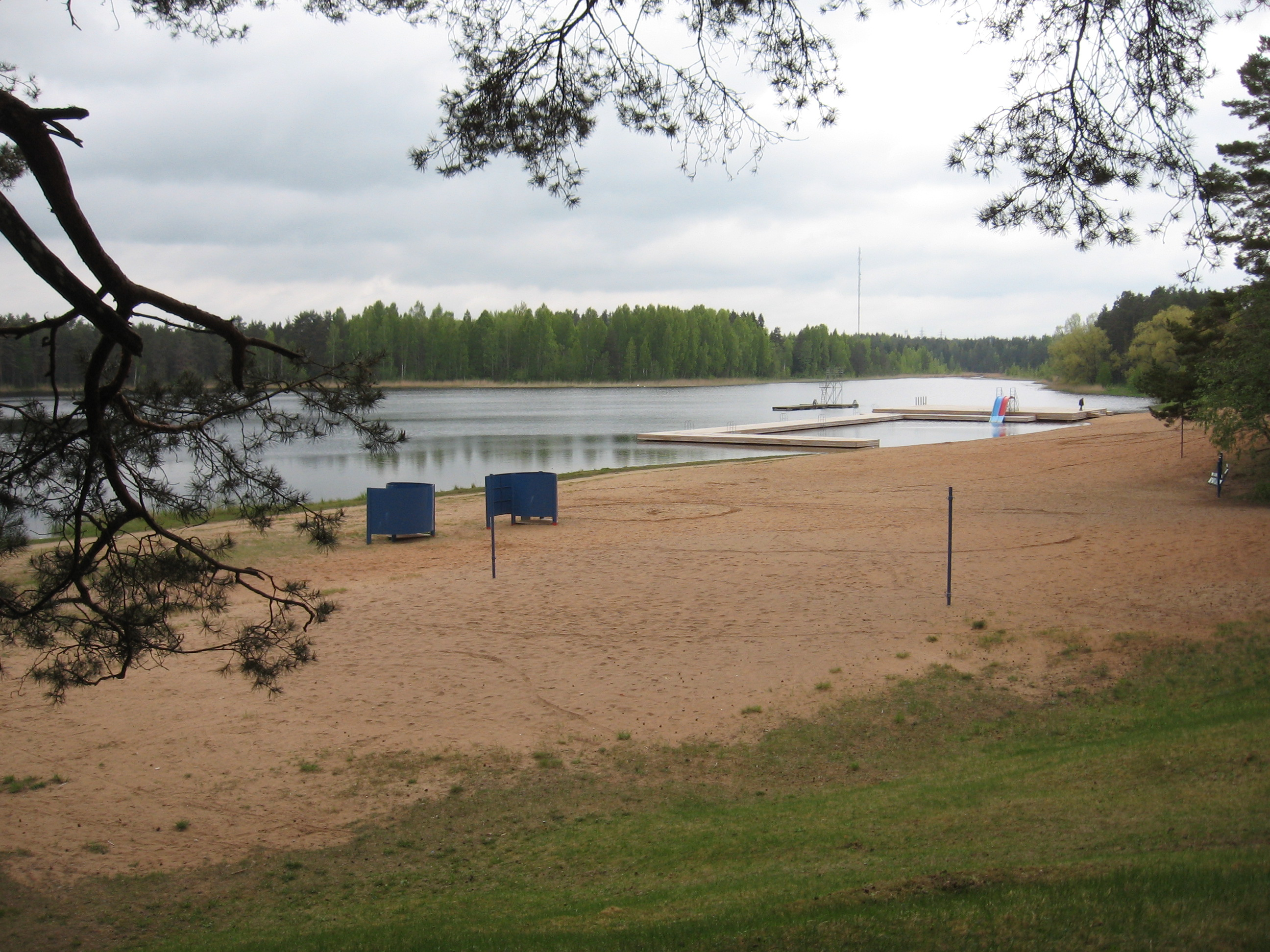

- Location within Estonia
- Location: Elva, Tartu County, Estonia
- Coordinates: 58°13′52″N 26°24′20″E
- Type: Eutrophic
- Primary inflows: Käo Creek
- Primary outflows: Kavilda River (to Emajõgi)
- Catchment area: 110 hectares (270 acres)
- Basin countries: Estonia
- Max. length: 930 meters (3,050 ft)
- Max. width: 320 meters (1,050 ft)
- Surface area: 12.4 hectares (31 acres)
- Average depth: 3.3 meters (11 ft)
- Max. depth: 10.4 meters (34 ft)
- Water volume: 414,000 cubic meters (14,600,000 cu ft)
- Shore length^{1}: 2,610 meters (8,560 ft)
- Surface elevation: 49.7 meters (163 ft)
- Settlements: Elva
- ^{1} Shore length is not a well-defined measure.

Lake Verevi (Estonian: Verevi järv, also known as Elva järv or Elva Suurjärv) is a lake in southern Estonia. It is located in the town of Elva.

== Physical description ==
The lake has an area of 12.4 hectares (31 acres). The lake has an average depth of 3.3 meters (11 ft) and a maximum depth of 10.4 meters (34 ft). It is 930 meters (3,050 ft) long, and its shoreline measures 2,610 meters (8,560 ft). It has a volume of 414,000 cubic meters (14,600,000 cu ft).

== Facilities ==
There is one main dock, which has two slides (a red one and a blue one), side by side. The big dock has an enclosed area used specifically for swimming. There is a smaller dock about 40 ft. out, which has two diving boards. Nearby there is a life guard house, with first aid and other necessities. There is a lot of tourist attraction during the summer time, with its beautiful area and surrounding forests.

== See also ==
- Lake Arbi, another lake in Elva
- List of lakes of Estonia
