= Ivan Kondakov =

Russian chemist who worked mostly in Estonia

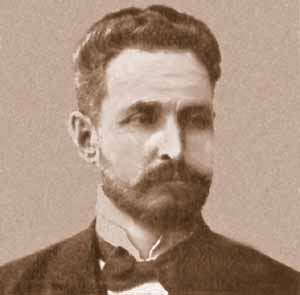
Ivan Kondakov

Ivan Kondakov (1857–1931) was a Russian chemist and a professor of pharmacology, best known for his early research into polymerisation and for inventing a synthetic rubber-like substance in 1901.

In 1886, Kondakov was appointed as a laboratory assistant at the Department of Chemistry at the University of Warsaw. In December 1894, he defended his master's thesis in chemistry "О синтезе под вливнем хлористого цинка в раядь жировых содухания" at St. Petersburg University.

In 1895, he was appointed professor of pharmacy at the Imperial University of Dorpat and worked in Dorpat (Tartu) until 1918.

In 1899, he discovered the catalytic polymerization of dimethylbutadiene into a synthetic rubber-like substance. His research laid the foundation for the production of synthetic rubber in Germany during the First World War.

From 1918 to 1921, he worked at the University of Prague.

He had a house in the professors' district in Elva, where he lived from 1911 to 1918 and 1921 to 1931. He is buried in Elva Cemetery.

== Sources ==
- Estonica: The sciences in Tartu in the 19th century
- Postimees 23 May 2009: Eesti kõige edukamad leiutised
