= Arpi (disambiguation) =

Arpi may refer to:

== Places ==
- Arpi, or Argyrippa, or Argos Hippium, an ancient city of Apulia, Italy
- Arpi, Armenia, formerly Arpa, a town in the Vayots Dzor Province of Armenia
- Lake Arpi, lake located in the Shirak Province of Armenia

== People ==
- Arpi Gabrielyan (born 1989), Armenian broadcaster, model, singer and actress
- Claude Arpi, French-born author, journalist, historian and tibetologist
- Ivar Arpi (born 1982), Swedish reporter, columnist and debater

== Others ==
- ARPI system, a system in the martial arts Arnis. See Arnis#ARPI

== See also ==
- Arbi (disambiguation)
