= Iravere =

Village in Estonia

- Village
- Location within Estonia
- Coordinates: 58.807222222222°N 26.615°E
- Country: Estonia
- County: Jõgeva County
- Parish: Jõgeva Parish
- Time zone: UTC+2 (EET)
  - Summer (DST): UTC+3 (EEST)

Iravere is a village in Jõgeva Parish, Jõgeva County in Estonia.

== Notable people ==
Notable people that were born or lived in Iravere include the following:

- Leopold Hansen (1879–1964), actor and theater director
