= Caspar Austa =

Estonian cyclist

Personal information
- Born: 28 January 1982 (age 44) Elva, then part of Estonian SSR, Soviet Union

Cycling career
- Sport: Cycling
- Disciplines: Road, mountain, cyclo-cross
- Role: Rider

Amateur team
- Tartu Ülikooli Akadeemiline Spordiklubi

Professional teams
- 2007: Rietumu Banka–Riga
- 2008: Dynatek–Latvia

Caspar Austa (born 28 January 1982) is an Estonian cyclist. He competes in road racing, mountain biking, and cyclo-cross.

== Major results ==
2006
1st National Cross-country Championships
2007
2nd SEB Tartu GP
4th Memorial Oleg Dyachenko
2009
1st National Cross-country Championships
2012
2nd National Cross-country Championships
2013
2nd National Cross-country Championships
2014
2nd National Cross-country Championships
2015
3rd National Cross-country Marathon Championships
2016
2nd National Cyclo-cross Championships
2017
3rd National Cyclo-cross Championships
2018
3rd National Cyclo-cross Championships
