= Arbi (name) =

Arbi is both a surname and a given name. Notable people with the name include:

Surname:

- Hariyanto Arbi (born 1972), Indonesian badminton player
- Hastomo Arbi (born 1958), Indonesian badminton player

Given name:

- Arbi Barayev (1973–2001), Chechen warlord
- Arbi Sanit (1939–2021), Indonesian politic scientist
- Arbi Xhelo, Albanian businessman
