= Käo, Tartu County =

Village in Estonia

Käo
- Village
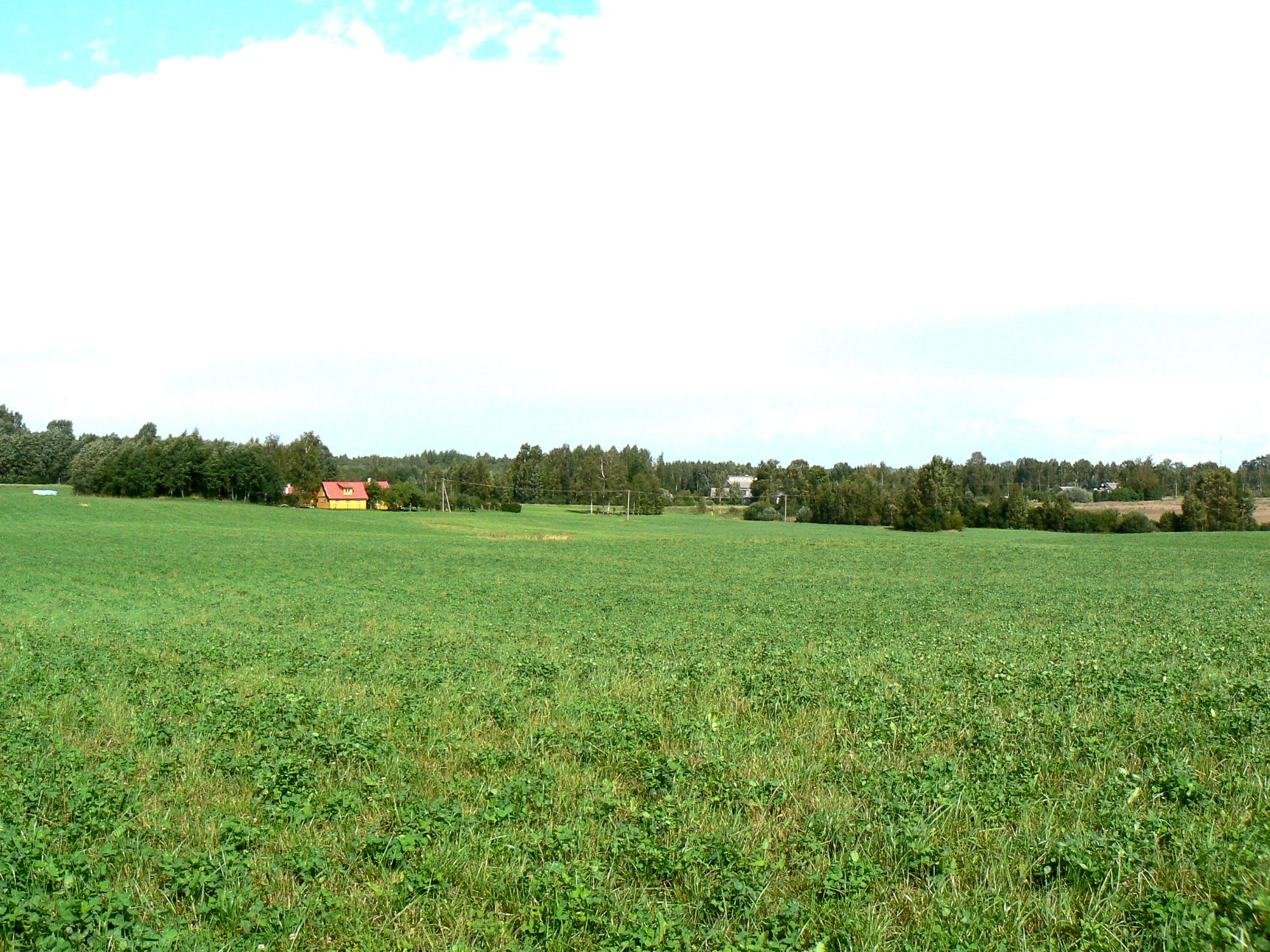

- Location in Estonia
- Coordinates: 58°13′08″N 26°21′18″E
- Country: Estonia
- County: Tartu County
- Municipality: Elva Parish

Population (01.01.2005)
  - Total: 52

Käo is a village in Elva Parish, Tartu County in southern Estonia. It has a population of 52 (as of 1 January 2005).

Käo is the birthplace of Estonian poet and writer Jaan Kärner (1891-1958).
