= Al-Arbi =

Al-Arbi may refer to:

- Abdul Subhan Qureshi
- Mohammed al-Arbi al-Fasi

== See also ==
- Arbi (disambiguation)
