= Hanno Kompus =

Estonian theatre director, art historian, and architect

Hanno Kompus (real name Johannes Kompus, pseudonym HaKo; 4 March 1890 Rannu Parish, Tartu County – 25 October 1974 Montreal, Canada) was an Estonian art and theatre critic, art historian, theatre director and architect.

In 1918, he graduated from Riga Polytechnical Institute. In 1918 he participated on Estonian War of Independence. From 1920 to 1922, he worked at Estonia Theatre. From 1923 to 1936, he was an operatic director at Estonia Theatre. He designed the main gate of Elva Cemetery in 1934. From 1936 until 1940, he worked at Riigi Ringhääling (State Broadcasting). Following the Soviet occupation of Estonia in 1944, he fled to Sweden, where he designed a number of small houses around Stockholm, illustrated Estonian-language books, and worked at several small Estonian-language refugee and expatriate theatres. In 1951, he emigrated to Canada, where he established the Montreali Eesti Teater, where he acted as both a director and an actor.

== Theatre productions ==
- Wagner's "Lohengrin" (1927)
- Aav's "Vikerlased" (1928)
- Nicolai's "Windsori lõbusad naised" (1930)
- Vedro's "Kaupo" (1932)
- Mozart's "Võluflööt" (1936)
