= Kassisaba =

Subdistrict of Tallinn, Estonia

Coordinates: 59°25′55.62″N 24°43′47.94″E

- Subdistrict of Tallinn
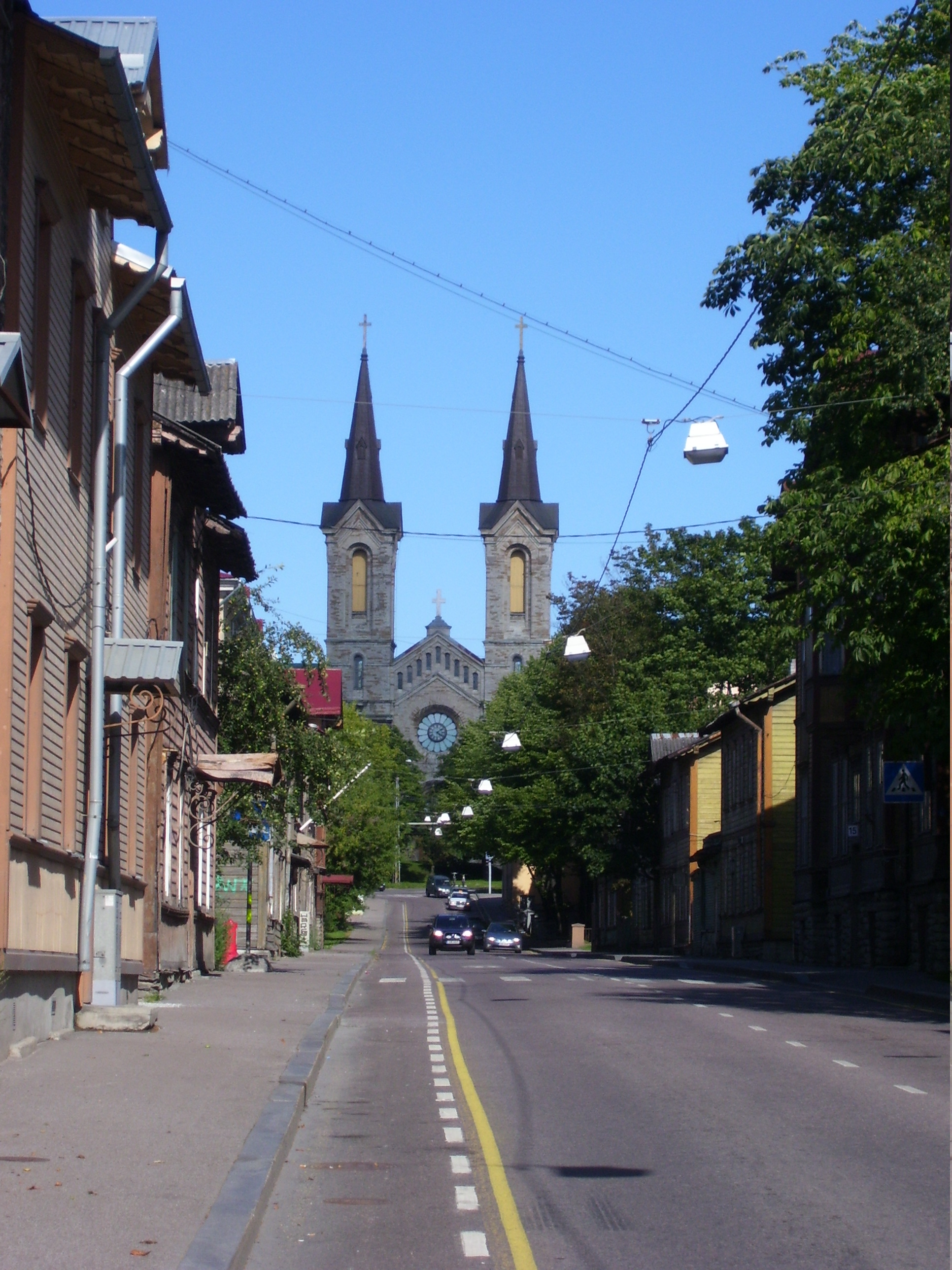
- Charles's Church (Kaarli kirik) seen from Luise Street

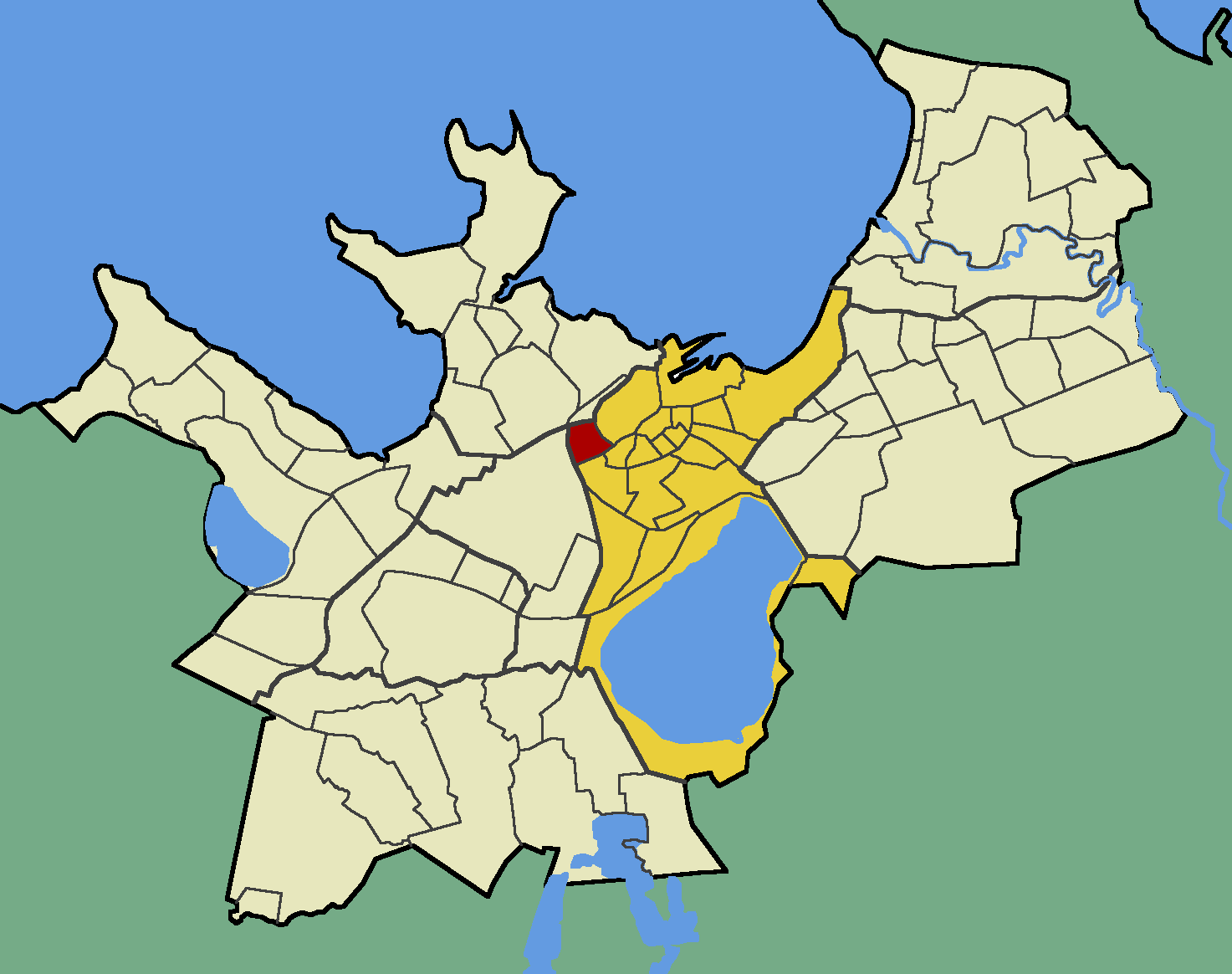
- Kassisaba within the district of Kesklinn (Midtown).
- Country: Estonia
- County: Harju County
- City: Tallinn
- District: Kesklinn

Population (01.01.2023)
  - Total: 4,741

Kassisaba (Estonian for "Cat's Tail") is a subdistrict (asum) in the district of Kesklinn (Midtown), Tallinn, the capital of Estonia. It has a population of 4,741 (As of 1 January 2023).

== Gallery ==
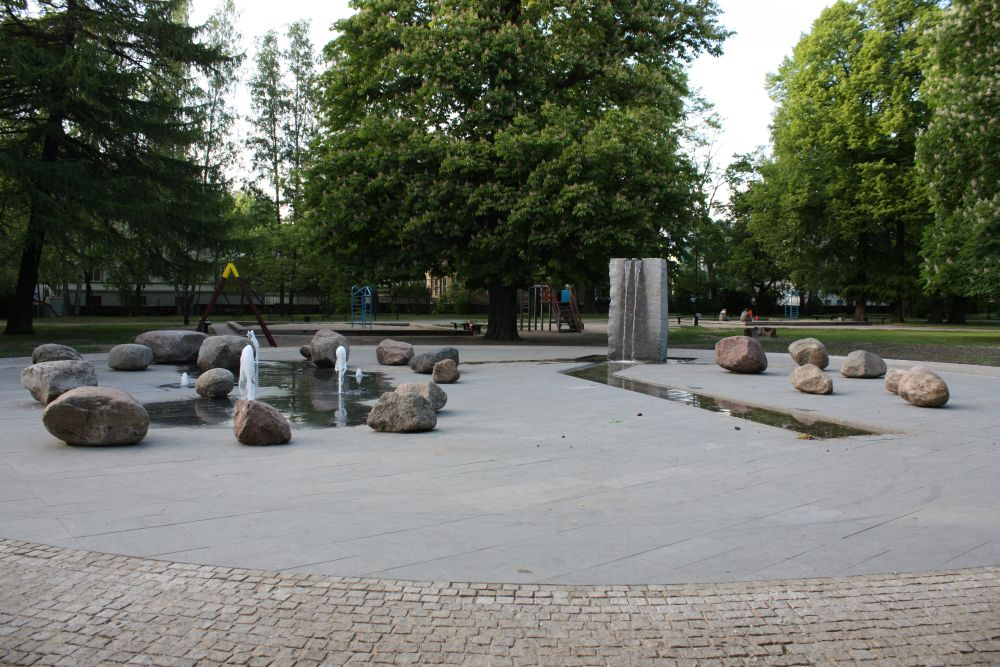
Falgi Park

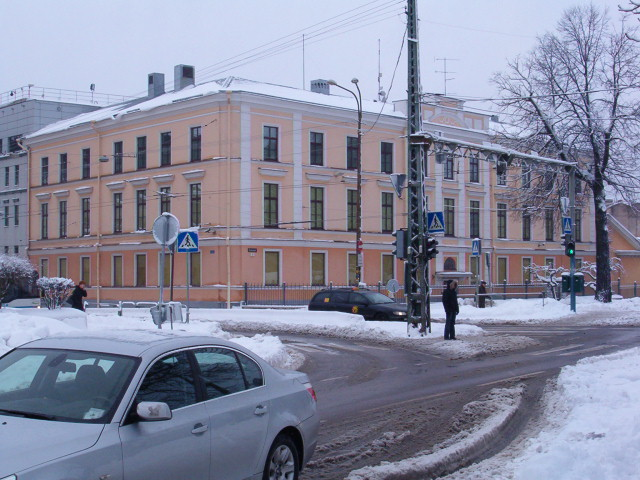
KAPO headquarters

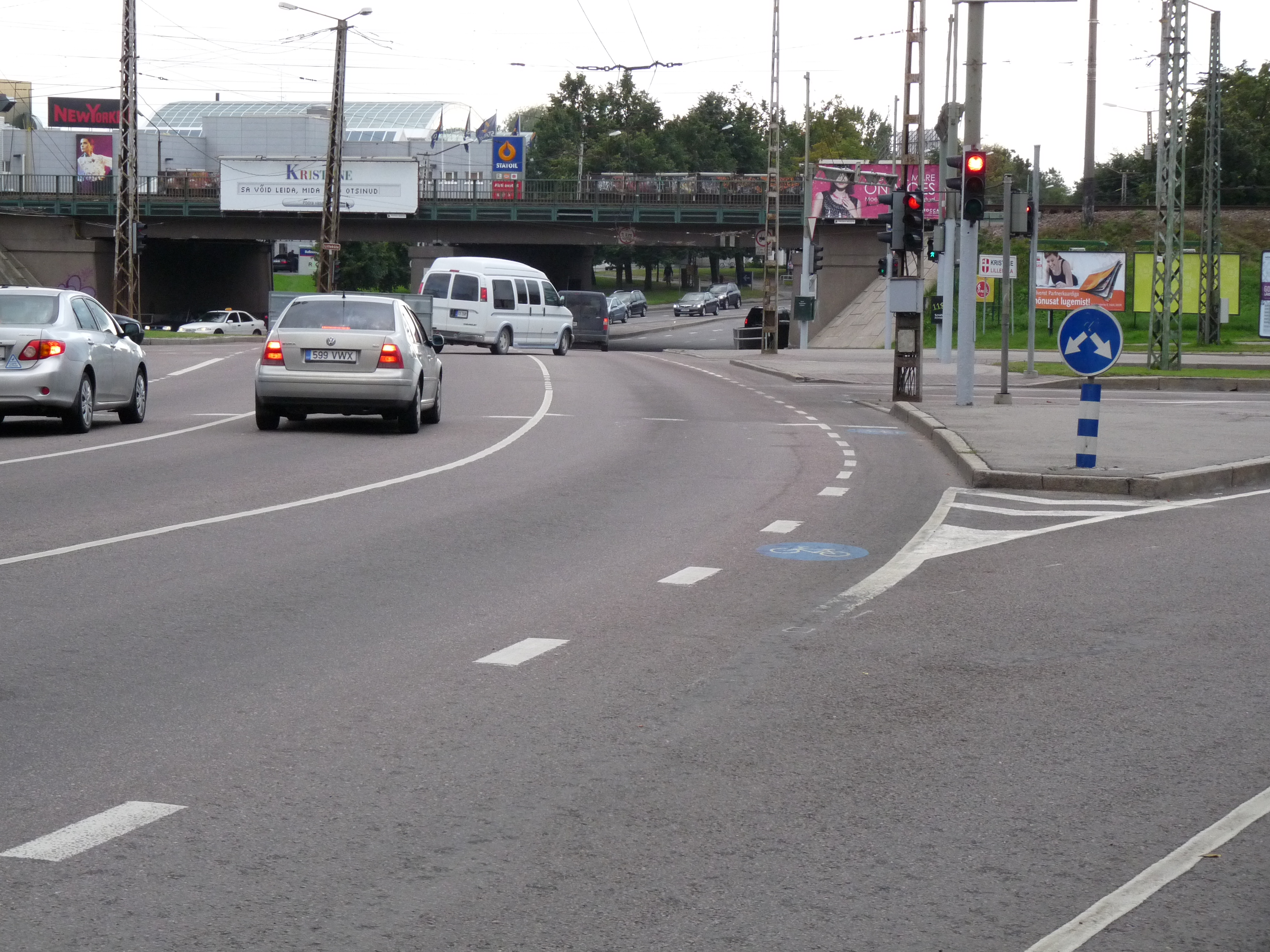
Endla Street
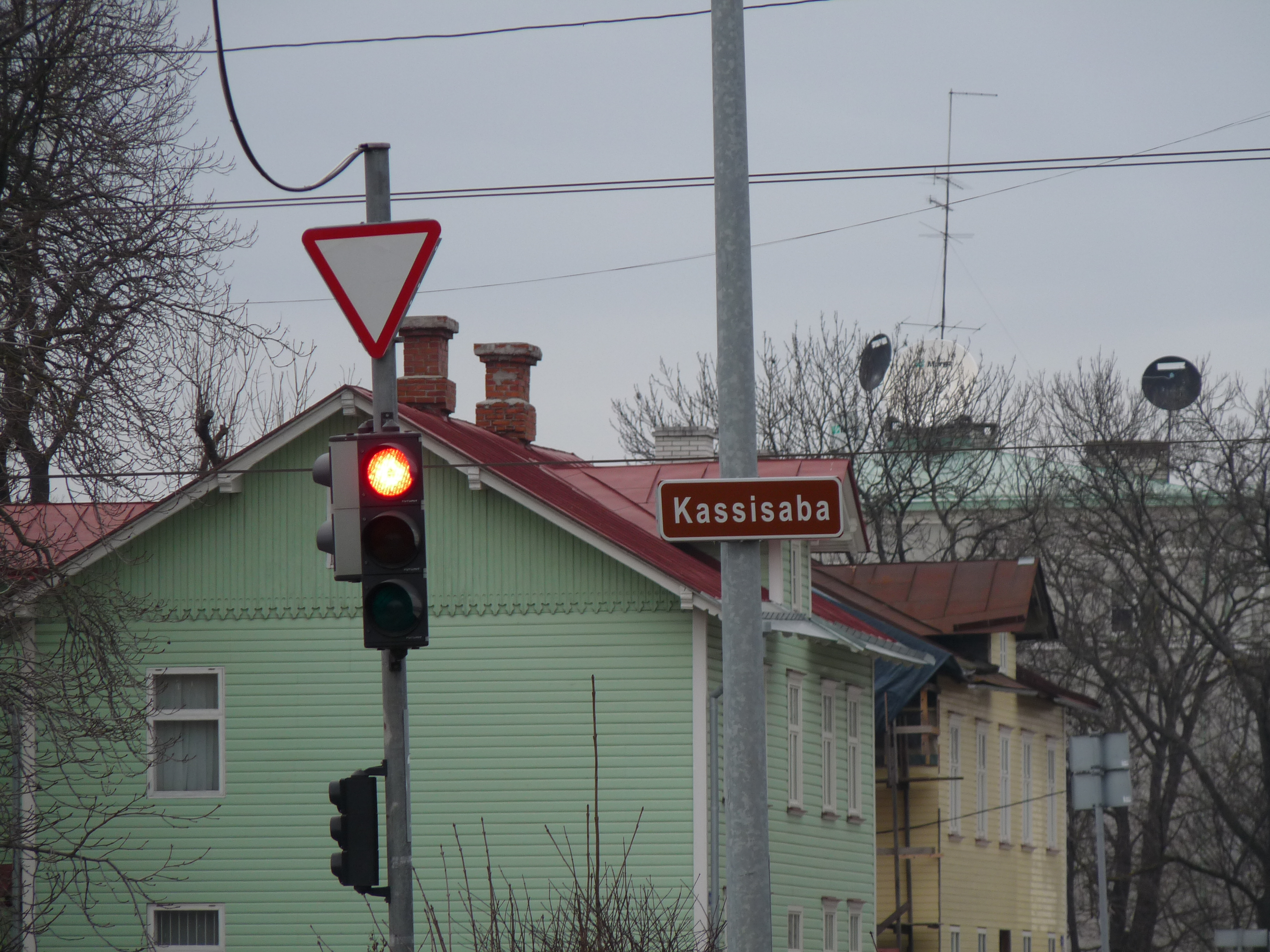
