= Joosep Matjus =

Estonian film director

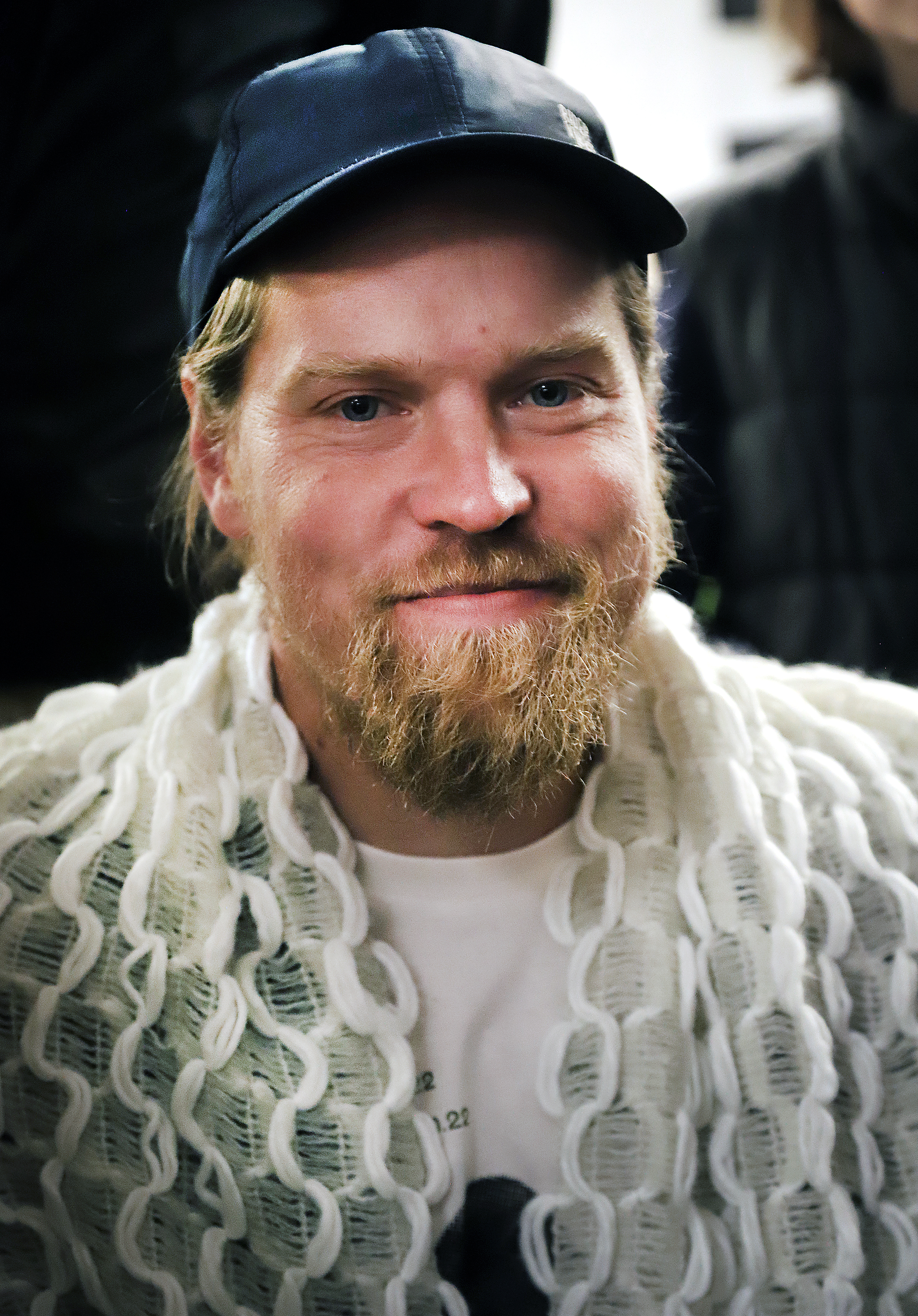
- Born: June 14, 1984 (age 42); Elva, then part of Estonian SSR, Soviet Union
- Occupations: Film director; cinematographer; screenwriter

Joosep Matjus (born 14 June 1984, Elva) is an Estonian film director, cinematographer and scenarist. Matjus is most widely known as a documentary filmmaker.

He is studied at Baltic Film and Media School.

== Selected filmography ==
- 2021 Pingeväljade aednik (documentary film; director, producer, operator)
- 2020 Fred Jüssi. Olemise ilu (documentary film; operator)
- 2018 Tuulte tahutud maa (documentary film; director, scenarist, operator)
- 2014 Kajaka teoreem (documentary film; director, scenarist, operator)
- 2009 Vanamees ja põder (documentary film; director, scenarist, operator)
