= Jaan Kärner =

Estonian poet and writer (1891–1958)

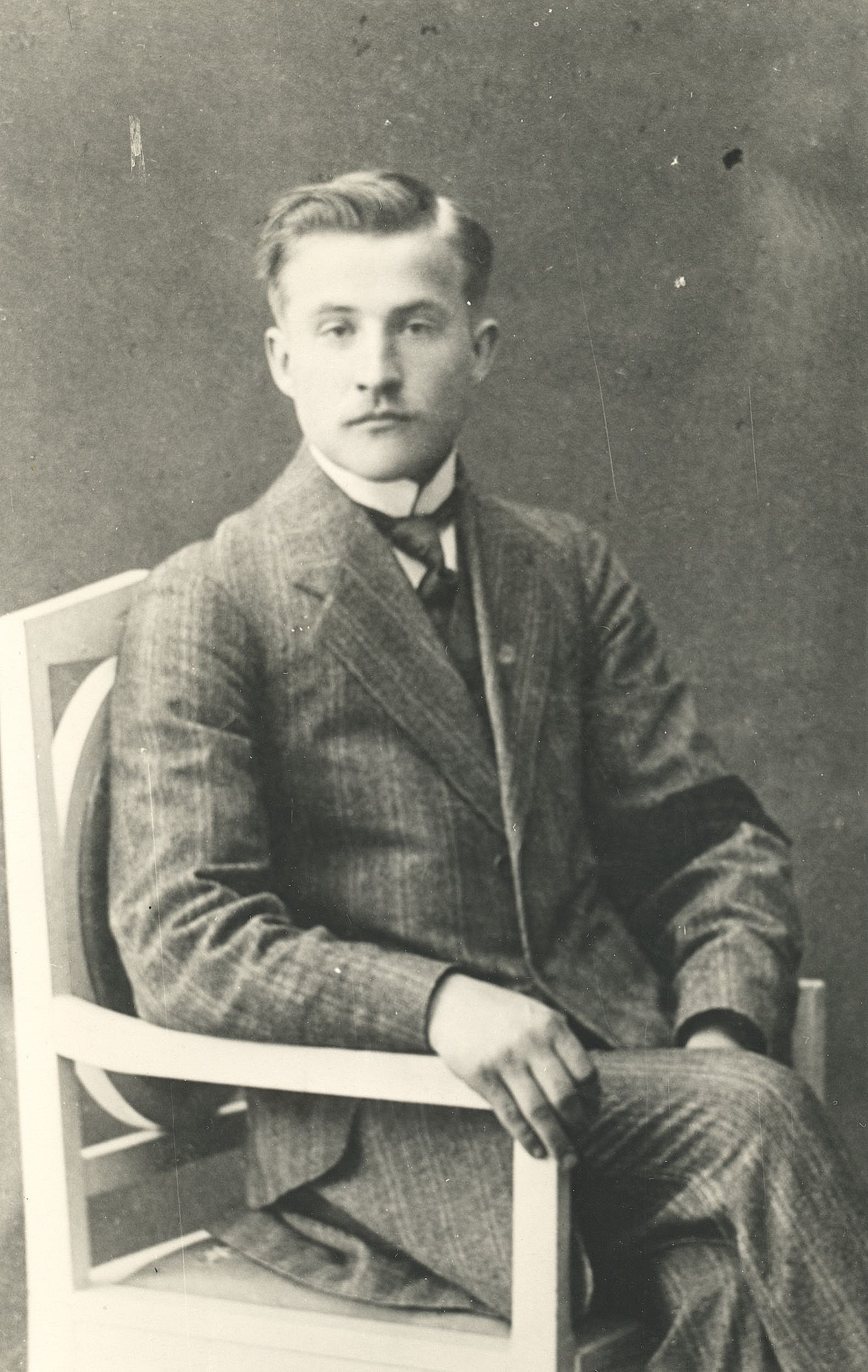
- Kärner in 1911
- Born: 27 May 1891; Käo, Kirepi Parish, Kreis Dorpat, Governorate of Livonia, Russian Empire
- Died: 3 April 1958 (aged 66); Tartu, Estonia
- Resting place: Elva Cemetery
- Occupations: Writer, poet
- Years active: 1915–1946
- Spouses: Ida Kull; Hilda Luberg

Jaan Kärner (27 May 1891 – 3 April 1958) was an Estonian poet and writer. He is known especially for his nature poetry. Many of his poems were set to music by Estonian composers of choral music. Kärner also wrote numerous novels, plays, works of literary criticism, and scientific literature and historical treatises. He translated works from German and Russian, most notably the poems of Heinrich Heine into Estonian in 1934.

== Life and work ==
Jaan Kärner was born the son of a farmer, Kaarel Kärner and his wife Liis Kärner (née Terav). He had one brother, Johannes, and five sisters: Anna Marie, Emilie, Pauline, Ida and Alma and two half-brothers Aleksander and August. He attended Uderna school from 1901 to 1906 (Rõngu). From 1910 Kärner worked in various magazines in Tallinn. 1911/12 and 1914 he studied at the City People's University "AL Schanjawski" in Moscow. From 1917 Kärner was also politically active (first in the Estonian Socialist Revolutionary Party, later in the Estonian Independent Socialist Workers' Party) and in 1919 became editor of the trade union newspaper Töö hääl (Labor Voice). In 1919 he was elected to the Estonian Constituent Assembly.

Beginning in the early 1920s, Kärner worked as a freelance writer. From 1927 to 1929 he worked as an editor at the magazine Looming, and from 1936 to 1938 as an editor for the magazine Tänapäev. A left-winger, he supported the 1940 Communist seizure of power in Estonia. During the German occupation of Estonia during World War II Kärner lived in the Soviet Union. With the re-incorporation of Estonia into the Soviet Union in 1944, he returned to his homeland and worked in publishing as an editor at various newspapers and magazines. In 1946, Kärner descended into insanity and died in 1958 in Tartu.

He had one son, Ülo Kärner (born 1915–1941), through the marriage of his first wife Ida Kärner (née Kull) and two daughters, Eha (1919–1976) and Elo (1925–1991), with his second wife Hilda Anna Luise Kärner (née Luberg).

== Works (selection) ==
=== Poetry collections ===
- Aja laulud (1921)
- Lõikuskuu (1925)
- Õitsev sügis (1926)
- Inimene ristteel (1932)
- Sõna-sütega (1936)
- Käidud teedelt (1939)
- Kodumaa käsk (1942)
- Viha, ainult viha (1944)

=== Romantic verse ===
- Bianka ja Ruth (1923)

=== Fiction ===
- Naine vaesest maailmast (1930)
- Soodoma kroonika (1934)
- Tõusev rahvas (2 volumes, 1936/1937)
- Pidu kestab (1938)
