= The Wind Sculpted Land =

2018 film by Joosep Matjus

- Directed by: Joosep Matjus
- Produced by: Riho Västrik, Katri Rannastu, Atte Henriksson
- Production company: WildKino
- Release date: 2018
- Country: Estonia
- Language: Estonian

The Wind Sculpted Land (Estonian: Tuulte tahutud maa) is a 2018 Estonian documentary film directed by Joosep Matjus and narrated by actor Hannes Kaljujärv. The film is dedicated to the beauty of Estonian nature.

The film has won several awards, e.g. in 2018 Matsalu Nature Film Festival in the category Nature: Best Cinematography.
