= Arbi Sanit =

Indonesian political scientist (1939–2021)

Arbi Sanit (4 June 1939 – 25 March 2021) was an Indonesian political scientist and lecturer in the Faculty of Social and Political Sciences, University of Indonesia. He wrote several books on the Indonesian political system.

== Early life ==
Sanit was born in Painan, West Sumatra. He obtained his bachelor's degree in political sciences from the Faculty of Social and Political Sciences, University of Indonesia, in 1969. He also studied at the University of Wisconsin from 1973–1974.
