= Lake Arbi =

Lake in Estonia

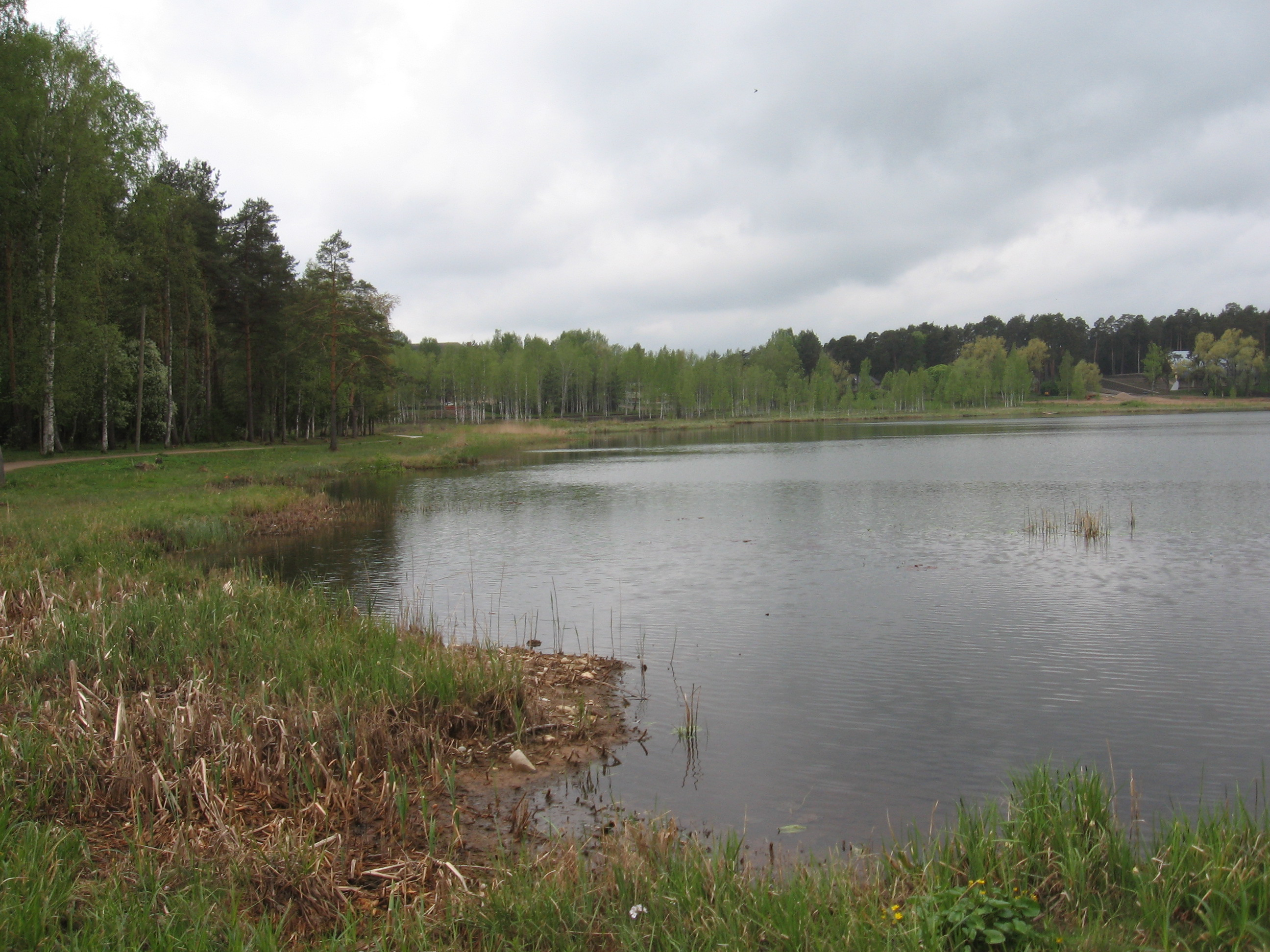

- Location within Estonia
- Location: Elva, Tartu County, Estonia
- Coordinates: 58°13′30″N 26°24′50″E
- Type: Eutrophic
- Primary outflows: Kraavioja (to Elva River)
- Basin countries: Estonia
- Max. length: 460 meters (1,510 ft)
- Max. width: 240 meters (790 ft)
- Surface area: 6.8 hectares (17 acres)
- Shore length^{1}: 1,360 meters (4,460 ft)
- Surface elevation: 42.8 m (140 ft)
- Settlements: Elva
- ^{1} Shore length is not a well-defined measure.

Lake Arbi (Estonian: Arbi järv; also known as Elva Väikejärv, Väike Elva järv) is a lake in the middle of the town of Elva in southern Estonia.

== Physical description ==
The lake has an area of 6.8 hectares (17 acres). It is 460 meters (1,510 ft) long, and its shoreline measures 1,360 meters (4,460 ft). The lake is 42.8 m (140 ft) above sea level.

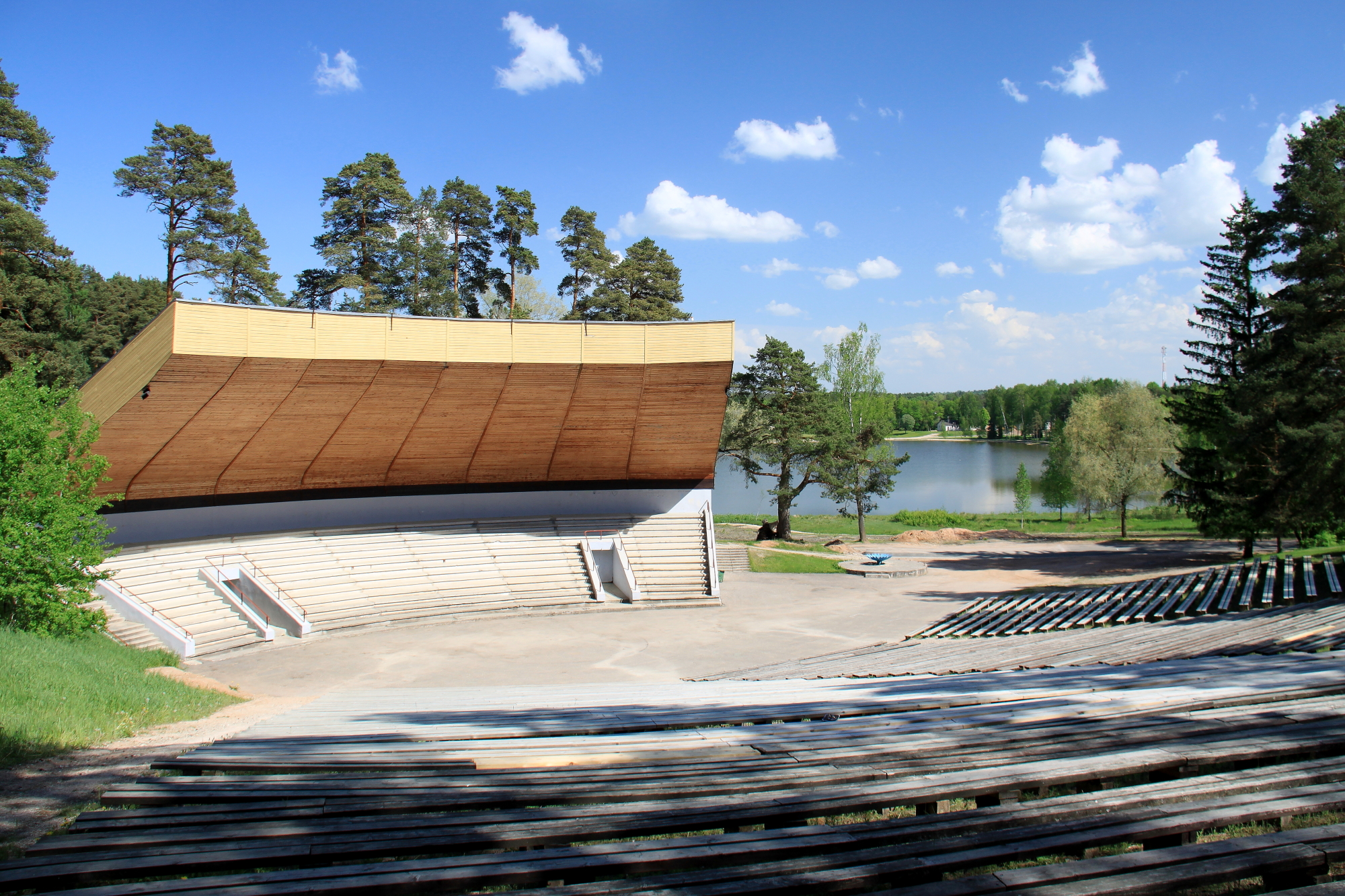
Elva bandshell with Lake Arbi in the background

== See also ==
- List of lakes of Estonia
- Lake Verevi, another lake in Elva
