= Elva, Estonia =

Town in Estonia

Elva
- Town
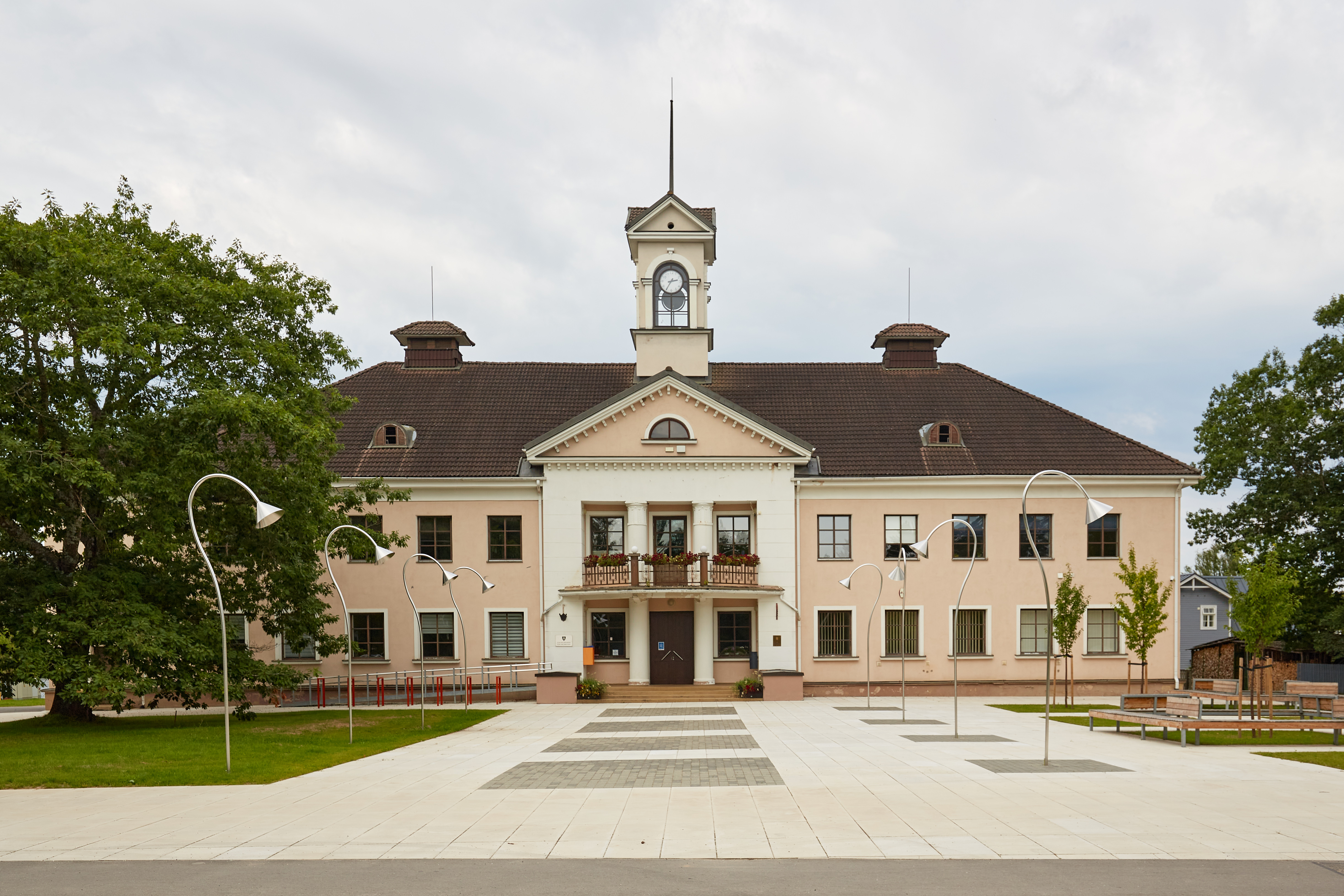
- Elva town hall

- Location in Estonia
- Coordinates: 58°13′28″N 26°25′16″E
- Country: Estonia
- County: Tartu County
- Municipality: Elva Parish
- Town rights: 1 May 1938

Area
  - Total: 9.92 km^{2} (3.83 sq mi)

Population (2026)
  - Total: 5,560
  - Rank: 18th
  - Density: 560/km^{2} (1,450/sq mi)

Ethnicity
  - Estonians: 95.3%
  - Russians: 2%
  - other: 2.7%
- Time zone: UTC+2 (EET)
  - Summer (DST): UTC+3 (EEST)

Elva is a town in Elva Parish, Tartu County, Estonia.

Elva has two large lakes: Lake Verevi, with a sandy and well-developed beach area that is very popular in the summer, and Lake Arbi, with wet reed grown shores.

Elva's largest employer (and in all of southern Estonia) is GPV Estonia AS, subsidiary of GPV Group, providing electronics manufacturing services in industrial electronics. Elva has one school, Elva Gümnaasium, offering education from 1st grade to high school graduation.

A dominant element in Elva is the train station which today is a visitors' information center, and which used to be an important trade route in the past centuries.

Detailed information on hikes on foot or by bicycle can be obtained from the visitors' information center. The Elva River, with old water mill sites and rapid banks, is popular for canoeing. In winter skiers can participate in the Tartu Marathon, belonging to the Worldloppet series. Its 60 km track from Otepää to Elva can be cycled through on mountain bikes in summer.

== History of Elva ==
Elva was founded soon after the completion of Tartu-Valga train route, which was built from 1886 to 1889. Elva was first mentioned in an Estonian newspaper in 1889.

Elva is named after the Elva River, which was mentioned in books already in the 17th century.

In 1913 a two-grade school was opened.

On 1 May 1938 Elva became a town.

The town center was heavily damaged in the Second World War. In July 1941 Elva was liberated by the Forest Brothers. In August 1944 surroundings of Elva became a bloody battlefield between Hyazinth von Strachwitz's Panzer brigade and the Red Army.

From 1950 to 1962 Elva was District Central of Elva district. Elva's town rights were restored in 1965.

Elva had a company called Elvex, founded 1989 and called also as Elva autoklaasitehas. The factory specialized on production of car windshields, as spare parts windshields were not available in Soviet Union. In 1996 Saint-Gobain acquired all Elvex shares and created Saint-Gobain Estonia branch.

== Neighborhoods of Elva ==
There are seven neighborhoods of Elva:

- Arbimäe
- Järve
- Kesklinn
- Kulbilohu
- Mahlamäe
- Moonuse
- Peedu

== Notable people ==
- Ivan Kondakov (1857–1931), Russian chemist and professor of pharmacology; lived in Elva 1911–1918 and 1921–1931
- Leopold Hansen (1879–1964), actor and theatre director; lived in Elva
- Hugo Raudsepp (1883–1952), playwright; lived in Elva
- Jaan Kärner (1891–1958), poet and writer; lived in Elva 1921–1936
- Johannes Silvet (1895–1979), lexicographer, died in Elva
- Richard Janno (1900–1942), writer, journalist and teacher; lived in Elva 1936–1942
- Magda Staudinger (1902-1997), biologist and botanist; was born in Elva
- Peeter Sink (1902–1957), painter and poet; lived in Elva in the 1950s
- Eduard Kutsar (1902–1970), painter; lived in Elva 1944–1970
- Valter Heuer (1928–2006), chess player and chess historian; was born in Elva
- Jüri Rätsep (1935–2018), lawyer, politician and judge, graduated in Elva
- Heldur Jõgioja (1936 – 2010), musician, composer, writer, and journalist; born in Elva
- Tiiu Märss (née Noppel) (born 1943), geologist and paleontologist, born in Elva
- Toomas Järveoja (born 1961), politician, the mayor of Elva, 2011-2015
- Erik Ruus (born 1962–2025), actor, worked at the Endla Theatre
- Urmas Kruuse (born 1965), politician; was born and lived in Elva, was the Mayor of Elva 2002–2007
- Arti Hilpus (born 1972), born in Elva, diplomat, Ambassador to Russia, 2015 to 2018.
- Jim Ollinovski (:et) (1974–1993), poet, writer and artist; was born and lived in Elva
- Joosep Matjus (born 1984), film director, cinematographer, scenarist and documentary filmmaker.
- Kerli (born 1987), singer, full name Kerli Kõiv; was born and grew up in Elva
- Luisa Rõivas (born 1987), (née Luisa Värk), singer; was born and grew up in Elva

=== Sport ===
- Tarmo Kikerpill (born 1977), basketball player; was born in Elva
- Caspar Austa (born 1982), cyclist, born in Elva
- Jürgen Kuresoo (born 1987), footballer, played 369 games and 2 for Estonia
- Martin Järveoja (born 1987), rally co-driver, born in Elva 2019 WRC World Champion
- Kauri Kõiv (born 1983), biathlete and competitor in the 2010 Winter Olympic Games
- Kalle Kriit (born 1983), cyclist, nickname is Estonian Emperor.
- Grete Gaim (born 1993), biathlete, competed at the 2014 Winter Olympics

== Twin towns – sister cities ==
The former municipality of Elva (until 2017) was twinned with:

- Kempele, Finland
- Kristinehamn, Sweden
- Salo, Finland
- (Georgia (country)) Zestaponi, Georgia

== Sport ==
=== Football ===
- FC Elva

== Gallery ==
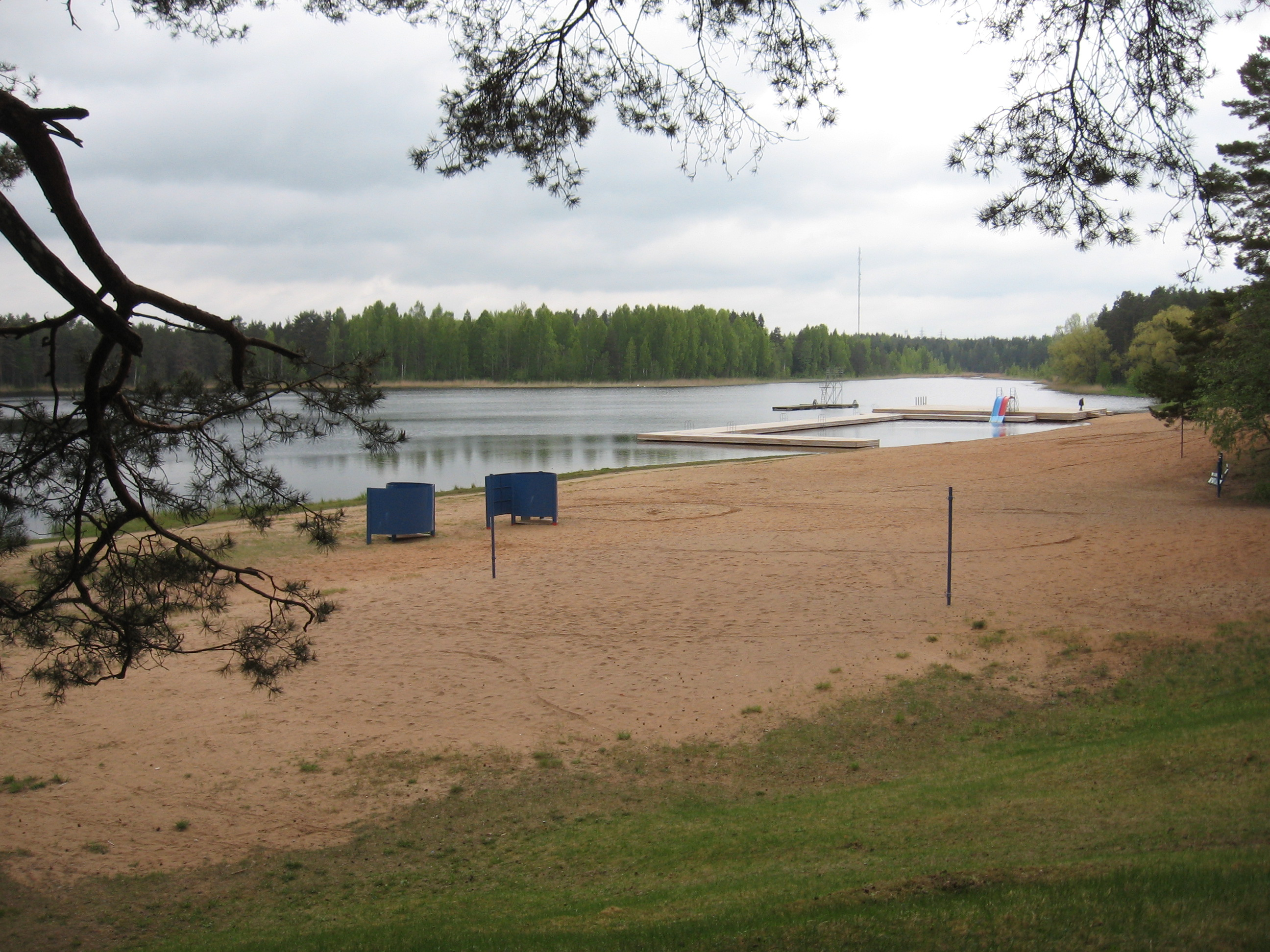
The beach of Lake Verevi in Elva.

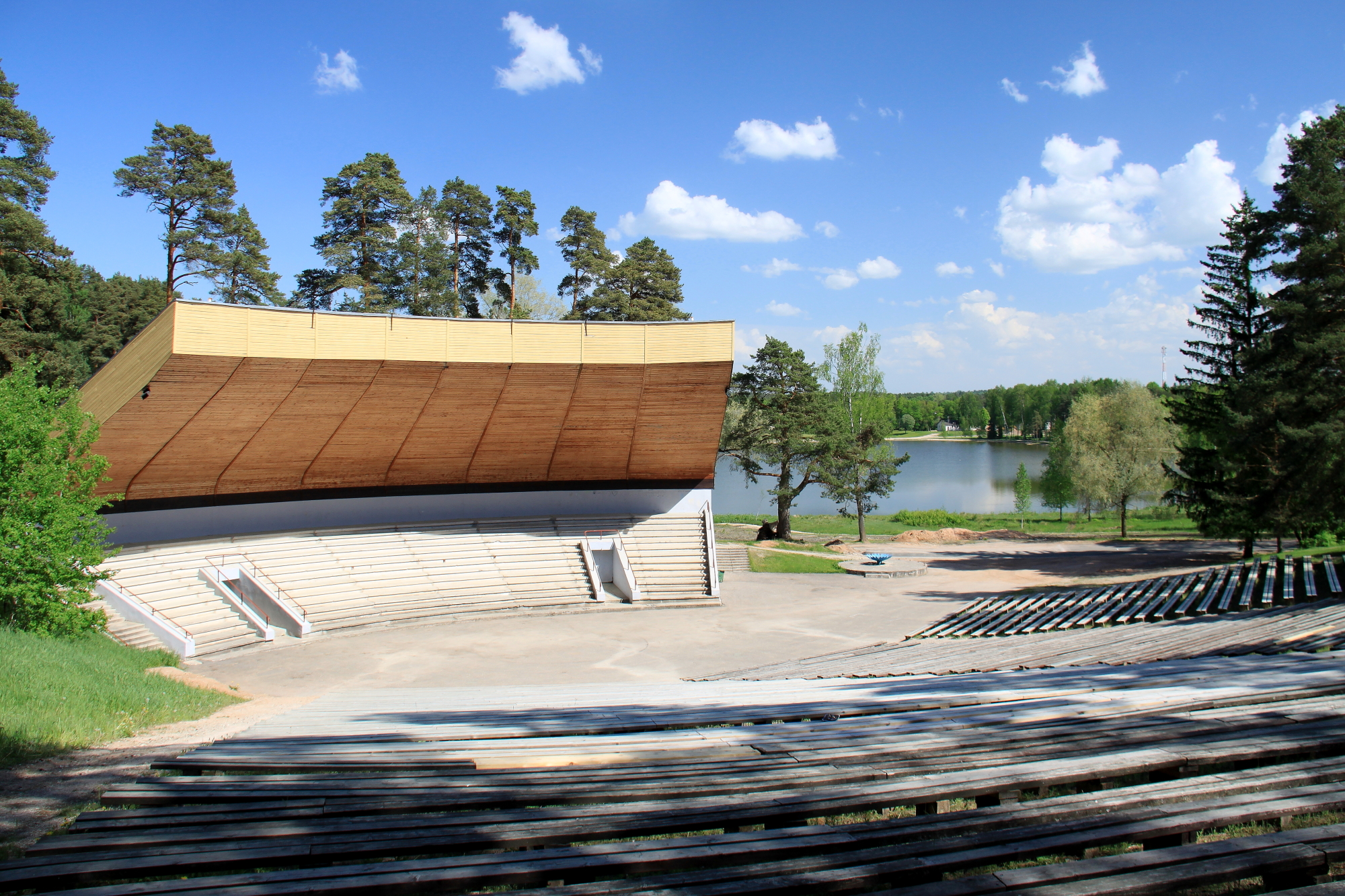
Elva song festival ground, Lake Arbi in the background.

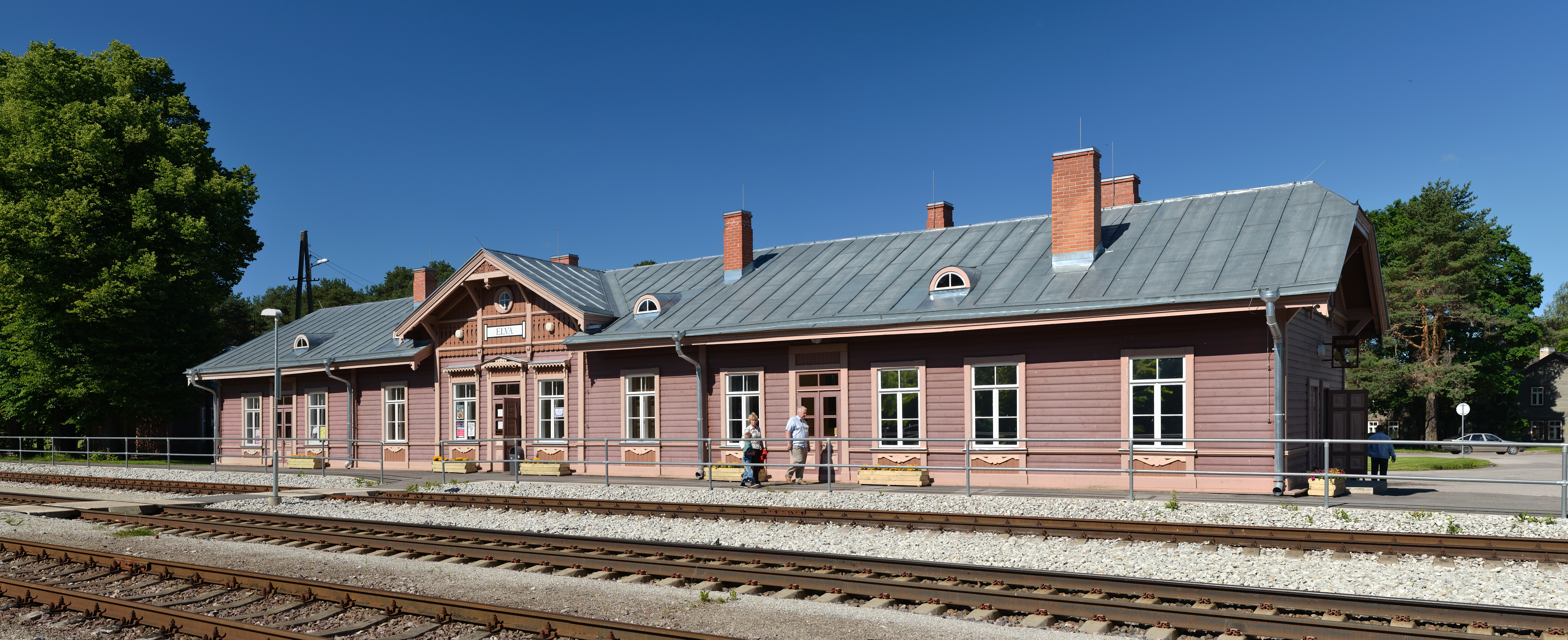
Elva train station

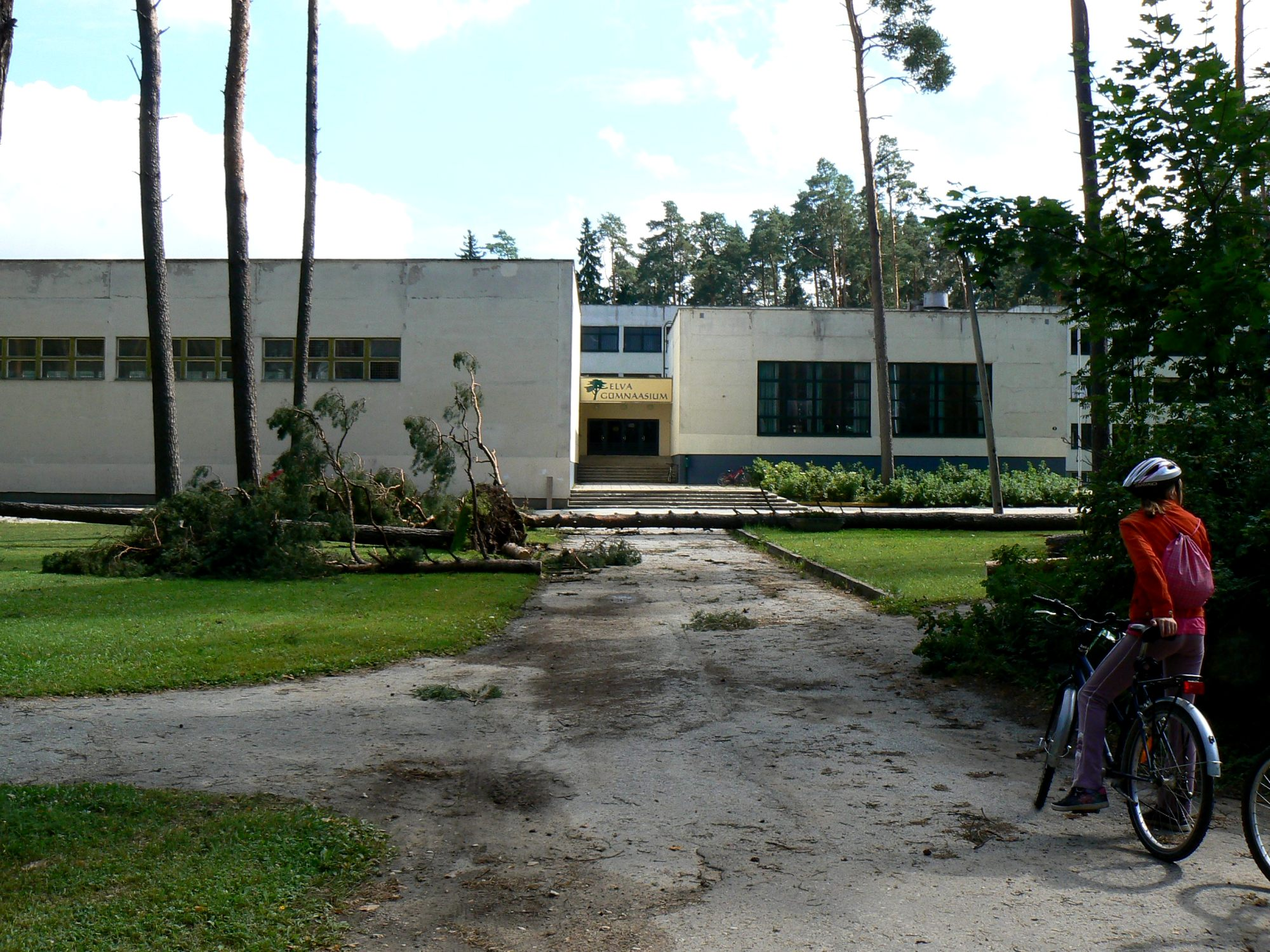
Elva Gymnasium after a thunderstorm in 2010.

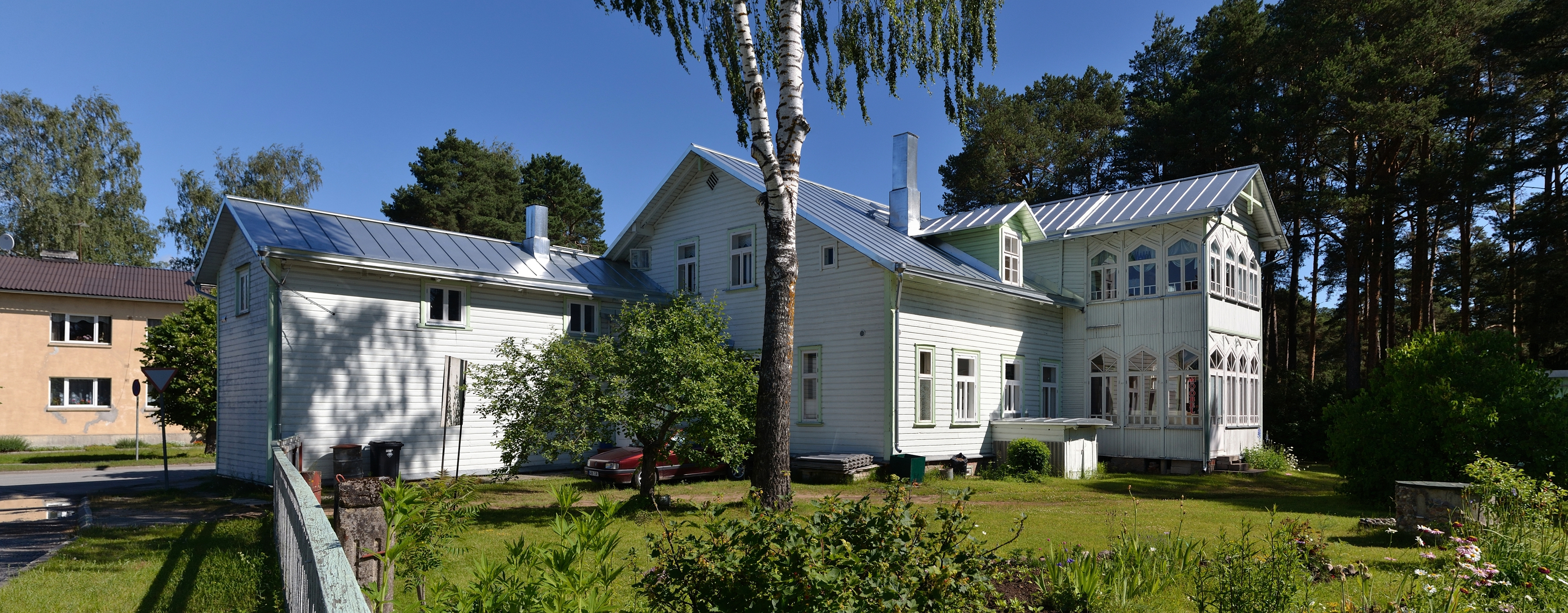
Pharmacy-house

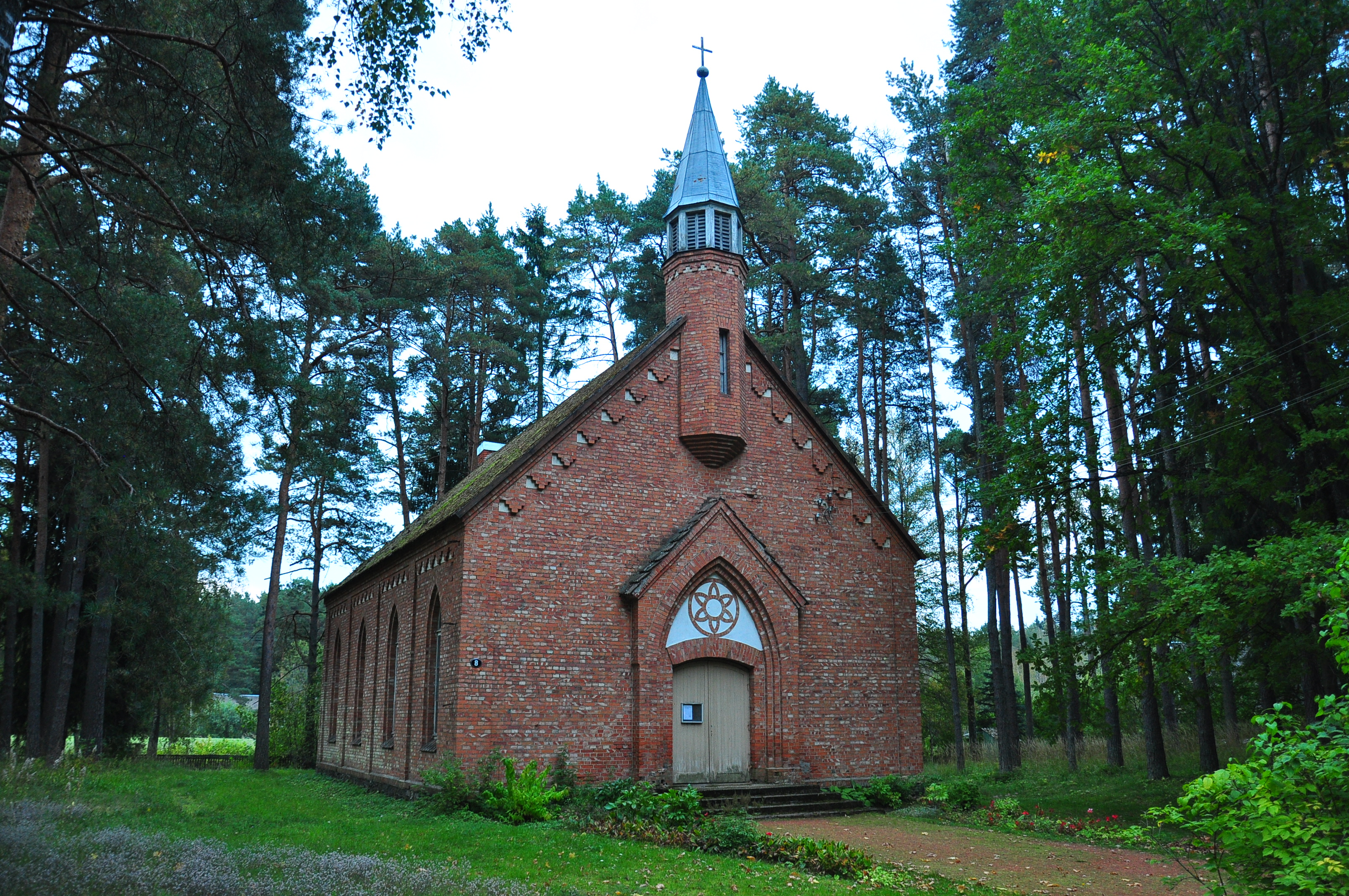
Elva Church

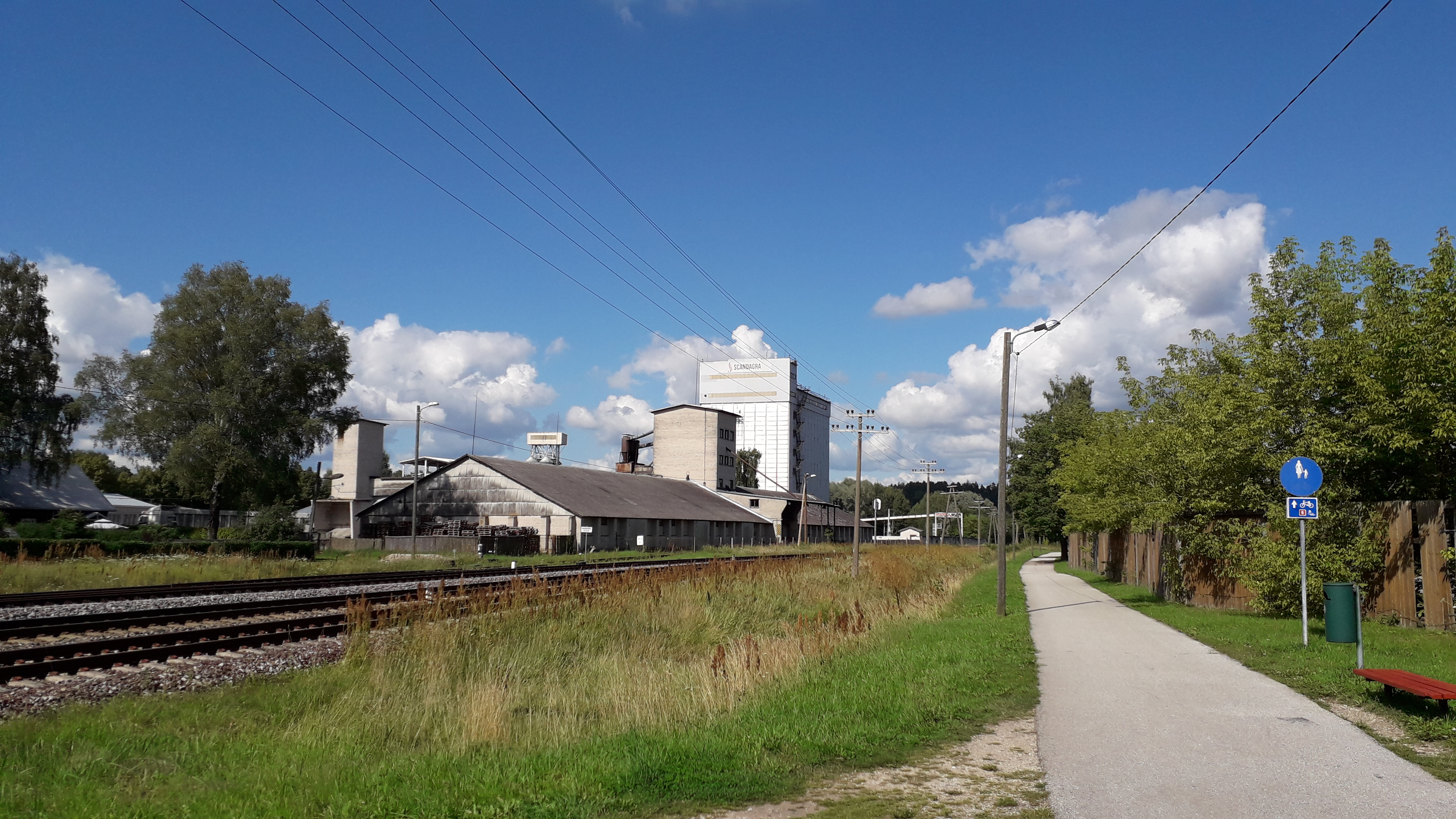
railway area in Elva

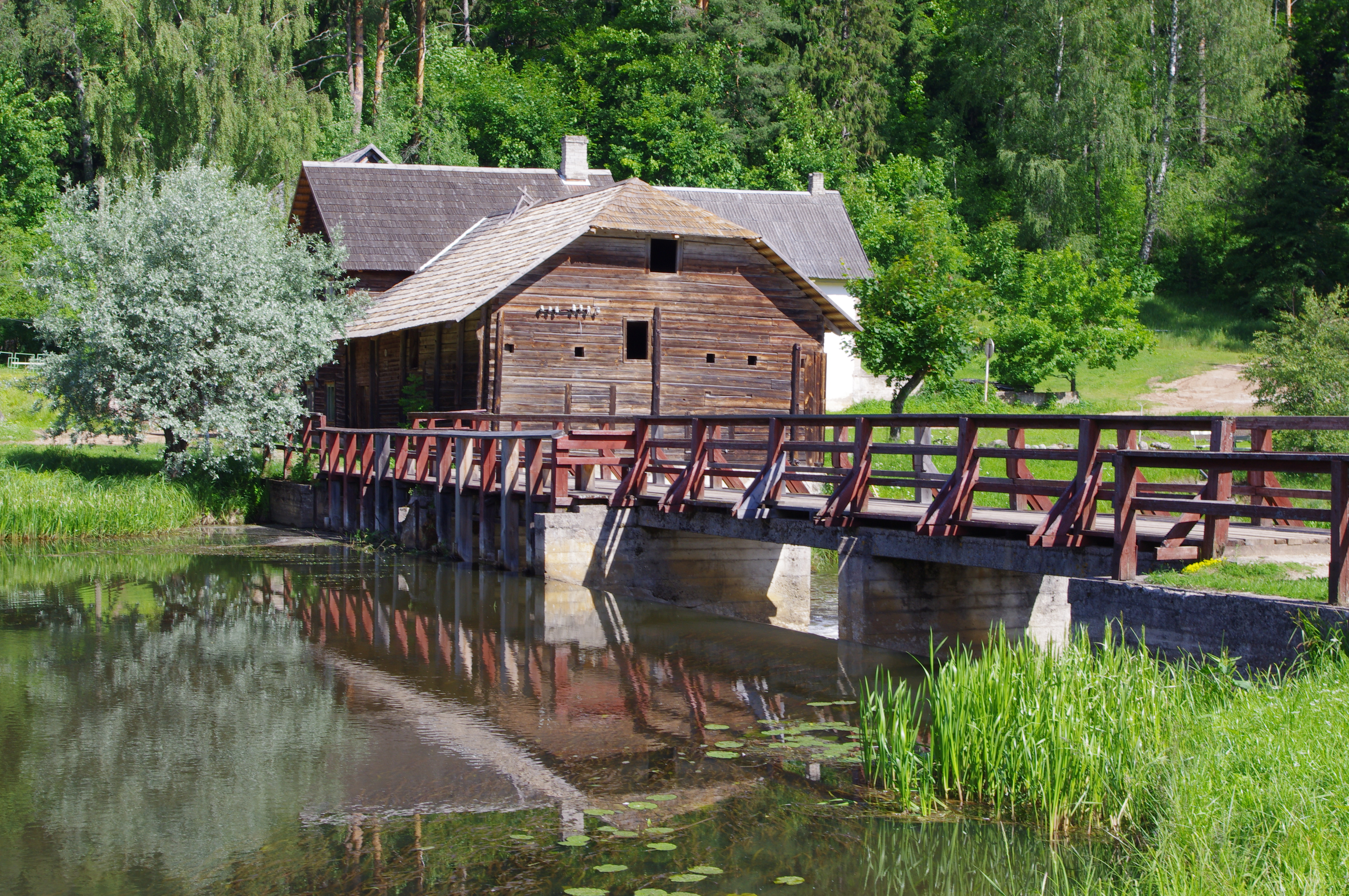
Peedu-Nuti watermill

== See also ==
- FC Elva
