= List of Estonian entomologists =

Below is a list of Estonian entomologists.

- Alfonso Dampf Tenson (3 December 1884 Hiiumaa – 17 March 1948 Mexico City) worked on multiple groups including Tipulidae, Siphonaptera and Simulidae. It is estimated he collected over a million insect specimens during his career.
- Hans Kauri (until 1935, Hans Mühlberg; May 30, 1906 – January 30, 1999), among other things, studied horse-flies, daddy longlegs (Opiliones), and spiders. He wrote several publications. In 1985 he worked on material from central Africa, which resulted in 61 new species, 12 new genera, and three new sub-families for science. As late as 1998 he produced an overview of spiders on the Hardanger Plateau, edited by Erling Hauge and Torstein Solhøy.
- Tõnu Kesküla (fl. 1997), a lepidopterist, described the taxon Parnassius mnemosyne viidaleppi Kesküla & Luig, 1997.
- Olavi Kurina (born 10 September 1966) described the taxon Neuratelia jabalmoussae Kurina, Õunap & Põldmaa, 2015.

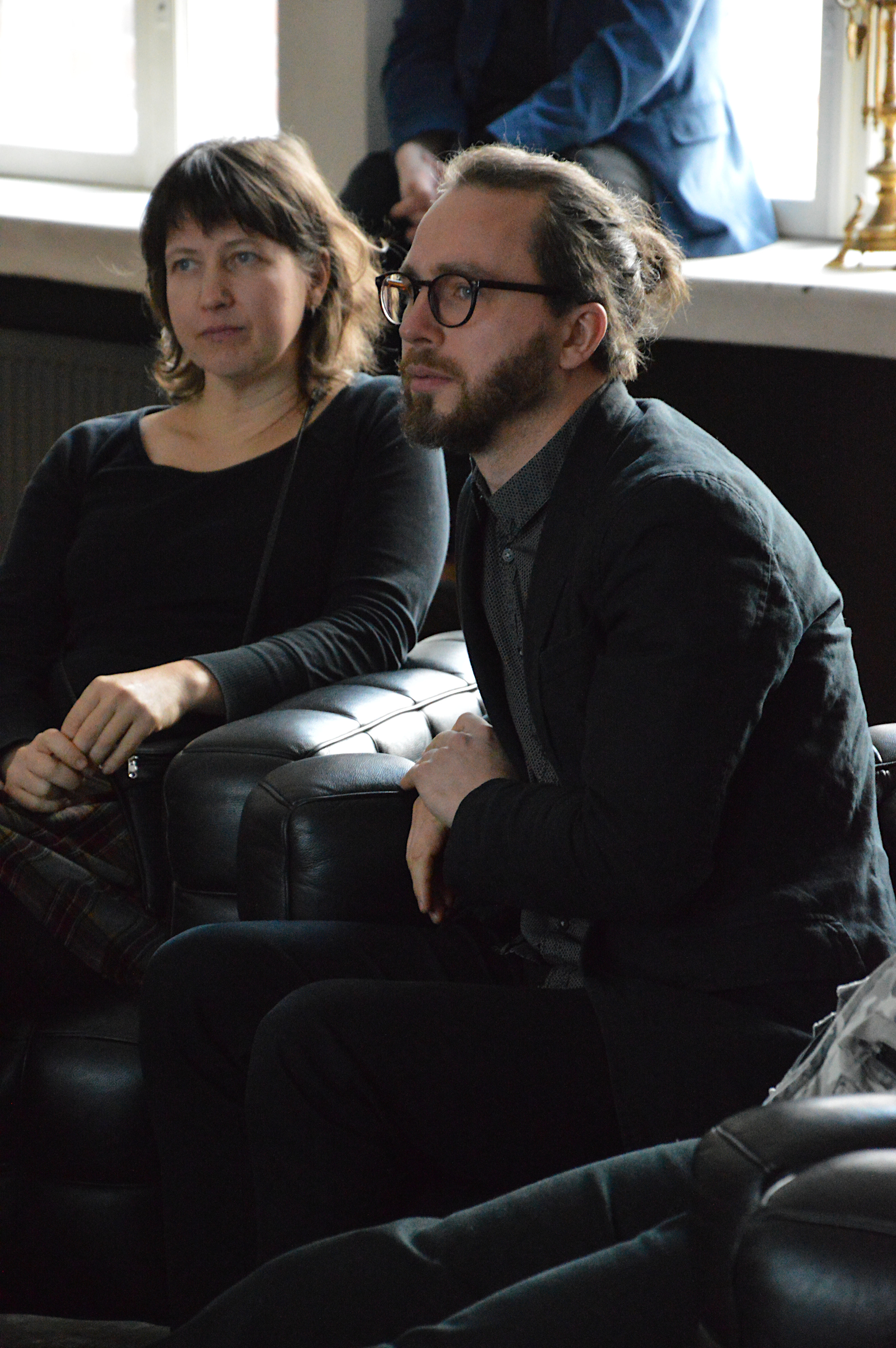
Lennart Lennuk

- Lennart Lennuk (born 27 October 1985) described the taxon Dioscore kirke Lindt, Lennuk & Viidalepp, 2017
- Aare Lindt (fl. 2014) described the taxa Haruchlora Viidalepp & Lindt, 2014 (Haruchlora maesi) and Vallichlora Viidalepp & Lindt, 2019 (Vallichlora rara, Vallichlora selva).
- Jaan Luig (born 23 June 1959), a lepidopterist, described the taxon Parnassius mnemosyne viidaleppi Kesküla & Luig, 1997.
- Erki Õunap (born 5 July 1977) described the taxon Neuratelia jabalmoussae Kurina, Õunap & Põldmaa, 2015.
- Aleksander Pototski (born on 8 October 1958), a lepidopterist, described the taxon Archedontia Hausmann, Pototski & Viidalepp, 2020 (and the species Archedontia agnesae Hausmann, Pototski & Viidalepp, 2020).
- Villu Soon (born 20 February 1979) described the taxon Chrysis borealis Paukkunen, Ødegaard & Soon, 2015.
- Toomas Tammaru (born 3 May 1968 in Tartu), a lepidopterist and professor of entomology at the University of Tartu, as well as the editor of the Estonian Naturalists' Society publication Lepinfo, worked with Andro Truuverk and Erki Õunap to transfer the butterfly Epirrita pulchraria to the genus Malacodea; the butterfly (Manota toomasi Hippa & Kurina, 2012) is named after him.
- Urmas Tartes (born September 19, 1963), an Estonian biologist and nature photographer, was the recipient of the Fourth Class of Order of the White Star in 2001 and in 2009 won Veolia Environnement Wildlife Photographer of the Year in the category "Animals in their Environment" with a photo of a springtail on a snowflake.
- Tõnis Tasane (born 13 December 1986 in Pärnu), a lepidopterist, described the taxon Lissochlora janamariae Lindt & Tasane, 2014 .
- Andro Truuverk (born on 23 January 1986), a lepidopterist, described the taxon Lasianobia dvoraki Saldaitis, Volynkin & Truuverk, 2018.
- Jaan Viidalepp (born 27 December 1939) described the taxon Haruchlora Viidalepp & Lindt, 2014, Pasiphila hyrcanica Viidalepp & Mironov, 2006, and Vallichlora Viidalepp & Lindt 2019.
