= Diphya wesolowskae =

Scientific classification
- Kingdom: Animalia
- Phylum: Arthropoda
- Subphylum: Chelicerata
- Class: Arachnida
- Order: Araneae
- Infraorder: Araneomorphae
- Family: Tetragnathidae
- Genus: Diphya
- Species: D. wesolowskae

Binomial name
- Diphya wesolowskae Omelko, Marusik & Lyle, 2020

Species of spider

Diphya wesolowskae is a species of long-jawed orb weaver in the genus Diphya that lives in South Africa. First described in 2020 by Mikhail Omelko, Yuri Marusik and Robin Lyle, the spider is small, with a typical length between 2.8 and 3.17 mm (0.110 and 0.125 in). The female is larger than the male. It has a brown to dark brown and patternless carapace, which distinguishes the species from the more common Diphya simoni. The male has an abdomen that is also brown to dark brown and has a pattern of two dark spots, although some examples have more complex, but indistinct, patterns of spots and stripes. The female has a light brown abdomen marked with large spots and stripes. The copulatory organs are distinctive to the species. The female has a epigyne, the external visible part of its copulatory organs, that lacks pockets but has a thicker septal stem than Diphya foordi, and the male has a very long, thin projection that extends from the palpal bulb beyond the cymbium and a very short embolus.

== Taxonomy ==
Diphya wesolowskae is a species of long-jawed orb weaver that was first described by the arachnologists Mikhail Omelko, Yuri Marusik and Robin Lyle in 2020. They named the species after the Polish arachnologist Wanda Wesołowska on her 70th birthday. It was allocated to the genus Diphya, which was first circumscribed by Hercule Nicolet in 1849. The genus is a member of the subfamily Diphyainae in the family Tetragnathidae. The family is monophyletic, although there is instability in the placement of the different genera and species. By combining molecular analysis with morphological study, Fernando Alvarez-Padilla and Gustavo Hormiga concluded that the genus is sister to Chrysometa within a clade. They also suggest that the genus is monophyletic. The holotype is stored in the National Collection of Arachnida at the Plant Protection Research Institute in Pretoria.

== Description ==
The spider is small, with a dark brown to brown body consists of two main sections, a carapace and, behind that, a smaller abdomen. The male has a typical total length of 2.8 mm (0.11 in), its carapace having a typical length of 1.61 mm (0.063 in) and width of 1.19 mm (0.047 in). It has a faint yellow to brown stripe across the middle, thin yellow lines gracing the back end. Its eye field is black and the part of its face known as its clypeus is yellow. Its chelicerae and the rest of its mouthparts are dark brown with three teeth forward and four to the back. The part of the underside called its sternum is brown with a blackish stripe down the middle from the front to the back and blackish edges.

The male spider's abdomen has two dark spots visible on most examples, although a few specimens have a pattern of spots and lines which are barely visible as their abdomen is generally lighter. It is raised and of a more bulbous shape than the carapace. The side of the abdomen is more grey and has thin yellow stripes. The greyish underside has yellow spots. The spider's legs are generally brown and dark yellow, although some also have grey areas and some are yellow. Its copulatory organs is distinctive with a long palpal tibia, four times longer than it is wide, that ends with a cymbium that has a long spike attached to its base that points off to the side. Attached to this is a palpal bulb that has a very short embolus with a similarly short embolic loop. The bulb has a very long, thin projection that extends beyond the cymbium, which is also pronounced.

The female is slightly larger, typically 3.17 mm (0.125 in). Its carapace is dark brown with a yellow-brown broad stripe across the middle. It is similar in length to the male but narrower, typically 1.17 mm (0.046 in) across. It has a dark brown rather than black eye field and, although tts clypeus is also dark brown, its chelicerae are a lighter brown than the male. Its abdomen is light brown and has a pattern of large black spots and stripes, the sides being similar to the male and the underside a patternless grey. Its legs are dark brown and brown, and lack the yellow sections visible on the male. Its epigyne, the external visible part of its copulatory organs, has a plate that is longer than it is wide and a receptacle shaped like an elongated oval. It has no pockets.

The species can be distinguished from the more widely distributed Diphya simoni by its pattern-less carapace. The shape of the copulatory organs help identify it from other members of the genus. Particularly, the length of the protrusions from the male palpal bulb clearly mark out the species against other examples found in South Africa. Other features enable the spider to be compared to members of the genus from other countries. For example, like other African members of the genus, the species lack the tibial apophysis and copulatory ducts found in American examples. The epigyne is most similar to Diphya foordi, differing in having a thicker septal stem.

== Distribution and habitat ==
Diphya wesolowskae is endemic to South Africa. The holotype was found near Cathedral Peak in KwaZulu-Natal in 2005. The spider was also observed in other locations across the province and into Limpopo. Examples have been found in the Entabeni and ithala Game Reserves, and Lekgalameetse Provincial Park. It is the second most common of its genus in South Africa after Diphya simoni, although restricted to the eastern side of the country.

Diphya spiders, like other tetragnathids that build webs, prefers to live in areas that are rich with water. Diphya wesolowskae thrives in a range of environments, including grassland, plantations and forests. The species was collected among grass in the Grassland and Forest Biomes.
