= Diphya =

Scientific classification
- Kingdom: Animalia
- Phylum: Arthropoda
- Subphylum: Chelicerata
- Class: Arachnida
- Order: Araneae
- Infraorder: Araneomorphae
- Family: Tetragnathidae
- Genus: Diphya; Nicolet, 1849

Type species
- D. macrophthalma Nicolet, 1849

Species
- 21, see text

Genus of spiders

Diphya is a genus of long-jawed orb-weavers first described by H. Nicolet in 1849.

== Distribution ==
Species in this genus have been found in Asia, Africa, and South America.

== Description ==
Diphya species have a pear-shaped, shiny, yellowish brown to brown carapace with the eye area usually darker. The eyes are prominent and large, with their distinctive shape distinguishing the genus from other Tetragnathidae genera. The lateral eyes are widely spaced in two rows with the posterior row being the widest, and the eye region is elevated.

The clypeus is steep and vertical, and the sternum is heart-shaped. The abdomen is stout and rounded, pale to dark with a pattern. The legs are long and slender with the front legs longer than the rest.

Diphya species can be easily recognized by an anterior row of stiff inflexible setae on the tibia and metatarsi I and II. The male palp has a spine-like cymbial outgrowth.

== Life style ==
Most specimens have been collected during surveys using various methods including sweeping, beating, pitfall traps, litter sifting and vacuum sampling. They have been recorded from Forest, Grassland, Savanna, Fynbos and Indian Coastal Belt biomes.

Marusik speculated in 2017 that they most likely do not build webs but catch their prey with a "basket" formed by the spiny first pair of legs, but photographs are now available of D. simoni in a small orb-web made in dead wood.

== Taxonomy ==
Diphya belongs to its own tribe, Diphyaini, of the family Tetragnathidae. Known South African species were revised by Omelko, Marusik and Lyle in 2020.

D. tanasevitchi and D. albulum were transferred from Lophomma in 2007.

== Species ==
As of October 2025, this genus includes 21 species:

- Diphya albula (Paik, 1983) – Korea
- Diphya bicolor Vellard, 1926 – Brazil
- Diphya foordi Omelko, Marusik & Lyle, 2020 – South Africa
- Diphya guiyang J. S. Zhang & Yu, 2022 – China
- Diphya leroyorum Omelko, Marusik & Lyle, 2020 – South Africa
- Diphya limbata Simon, 1896 – Chile, Argentina
- Diphya macrophthalma Nicolet, 1849 – Chile (type species)
- Diphya napo Ott, Rodrigues & Brescovit, 2023 – Ecuador
- Diphya okumae Tanikawa, 1995 – China, Korea, Japan
- Diphya pumila Simon, 1889 – Madagascar
- Diphya qianica Zhu, Song & Zhang, 2003 – China
- Diphya rugosa Tullgren, 1902 – Chile
- Diphya simoni Kauri, 1950 – South Africa
- Diphya songi Wu & Yang, 2010 – China
- Diphya spinifera Tullgren, 1902 – Chile
- Diphya taiwanica Tanikawa, 1995 – Taiwan
- Diphya tanasevitchi (F. Zhang, Y. X. Zhang & Yu, 2003) – China
- Diphya vanderwaltae Omelko, Marusik & Lyle, 2020 – South Africa
- Diphya weimiani J. S. Zhang & Yu, 2022 – China
- Diphya wesolowskae Omelko, Marusik & Lyle, 2020 – South Africa
- Diphya wulingensis Yu, Zhang & Omelko, 2014 – China, Russia (Far East)

In synonymy:

- D. bilineata Tullgren, 1901 = Diphya limbata Simon, 1896
- D. brevipes Nicolet, 1849 = Diphya macrophthalma Nicolet, 1849
- D. crassipes Nicolet, 1849 = Diphya macrophthalma Nicolet, 1849
- D. longipes Nicolet, 1849 = Diphya macrophthalma Nicolet, 1849
- D. pallida Tullgren, 1902 = Diphya limbata Simon, 1896
- D. tanikawai Marusik, 2017 = Diphya simoni Kauri, 1950

== See also ==
- Lophomma
