= Epirrita undulata =

Scientific classification
- Domain: Eukaryota
- Kingdom: Animalia
- Phylum: Arthropoda
- Class: Insecta
- Order: Lepidoptera
- Family: Geometridae
- Tribe: Operophterini
- Genus: Epirrita
- Species: E. undulata

Binomial name
- Epirrita undulata (Harrison, 1942)

Species of moth

Epirrita undulata is a species of geometrid moth in the family Geometridae.

The MONA or Hodges number for Epirrita undulata is 7434.
