= Toomas Tammaru =

Estonian zooloogist (lepidopterist)

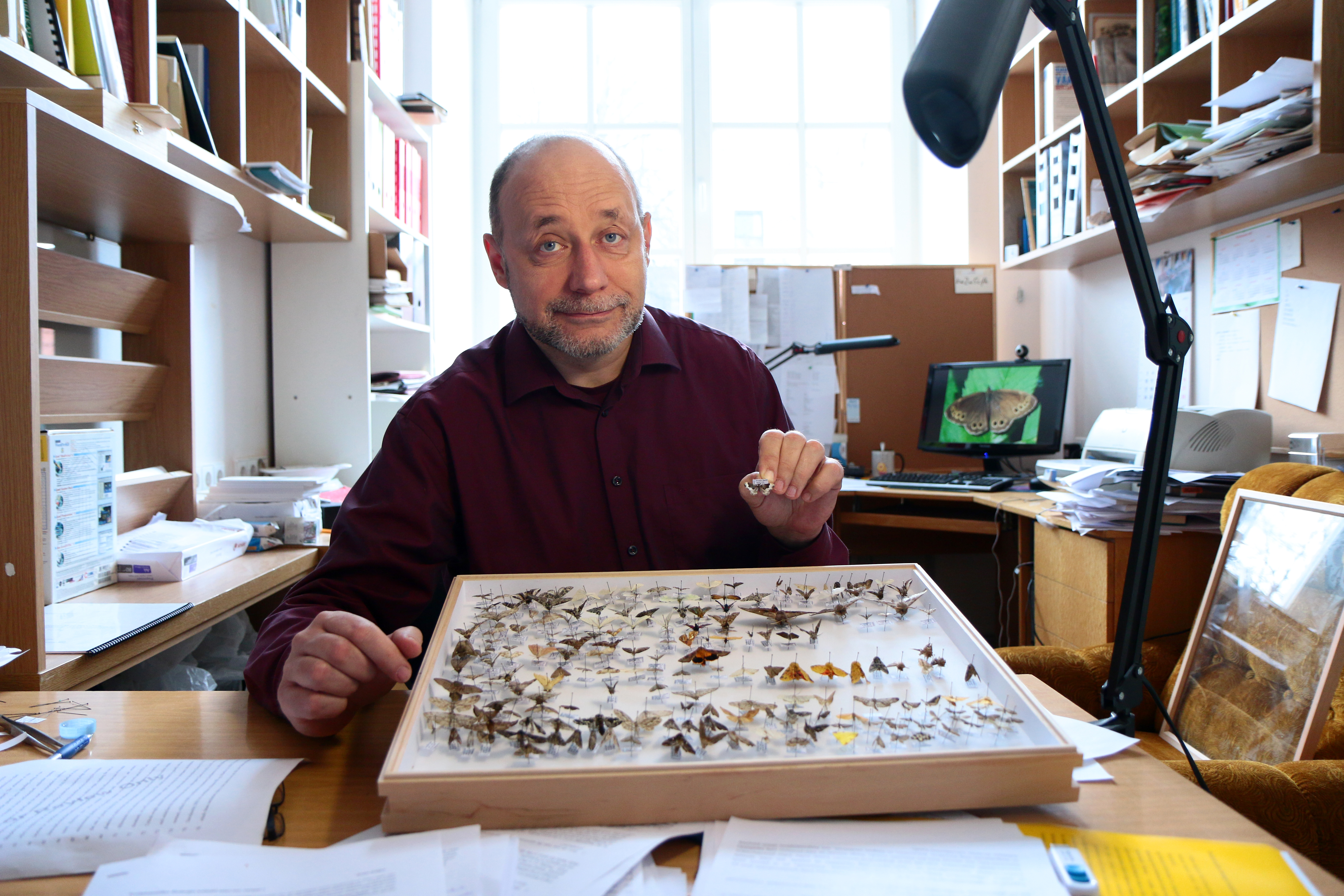
Toomas Tammaru

Toomas Tammaru (born 3 May 1968 in Tartu), is an Estonian lepidopterist and professor of entomology at the University of Tartu.

Together with Andro Truuverk and Erki Õunap, he transferred the butterfly Epirrita pulchraria to the genus Malacodea.

The butterfly (Manota toomasi Hippa & Kurina, 2012) is named after him.

He is the editor of the publication Lepinfo of the Estonian Naturalists' Society.
