= Johann Hornung =

Baltic German clergyman and language enthusiast

Johann Hornung (c. 1660 Tallinn – 1715) was a Baltic-German Lutheran clergyman and language enthusiast.

He worked as a sacristan in several Estonian churches, including Põltsamaa (1692–1698) and Karula (1698–1715).

With Adrian Virginius, he translated New Testament into North Estonian. 1694 he published the religious book Önsa Luterusse Laste Öppetuse ..., and he was a coauthor of the religious book Ma Kele Koddo ning Kirgo Ramatu.

His most important work was the Latin-language Grammatica Esthonica ..., which provided an overview of the grammar of North Estonian.
