= Tammaru (surname) =

Tammaru is an Estonian surname. Notable people with the surname include:

- Karin Tammaru (born 1971), Estonian actress
- Toomas Tammaru (born 1968), Estonian lepidopterist and professor of entomology
