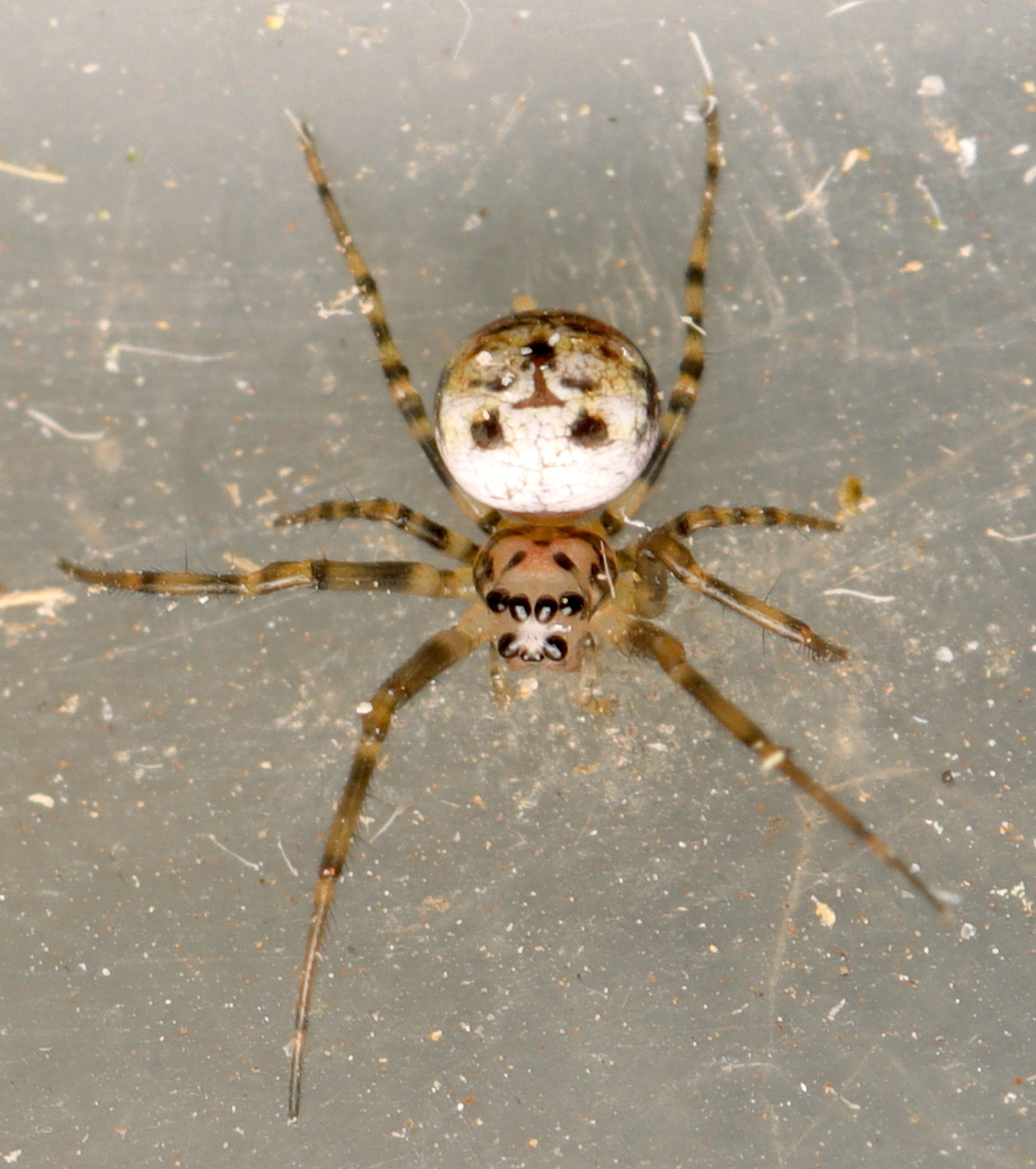

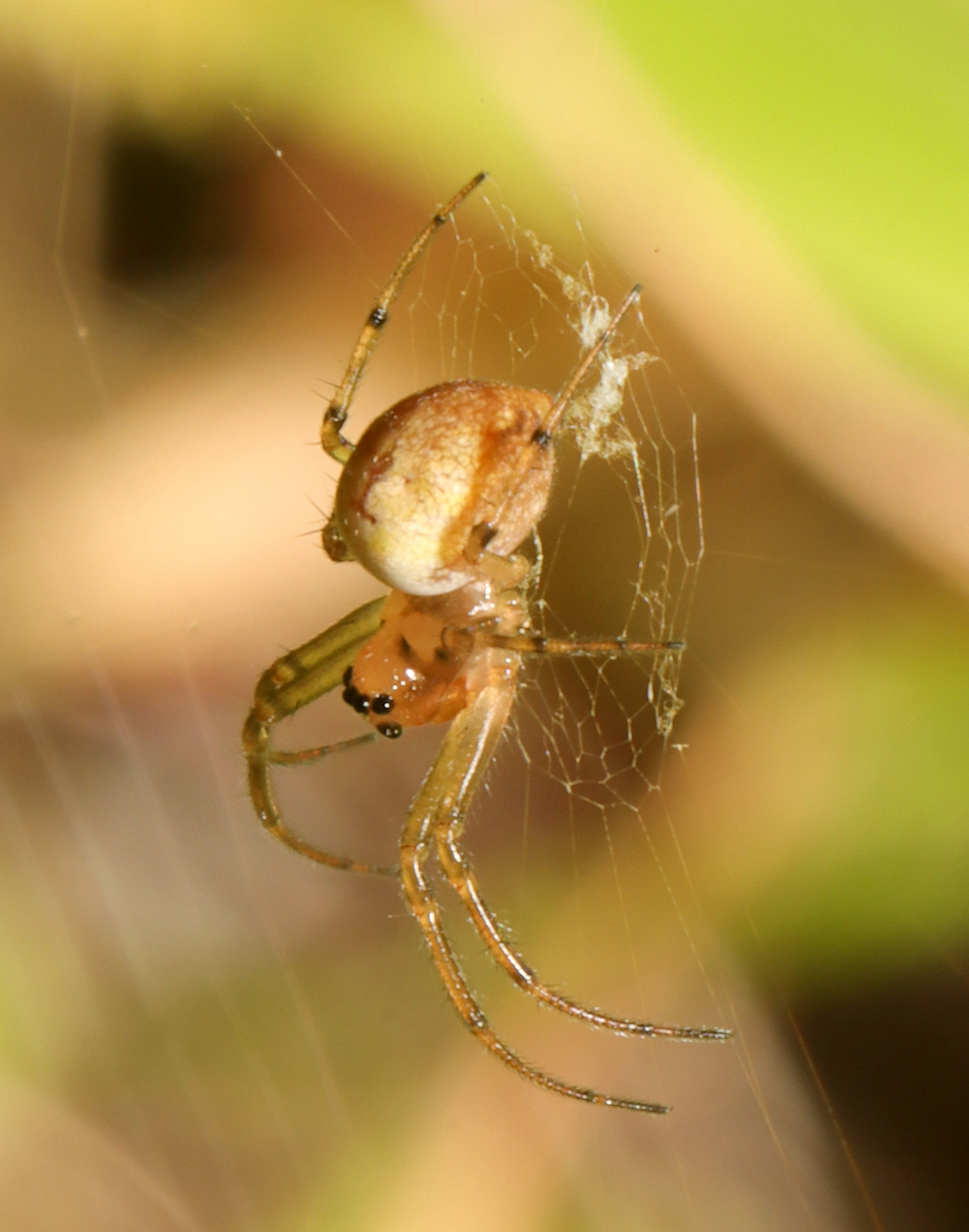

Scientific classification
- Kingdom: Animalia
- Phylum: Arthropoda
- Subphylum: Chelicerata
- Class: Arachnida
- Order: Araneae
- Infraorder: Araneomorphae
- Family: Tetragnathidae
- Genus: Diphya
- Species: D. simoni

Binomial name
- Diphya simoni Kauri, 1950

Synonyms
- Diphya capensis Simon, 1894; Diphya tanikawai Marusik, 2017

= Diphya simoni =

Simon's Diphya Web Spider

Species of spider

Diphya simoni is a species of spider in the family Tetragnathidae. It is endemic to South Africa and is commonly known as Simon's Diphya web spider.

== Distribution ==
Diphya simoni is found across five South African provinces: Eastern Cape, KwaZulu-Natal, Mpumalanga, North West, and Western Cape. The species has been recorded from numerous locations including Kruger National Park, Table Mountain National Park, and various sites along the Eastern Cape coast.

== Habitat and ecology ==
The species inhabits Grassland and Savanna biomes at altitudes ranging from 418 to 2,826 m. Specimens have been collected low in grasses using sweep nets.

A photograph documented D. simoni constructing a small vertical orb-web in dead wood at Klapmuts in the Western Cape.

== Description ==
The abdomen is stout and rounded, pale to dark with a pattern. The legs are long and slender with the front legs longer than the others.

The species can be recognized by an anterior row of stiff inflexible setae on the tibia and metatarsi I and II. The male palp features a spine-like cymbial outgrowth.

== Conservation ==
Diphya simoni is listed as Least Concern by the South African National Biodiversity Institute. Although presently known only from females, the species has a wide geographical range. It is protected in Kruger National Park and Table Mountain National Park.

== Taxonomy ==
The species was originally described by Hans Kauri in 1950 from Kruger National Park. It was redescribed by Marusik in 2017 and by Omelko, Marusik and Lyle in 2020, who synonymized Diphya tanikawai with D. simoni.
