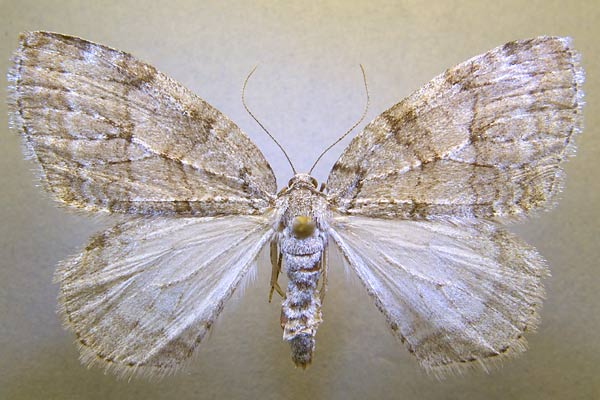

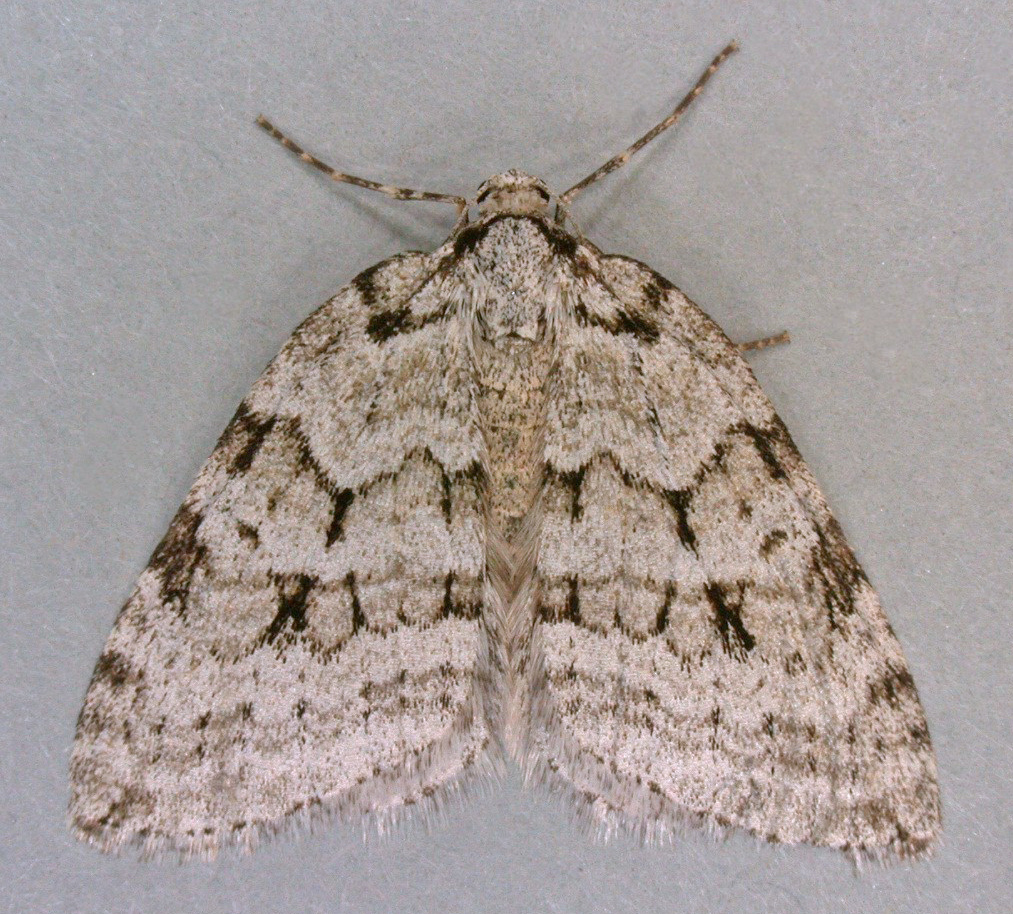

Scientific classification
- Domain: Eukaryota
- Kingdom: Animalia
- Phylum: Arthropoda
- Class: Insecta
- Order: Lepidoptera
- Family: Geometridae
- Genus: Epirrita
- Species: E. autumnata

Binomial name
- Epirrita autumnata (Borkhausen, 1794)

= Autumnal moth =

Species of moth

The autumnal moth (Epirrita autumnata) is a moth of the family Geometridae. The species was first described by Moritz Balthasar Borkhausen in 1794. It is found throughout the Palearctic region and the Near East and has a much wider distribution than its two close relatives (see below). In Sápmi (Lapland), in some years, the numerous autumnal moth larvae defoliate square miles of birch forests on mountains.

== Description ==
This species is very similar to the November moth, the small Autumnal moth, and the pale November moth, and identification is usually only possible by examining the genitalia. In general, this is the least variable of the four, with melanic forms occurring less often. It is also usually on the wing earlier in the year, flying in September and October, although the flight seasons of all three species overlap.

The caterpillar feeds on a wide variety of trees and shrubs. The species overwinters as an egg.

== Subspecies ==
- E. a. altivagata
- E. a. autumnata

== Notes ==
- The flight season refers to the British Isles. This may vary in other parts of the range.
