= Pasiphila hyrcanica =

Scientific classification
- Kingdom: Animalia
- Phylum: Arthropoda
- Clade: Pancrustacea
- Class: Insecta
- Order: Lepidoptera
- Family: Geometridae
- Genus: Pasiphila
- Species: P. hyrcanica

Binomial name
- Pasiphila hyrcanica Viidalepp & Mironov, 2006

Synonyms
- Rhinoprora talyshensis (nom. nud.)

Species of moth

Pasiphila hyrcanica is a moth in the family Geometridae. It was described by Jaan Viidalepp and Vladimir Mironov in 2006. It is found in Azerbaijan and Iran.

The wingspan is 16–19 millimetres (0.63–0.75 in). Adults have been recorded on wing from mid-May to late June.

The larvae possibly feed on the flower buds or flowers of Prunus or Crataegus species.

== Etymology ==
The species name is derived from that of the Hyrcanian biogeographical province.
