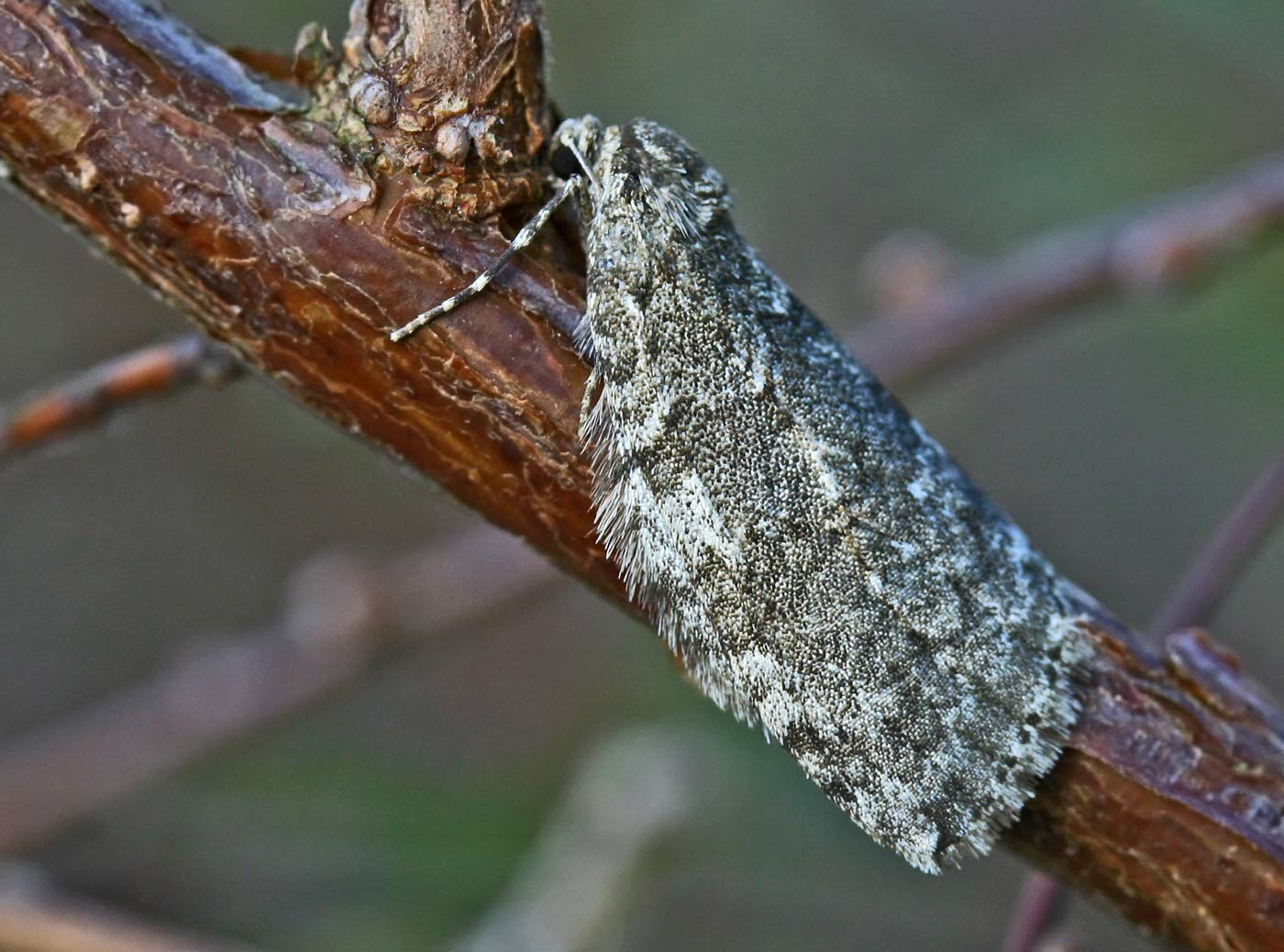

Scientific classification
- Kingdom: Animalia
- Phylum: Arthropoda
- Clade: Pancrustacea
- Class: Insecta
- Order: Lepidoptera
- Family: Geometridae
- Genus: Epirrita
- Species: E. dilutata

Binomial name
- Epirrita dilutata (Denis & Schiffermüller, 1775)

= November moth =

Species of moth

The November moth (Epirrita dilutata) is a moth of the family Geometridae. The species was first described by Michael Denis and Ignaz Schiffermüller in 1775. It can be found in the Palearctic realm in western Europe from central Scandinavia to the Mediterranean the Caucasus and western Russia.

== Description and life cycle ==
The wingspan is 38–44 mm, the forewings being variably marked with alternating pale and dark bands. The forewing ground colour is pale with darker grey and tinted brown. It has wavy lines. The hindwing is white grey with two lines. The distal fascia points in to the discal spot.

Melanism is common and in some locations all-dark individuals make up the majority of the population. The species is extremely similar to three of its relatives, the pale November moth, the autumnal moth and the small autumnal moth and they cannot usually be separated without examination of the genitalia. See Townsend et al.

The November moth flies at night from September to November, and is attracted to light and sometimes to nectar-rich flowers.

The caterpillar is found in late spring, and is green with red markings and feeds on a wide range of trees and shrubs. The species overwinters as an egg. There is one generation a year.

== Recorded food plants ==
- Acer - maple
- Betula - birch
- Corylus - hazel
- Crataegus - hawthorn
- Fraxinus - ash
- Malus - apple
- Prunus
- Quercus - oak
- Ulmus - elm

== Notes ==
1. The flight season refers to the British Isles. This may vary in other parts of the range.
