= Diphya leroyorum =

Leroy's Diphya Web Spider

Scientific classification
- Kingdom: Animalia
- Phylum: Arthropoda
- Subphylum: Chelicerata
- Class: Arachnida
- Order: Araneae
- Infraorder: Araneomorphae
- Family: Tetragnathidae
- Genus: Diphya
- Species: D. leroyorum

Binomial name
- Diphya leroyorum Omelko, Marusik & Lyle, 2020

Species of spider

Diphya leroyorum is a species of spider in the family Tetragnathidae. It is endemic to South Africa and is commonly known as Leroy's Diphya web spider.

== Distribution ==
Diphya leroyorum is known only from Mariepskop in Mpumalanga.

== Habitat and ecology ==
The species was collected from forest while sifting litter. The species range is very small.

== Description ==
Known only from males.

== Conservation ==
Diphya leroyorum is listed as Data Deficient by the South African National Biodiversity Institute for taxonomic reasons. More sampling is needed around Mariepskop to determine the range of the species and to collect females.
