= Haruchlora =

Scientific classification
- Kingdom: Animalia
- Phylum: Arthropoda
- Class: Insecta
- Order: Lepidoptera
- Family: Geometridae
- Genus: Haruchlora; Viidalepp & Lindt, 2014

Genus of butterflies

Haruchlora is a genus of butterflies belonging to the family Geometridae.

Species:

- Haruchlora maesi
