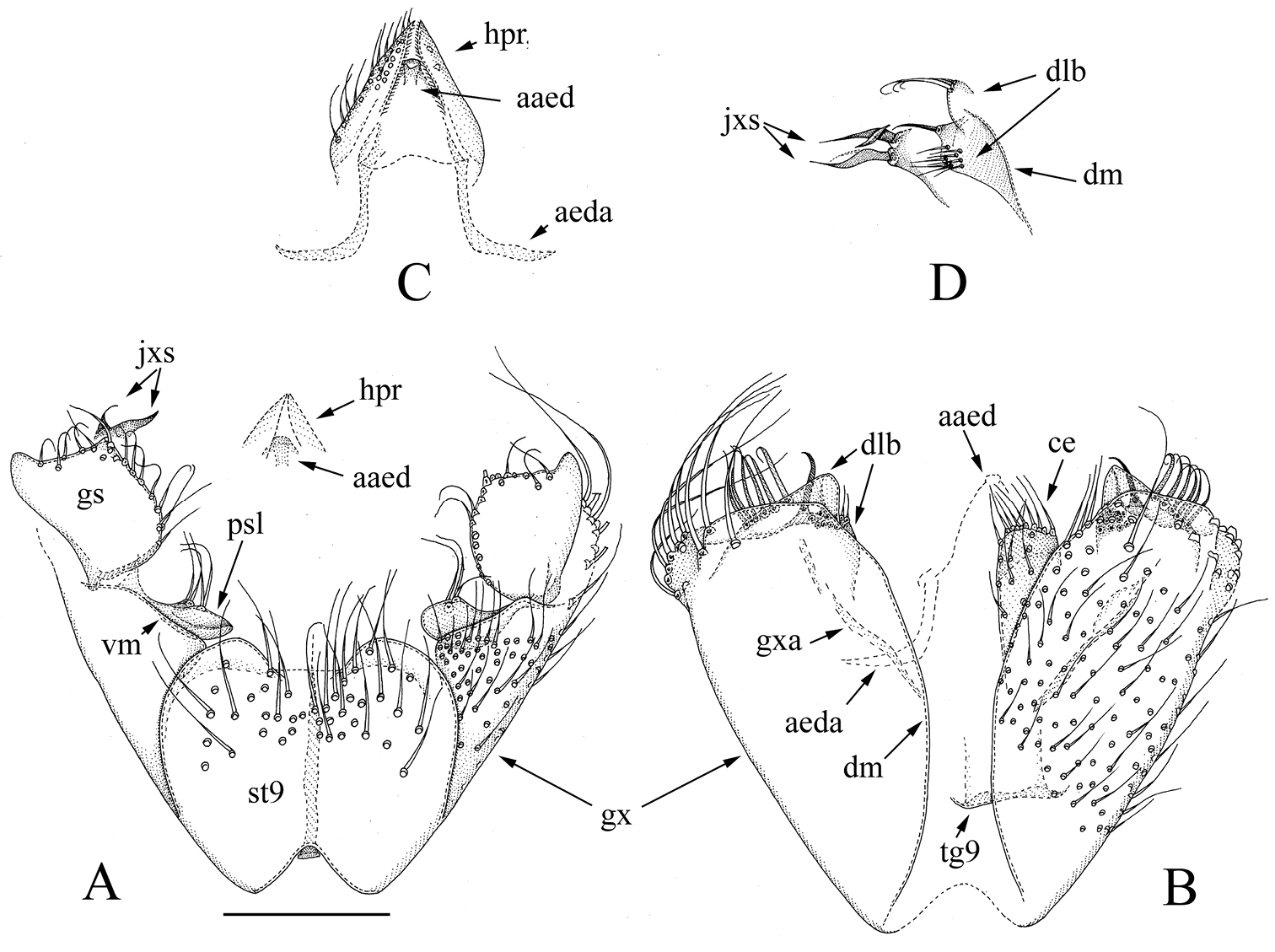
- manota_clava

Scientific classification
- Domain: Eukaryota
- Kingdom: Animalia
- Phylum: Arthropoda
- Class: Insecta
- Order: Diptera
- Family: Mycetophilidae
- Subfamily: Manotinae
- Genus: Manota; Williston, 1896

Type species
- Manota defecta Williston, 1896

= Manota =

Genus of flies

Manota is a genus of flies belonging to the family Mycetophilidae.

The genus has cosmopolitan distribution.

== Species ==
- Manota abakiga Hippa & Kurina, 2012
- Manota abbreviata Kurina, Hippa & Amorim, 2018
- Manota acehensis Hippa & Ševcík, 2010
- Manota aconcinna Hippa, 2007
- Manota aconcinna Hippa, 2008
- Manota acris Kurina & Hippa, 2015
- Manota aculifera Hippa & Kurina, 2012
- Manota acuminata Jaschhof & Hippa, 2005
- Manota acutangula Hippa, 2006
- Manota acutistylus Jaschhof & Hippa, 2005
- Manota adunca Hippa & Saigusa, 2016
- Manota afra Hippa & Kurina, 2012
- Manota aligera Hippa, Kurina & Sääksjärvi, 2017
- Manota alulata Kurina & Hippa, 2015
- Manota anafracta Hippa & Kurina, 2013
- Manota anceps Hippa & Ševcík, 2010
- Manota ancylochaeta Hippa, 2007
- Manota ancylochaeta Hippa, 2008
- Manota angustata Hippa, 2006
- Manota apentachaeta Kurina & Hippa, 2015
- Manota appendiculata Hippa & Kurina, 2013
- Manota aquila Hippa, 2011
- Manota arenalensis Jaschhof & Hippa, 2005
- Manota aristata Hippa & Kurina, 2013
- Manota aristoseta Hippa, Kurina & Sääksjärvi, 2017
- Manota atlantica Kurina, Hippa & Amorim, 2018
- Manota aureonigra Matile, 1979
- Manota auriculata Hippa, 2007
- Manota auriculata Hippa, 2008
- Manota avita Hippa, 2009
- Manota belalongensis Ševcík, Hippa & Wahab, 2014
- Manota bicuspis Hippa, 2007
- Manota bifida Hippa & Papp, 2007
- Manota bihamata Jaschhof & Hippa, 2005
- Manota biloba Hippa, 2006
- Manota bilobata Papp, 2004
- Manota birgitae Jaschhof & Jaschhof, 2010
- Manota bisulca Hippa & Kurina, 2013
- Manota biunculata Hippa, 2007
- Manota bracteata Hippa & Kurina, 2012
- Manota bruneiensis Hippa & Ševcík, 2010
- Manota burundiensis Hippa, Søli & Kurina, 2019
- Manota calcarata Hippa, 2006
- Manota calva Hippa, Kurina & Sääksjärvi, 2017
- Manota capillata Hippa & Ševcík, 2010
- Manota caribica Jaschhof & Hippa, 2005
- Manota carioca Kurina, Hippa & Amorim, 2018
- Manota cavata Kurina, Hippa & Amorim, 2018
- Manota cerciflex Hippa, 2006
- Manota chelapex Hippa, 2009
- Manota chi Hippa, 2009
- Manota chinensis Ševcik, 2002
- Manota ciliata Hippa, Kurina & Sääksjärvi, 2017
- Manota clausa Hippa, 2006
- Manota clava Kurina, Hippa & Amorim, 2017
- Manota clavulosa Hippa, 2007
- Manota clavulosa Hippa, 2008
- Manota clinochaeta Hippa, 2008
- Manota clinochaeta Hippa, 2008
- Manota clivicola Kurina & Hippa, 2015
- Manota clurina Hippa & Kurina, 2012
- Manota collina Hippa, 2007
- Manota collina Hippa, 2008
- Manota comata Hippa & Kurina, 2012
- Manota concolor Statz, 1944
- Manota confixa Hippa, 2007
- Manota confixa Hippa, 2008
- Manota corcovado Jaschhof & Hippa, 2005
- Manota cordata Kurina & Hippa, 2015
- Manota cornicula Kurina & Hippa, 2021
- Manota cornuta Hippa, Søli & Kurina, 2019
- Manota costaricensis Jaschhof & Hippa, 2005
- Manota crassiseta Matile, 1979
- Manota crinita Hippa, 2007
- Manota crinita Hippa, 2008
- Manota cristata Hippa, 2007
- Manota cristata Hippa, 2008
- Manota ctenophora Matile, 1993
- Manota cultigera Hippa, 2008
- Manota cultrigera Hippa, 2008
- Manota curvata Hippa, 2006
- Manota curvistylus Hippa, Kjaerandsen & Saigusa, 2011
- Manota defecta Williston, 1896
- Manota delyorum Papp, 2004
- Manota dentata Hippa & Papp, 2007
- Manota depilis Hippa & Kurina, 2013
- Manota digitata Hippa, Kurina & Sääksjärvi, 2017
- Manota dissaidens Hippa & Kurina, 2012
- Manota diversiseta Jaschhof & Hippa, 2005
- Manota dolichothrix Hippa & Ševcík, 2010
- Manota duplex Hippa, 2006
- Manota edentula Hippa, 2008
- Manota edentula Hippa, 2008
- Manota ephippiata Hippa, 2008
- Manota epigrata Hippa, 2009
- Manota evexa Hippa, 2007
- Manota exigua Hippa, Kurina & Sääksjärvi, 2017
- Manota eximia Jaschhof & Hippa, 2005
- Manota explicans Hippa, 2007
- Manota falcata Hippa, 2011
- Manota feminea Kurina & Hippa, 2015
- Manota fera Hippa, 2006
- Manota ferrata Hippa, 2006
- Manota fimbriata Hippa, 2007
- Manota fimbriata Hippa, 2008
- Manota flabellata Hippa, Kurina & Sääksjärvi, 2017
- Manota flammula Hippa, 2011
- Manota foliolata Hippa & Kurina, 2012
- Manota forceps Hippa & Papp, 2007
- Manota fraterna Jaschhof & Hippa, 2005
- Manota freerki Hippa & Kurina, 2012
- Manota furcata Søli, 1993
- Manota fusca Matile, 1972
- Manota fuscinula Hippa, Søli & Kurina, 2019
- Manota gemella Hippa, 2007
- Manota geniculata Hippa, Søli & Kurina, 2019
- Manota ghanaensis Hippa & Kurina, 2012
- Manota globigera Hippa, 2006
- Manota granvillensis Jaschhof & Jaschhof, 2010
- Manota grootaerti Kurina & Hippa, 2014
- Manota hanulata Colless, 1966
- Manota heptacantha Hippa, 2006
- Manota hexacantha Hippa & Ševcík, 2010
- Manota hidalgoensis Hippa & Huerta, 2009
- Manota hirsuta Hippa, 2007
- Manota hirta Kurina, Hippa & Amorim, 2018
- Manota horrida Hippa, 2006
- Manota hyboloma Hippa & Ševcík, 2010
- Manota ibanezi Hippa & Huerta, 2009
- Manota incilis Hippa & Saigusa, 2016
- Manota incisa Jaschhof & Hippa, 2005
- Manota indahae Hippa & Kjaerandsen, 2010
- Manota index Hippa, 2007
- Manota index Hippa, 2008
- Manota inermis Hippa & Kurina, 2013
- Manota inflata Hippa, 2007
- Manota inflata Hippa, 2008
- Manota inornata Jaschhof & Hippa, 2005
- Manota integra Hippa & Saigusa, 2016
- Manota intermedia Jaschhof & Hippa, 2005
- Manota inusitata Hippa & Papp, 2007
- Manota iota Hippa & Kurina, 2013
- Manota iquitosensis Hippa, Kurina & Sääksjärvi, 2017
- Manota issongo Matile, 1972
- Manota joerni Søli, 1993
- Manota juncta Hippa, 2007
- Manota juncta Hippa, 2008
- Manota kaindiensis Kurina & Hippa, 2015
- Manota kaspraki Ševcík, Hippa & Wahab, 2014
- Manota katusabei Hippa & Kurina, 2012
- Manota kerri Kurina, Hippa & Amorim, 2019
- Manota kilbaleensis Hippa & Kurina, 2012
- Manota kirkspriggsi Hippa, Søli & Kurina, 2019
- Manota kyushuensis Hippa, Kjaerandsen & Saigusa, 2011
- Manota lachaisei Matile, 1972
- Manota lamasi Kurina, Hippa & Amorim, 2018
- Manota lanesi Kurina, Hippa & Amorim, 2018
- Manota leptochaeta Hippa, Søli & Kurina, 2019
- Manota limai Hippa, Søli & Kurina, 2019
- Manota limonensis Jaschhof & Hippa, 2005
- Manota limulata Hippa, Kurina & Sääksjärvi, 2017
- Manota lunata Kurina & Hippa, 2015
- Manota mabokeensis Matile, 1972
- Manota macrodon Hippa, 2008
- Manota macrodon Hippa, 2008
- Manota macrothrix Ševcík, Hippa & Wahab, 2014
- Manota major Jaschhof & Hippa, 2005
- Manota maorica Edwards, 1927
- Manota mazumbaiensis Søli, 1993
- Manota megachaeta Ševcík, Hippa & Wahab, 2014
- Manota meilingae Papp, 2004
- Manota mexicapan Hippa & Huerta, 2009
- Manota micella Hippa, Kurina & Sääksjärvi, 2017
- Manota micula Hippa & Kurina, 2013
- Manota minutula Hippa, Kurina & Sääksjärvi, 2017
- Manota mirifica Hippa & Papp, 2007
- Manota mitrata Hippa & Saigusa, 2016
- Manota montana Søli, 1993
- Manota montivaga Jaschhof & Hippa, 2005
- Manota multilobata Kurina, Hippa & Amorim, 2017
- Manota multisetosa Jaschhof & Hippa, 2005
- Manota natalensis Jaschhof & Mostovski, 2006
- Manota nepalensis Hippa & Saigusa, 2016
- Manota nigra Matile, 1972
- Manota nimia Kurina & Hippa, 2015
- Manota nordestina Kurina, Hippa & Amorim, 2018
- Manota nubicola Hippa & Huerta, 2009
- Manota nuda Hippa, Kurina & Sääksjärvi, 2017
- Manota oblonga Hippa, 2007
- Manota oblonga Hippa, 2008
- Manota obtecta Hippa, 2009
- Manota occulta Hippa & Papp, 2007
- Manota oligochaeta Hippa, 2006
- Manota oliveirai Kurina, Hippa & Amorim, 2018
- Manota omotoensis Hippa, Kjaerandsen & Saigusa, 2011
- Manota orientalis Senior-White, 1922
- Manota oronnai Hippa, Søli & Kurina, 2019
- Manota orthacantha Hippa, 2007
- Manota ovata Hippa, 2006
- Manota pacifica Edwards, 1928
- Manota palpalis Lane, 1948
- Manota panda Hippa & Kurina, 2013
- Manota paniculata Kurina, Hippa & Amorim, 2018
- Manota papaveroi Kurina, Hippa & Amorim, 2018
- Manota papillosa Hippa & Kurina, 2013
- Manota pappi Hippa, 2006
- Manota parilis Hippa, 2007
- Manota parva Jaschhof & Hippa, 2005
- Manota parvistylata Hippa, 2007
- Manota parvistylata Hippa, 2008
- Manota parvula Hippa, Kurina & Sääksjärvi, 2017
- Manota patula Hippa & Kurina, 2013
- Manota paula Hippa & Kurina, 2013
- Manota pauloides Hippa, Kurina & Sääksjärvi, 2017
- Manota pectinata Hippa, 2006
- Manota pedicillata Hippa & Kurina, 2012
- Manota pellii Hippa, 2007
- Manota pellii Hippa, 2008
- Manota peltata Kurina & Hippa, 2014
- Manota peltigera Kurina & Hippa, 2014
- Manota penicillata Jaschhof & Hippa, 2005
- Manota pentacantha Hippa, 2007
- Manota pentachaeta Kurina & Hippa, 2015
- Manota perangulata Hippa & Ševcík, 2010
- Manota periotoi Kurina, Hippa & Amorim, 2018
- Manota perissochaeta Hippa, 2007
- Manota perlobata Hippa, 2007
- Manota perlobata Hippa, 2008
- Manota perparva Kurina, Hippa & Amorim, 2018
- Manota perplexa Kurina, Hippa & Amorim, 2017
- Manota perpusilla Hippa, 2006
- Manota pesudocavata Kurina & Hippa, 2021
- Manota petiolata Hippa & Kurina, 2012
- Manota phyllochaeta Hippa, 2008
- Manota phyllochaeta Hippa, 2008
- Manota piliata Ševcík, Hippa & Wahab, 2014
- Manota pilosa Hippa & Kurina, 2012
- Manota pinnata Hippa & Kurina, 2012
- Manota pinnulata Hippa & Kurina, 2012
- Manota pisinna Hippa & Kurina, 2013
- Manota planilobata Hippa, 2007
- Manota planilobata Hippa, 2008
- Manota planistylus Jaschhof & Hippa, 2005
- Manota platychaeta Hippa, Søli & Kurina, 2019
- Manota plusiochaeta Hippa, 2006
- Manota pollex Hippa, 2006
- Manota polylobata Hippa, Søli & Kurina, 2019
- Manota prisca Hippa, 2009
- Manota procera Hippa, 2006
- Manota pseudoiota Kurina, Hippa & Amorim, 2018
- Manota purakaunui Jaschhof & Jaschhof, 2010
- Manota pustulosa Hippa, Kurina & Sääksjärvi, 2017
- Manota quantilla Hippa & Kurina, 2013
- Manota quantula Hippa & Kurina, 2013
- Manota radula Hippa & Ševcík, 2010
- Manota rara Jaschhof & Hippa, 2005
- Manota reclinata Kurina & Hippa, 2014
- Manota rectolobata Jaschhof & Hippa, 2005
- Manota redunca Hippa & Kurina, 2012
- Manota regineae Jaschhof & Jaschhof, 2010
- Manota relicina Hippa & Kurina, 2012
- Manota ricina Ševcík, Hippa & Wahab, 2014
- Manota roslii Hippa, 2006
- Manota rostrata Kurina, Hippa & Amorim, 2018
- Manota rotundistylus Jaschhof & Hippa, 2005
- Manota saepium Matile, 1972
- Manota sanctavirginae Kurina, Hippa & Amorim, 2018
- Manota satoyamanis Hippa & Kjaerandsen, 2010
- Manota secreta Hippa & Papp, 2007
- Manota seducta Hippa, 2009
- Manota semina Hippa & Kurina, 2012
- Manota senta Hippa & Kurina, 2013
- Manota senticosa Hippa & Kurina, 2012
- Manota serawei Hippa, 2007
- Manota sericulata Kurina, Hippa & Amorim, 2018
- Manota serrata Søli, 1993
- Manota serrulata Hippa, Kurina & Sääksjärvi, 2017
- Manota sespinaea Søli, 1993
- Manota setilobata Kurina, Hippa & Amorim, 2017
- Manota siciliculata Kurina & Hippa, 2015
- Manota sicula Hippa, 2007
- Manota sigma Kurina & Hippa, 2015
- Manota silvai Kurina, Hippa & Amorim, 2018
- Manota simplex Hippa, 2006
- Manota sinepollex Hippa & Ševcík, 2010
- Manota spadix Hippa, 2006
- Manota spathula Hippa, 2007
- Manota spinosa Jaschhof & Hippa, 2005
- Manota squamulata Jaschhof & Hippa, 2005
- Manota stricta Hippa & Ševcík, 2010
- Manota styloides Søli, 1993
- Manota subaristata Kurina, Hippa & Amorim, 2017
- Manota subcollina Hippa, 2011
- Manota subdentata Hippa, 2007
- Manota subdentata Hippa, 2008
- Manota subferrata Hippa, 2009
- Manota subforceps Hippa & Ševcík, 2010
- Manota submirifica Hippa, 2007
- Manota submirifica Hippa, 2008
- Manota subspathula Hippa, 2007
- Manota taedia Matile, 1993
- Manota tapantiensis Jaschhof & Hippa, 2005
- Manota tavaresi Kurina, Hippa & Amorim, 2018
- Manota tayal Hippa & Saigusa, 2016
- Manota teocchii Matile, 1972
- Manota tetrachaeta Hippa, 2009
- Manota toomasi Hippa & Kurina, 2012
- Manota toroensis Hippa & Kurina, 2012
- Manota transversa Hippa, 2006
- Manota tricuspis Hippa, 2007
- Manota tridactyla Søli, 1993
- Manota tripectinata Hippa, Kjaerandsen & Saigusa, 2011
- Manota triseta Hippa, Søli & Kurina, 2019
- Manota truuverki Kurina & Hippa, 2021
- Manota tunoae Hippa & Kjaerandsen, 2010
- Manota ulu Hippa, 2006
- Manota uncinata Hippa, 2008
- Manota uncinata Hippa, 2008
- Manota unifurcata Lundström, 1913
- Manota unisetata Kurina & Hippa, 2015
- Manota unispinata Kurina, Hippa & Amorim, 2018
- Manota usubi Hippa & Kurina, 2012
- Manota vesca Hippa & Saigusa, 2016
- Manota vesicaria Hippa, 2009
- Manota vexillifera Jaschhof & Hippa, 2005
- Manota virgata Hippa & Kurina, 2013
- Manota vladi Kurina & Hippa, 2021
- Manota whiteleyi Jaschhof & Mostovski, 2006
- Manota williamsi Kurina, Hippa & Amorim, 2019
- Manota wittei Kurina & Hippa, 2014
- Manota yaeyamaensis Hippa, Kjaerandsen & Saigusa, 2011
- Manota yongi Hippa, 2006
