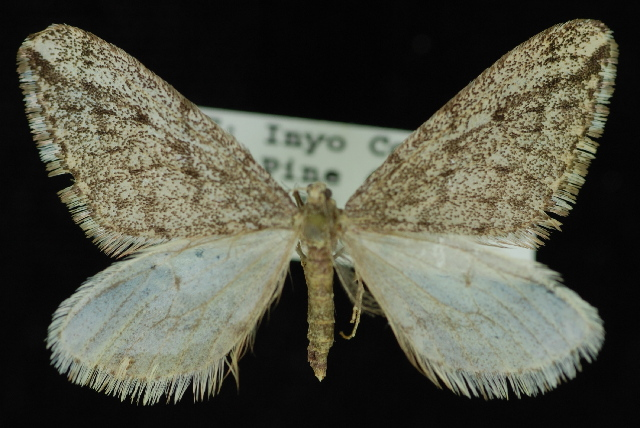
- Tescalsia giulianiata (male)

Scientific classification
- Kingdom: Animalia
- Phylum: Arthropoda
- Class: Insecta
- Order: Lepidoptera
- Family: Geometridae
- Tribe: Operophterini
- Genus: Tescalsia; Ferguson, 1994

= Tescalsia =

Genus of moths

Tescalsia is a genus of moths in the family Geometridae first described by Alexander Douglas Campbell Ferguson in 1994.

== Species ==
- Tescalsia giulianiata Ferguson, 1994
- Tescalsia minata Ferguson, 1994
