= Puhja =

Borough in Estonia

- Small borough
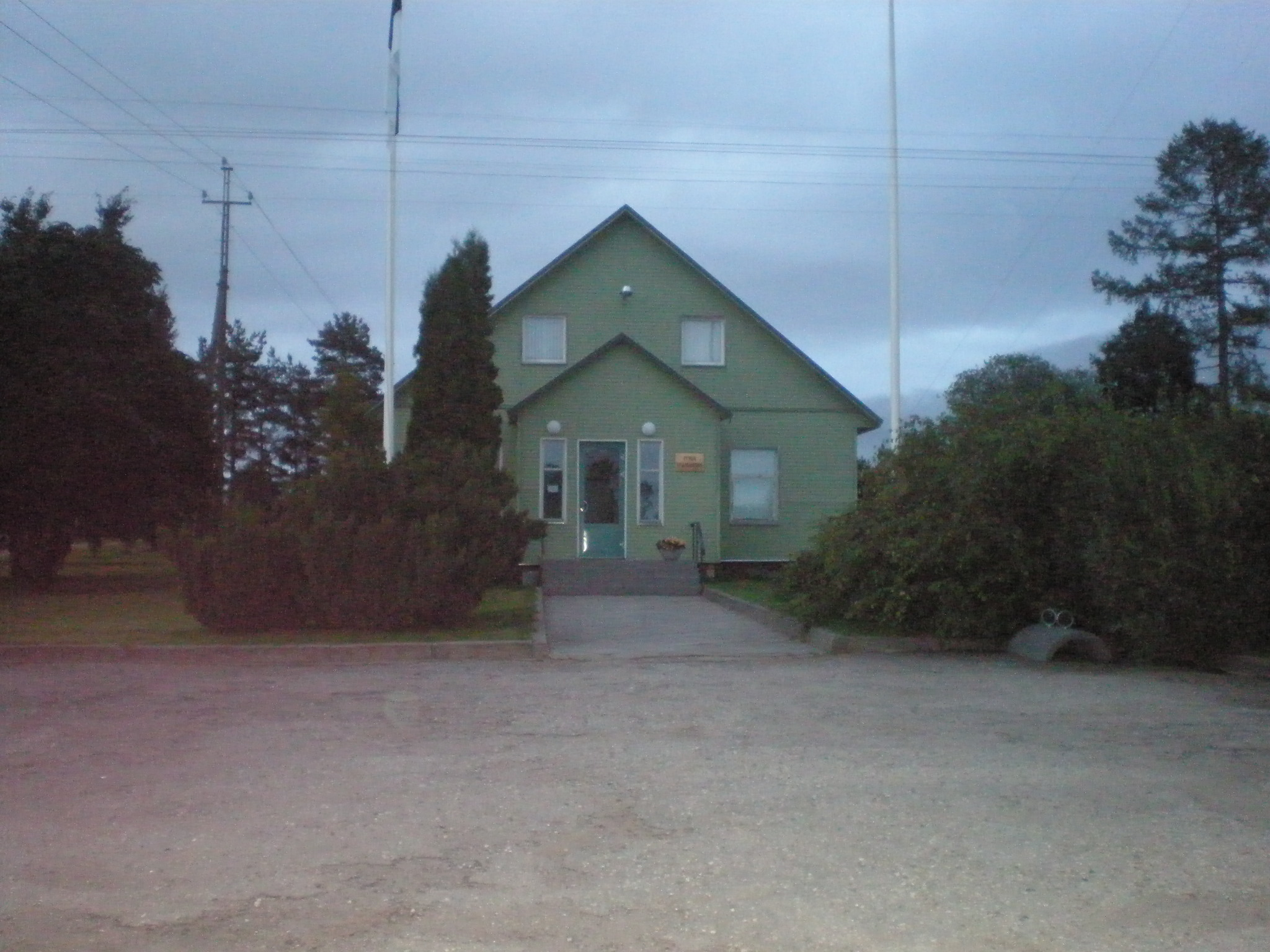
- The local government building of Puhja Parish.

- Location in Estonia
- Coordinates: 58°20′18″N 26°18′43″E
- Country: Estonia
- County: Tartu County
- Municipality: Elva Parish

Population (01.01.2021)
  - Total: 859
- Time zone: UTC+2 (EET)
  - Summer (DST): UTC+3 (EEST)

Drone video of Puhja in August 2022

Puhja (German: Kawelecht) is a small borough (Estonian: alevik) in Tartu County, in Elva Parish Estonia. It was the administrative centre of Puhja Parish. Puhja has a population of 859 (as of 1 January 2021).

Puhja church, originally dedicated to St. Dionysius, dates from the mid-14th century. It is built of brick, typically for medieval churches in south Estonia. After being damaged during the 15th century, it was substantially rebuilt around 1490. The Baroque tower spire dates from the 18th century, while the interior is mostly Neo-Gothic and dates from the 19th century. In the adjacent cemetery, there are memorials dedicated to local pastor and translator Adrian Virginius (1663-1706) and poet Käsu Hans (died 1715).

== Notable people ==
Notable people that were born or lived in Puhja include:

- Hans Kauri (1906–1999), entomologist and politician
- Kuldar Sikk (born 1979), professional rally co-driver
