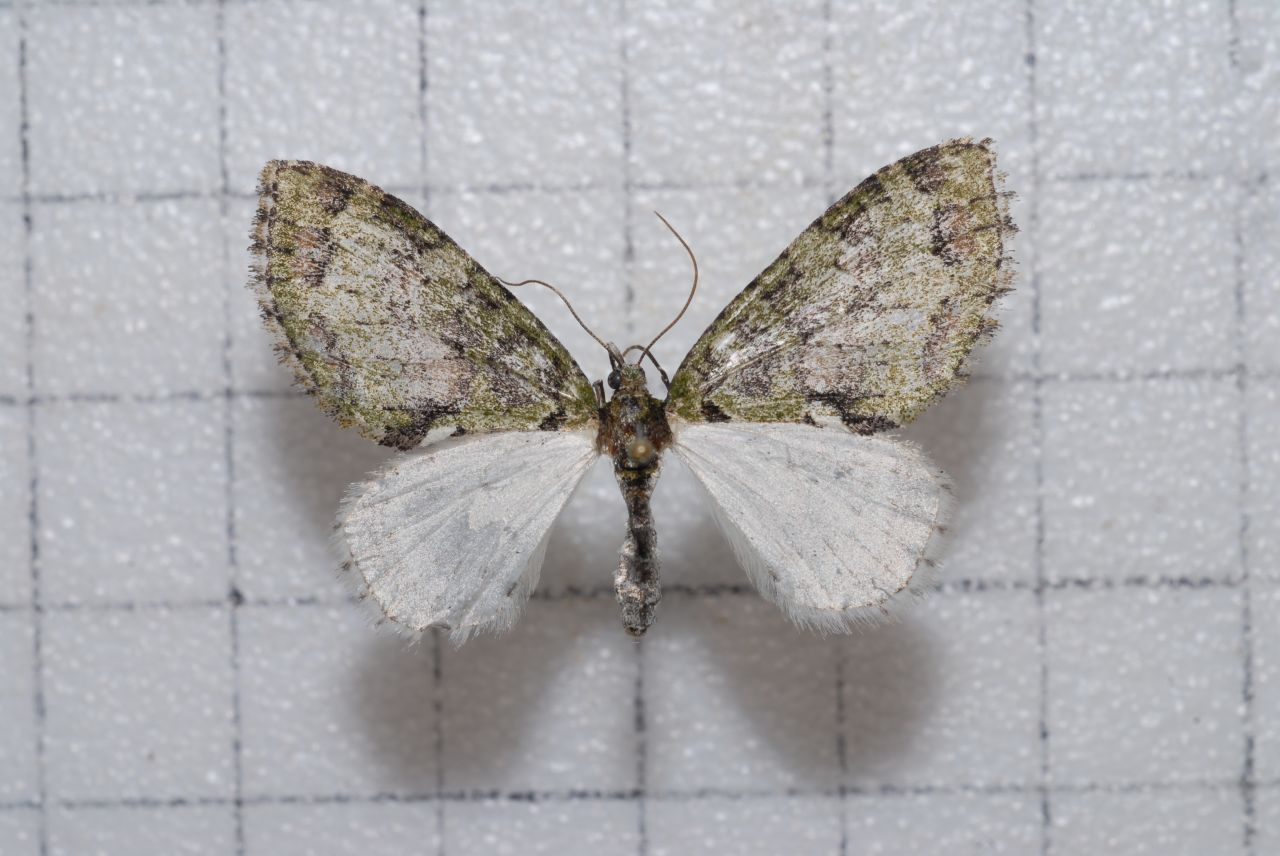

Scientific classification
- Domain: Eukaryota
- Kingdom: Animalia
- Phylum: Arthropoda
- Class: Insecta
- Order: Lepidoptera
- Family: Geometridae
- Genus: Epirrita
- Species: E. faenaria

Binomial name
- Epirrita faenaria (Bastelberger, 1911)

Synonyms
- Hydriomena faenaria Bastelberger, 1911

= Epirrita faenaria =

Species of moth

Epirrita faenaria is a moth in the family Geometridae. It is found in Taiwan.
