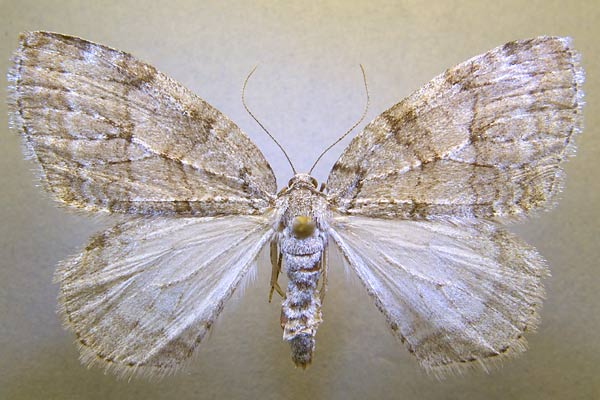
- Epirrita autumnata

Scientific classification
- Kingdom: Animalia
- Phylum: Arthropoda
- Clade: Pancrustacea
- Class: Insecta
- Order: Lepidoptera
- Family: Geometridae
- Subfamily: Larentiinae
- Tribe: Operophterini
- Genus: Epirrita; Hübner, 1822

= Epirrita =

Genus of moths

Epirrita is a genus of geometer moths first described by Jacob Hübner in 1822. They are on the wing from late August to November.

== Species ==
- Epirrita autumnata (Borkhausen, 1794)
- Epirrita christyi (Allen, 1906)
- Epirrita dilutata (Denis & Schiffermüller, 1775)
- Epirrita faenaria (Bastelberger, 1911)
- Epirrita filigrammaria (Herrich-Schäffer, 1846)
- Epirrita pulchraria (Taylor, 1907)
- Epirrita terminassiae (Vardikjan, 1974)
- Epirrita undulata (Harrison, 1942)
