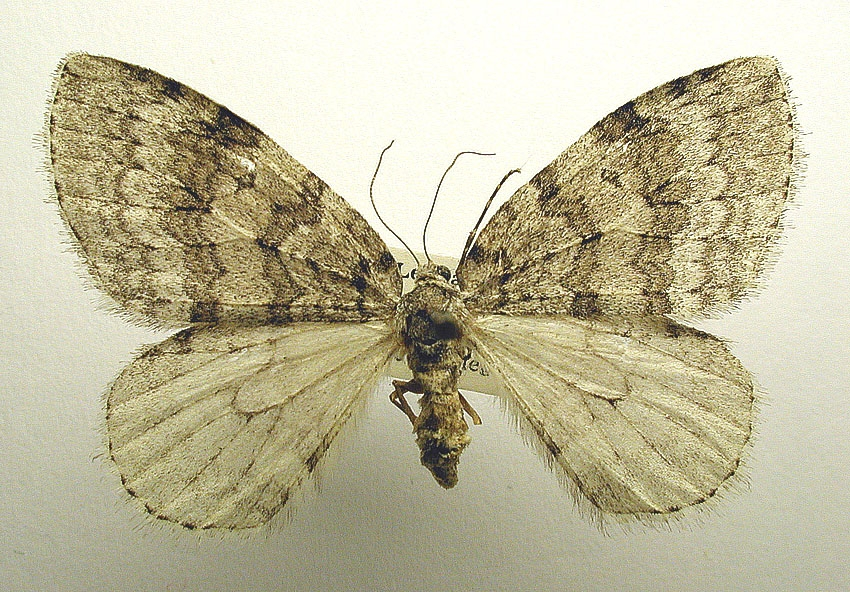
- Mounted
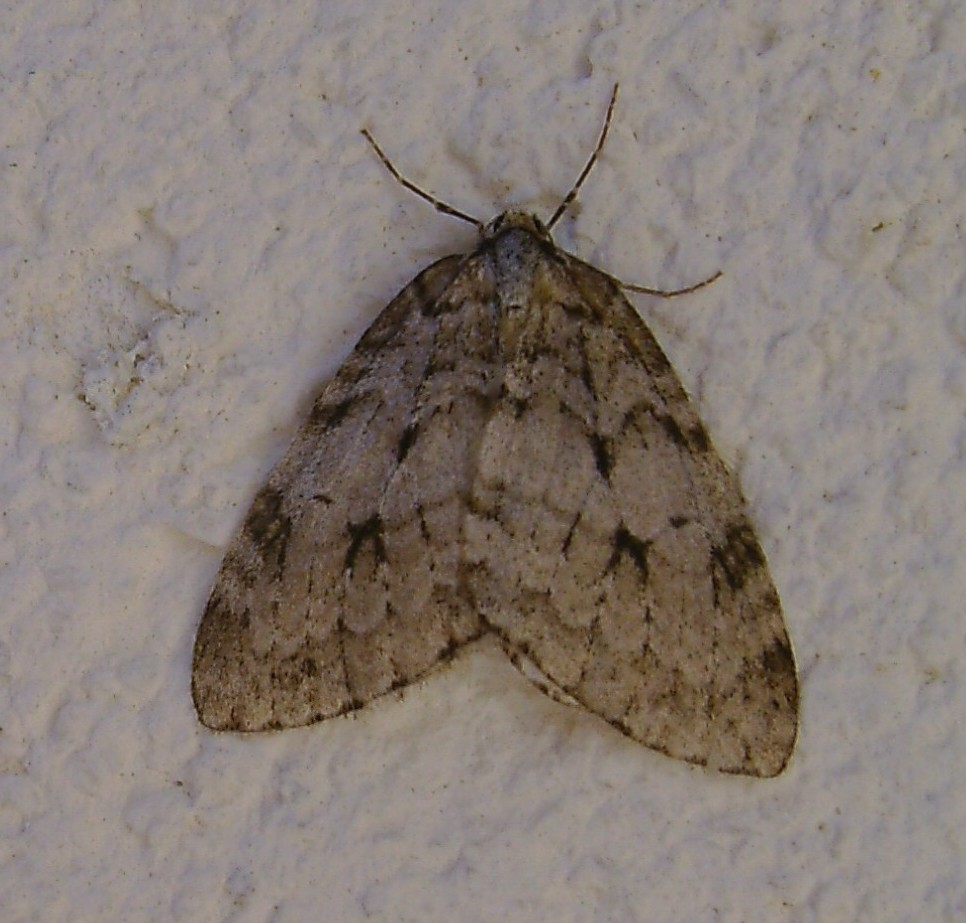
- Live adult

Scientific classification
- Kingdom: Animalia
- Phylum: Arthropoda
- Class: Insecta
- Order: Lepidoptera
- Family: Geometridae
- Genus: Epirrita
- Species: E. christyi

Binomial name
- Epirrita christyi (Allen, 1906)

= Pale November moth =

Species of moth

The pale November moth (Epirrita christyi) is a moth of the family Geometridae. The species was first described by Allen in 1906. It is a fairly common species in Western Europe including the British Isles.

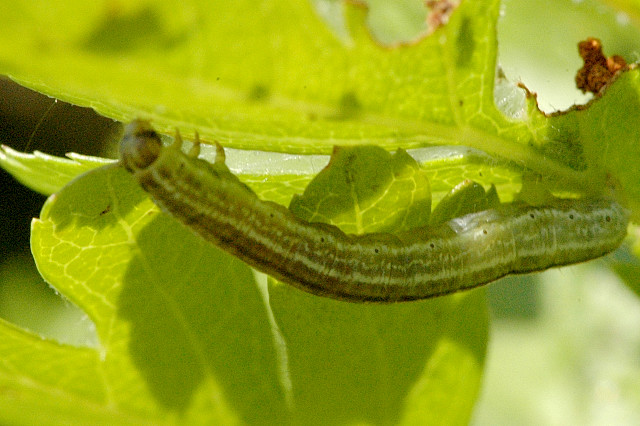
Caterpillar

This species is almost identical to its relatives the November moth, the small autumnal moth and the autumnal moth and it is almost impossible to identify them without examination of the genitalia. See Townsend et al. In general, although melanism occurs regularly in this species it is less prevalent than in the November moth.

The pale November moth flies at night from September to November and is attracted to light.

The larva feeds on a variety of trees and shrubs (see list below). The species overwinters as an egg.

1. The flight season refers to the British Isles. This may vary in other parts of the range.

== Recorded food plants ==
- Acer - maple
- Betula - birch
- Corylus - hazel
- Crataegus - hawthorn
- Fagus - beech
- Prunus
- Quercus - oak
- Sorbus
- Ulmus - elm
