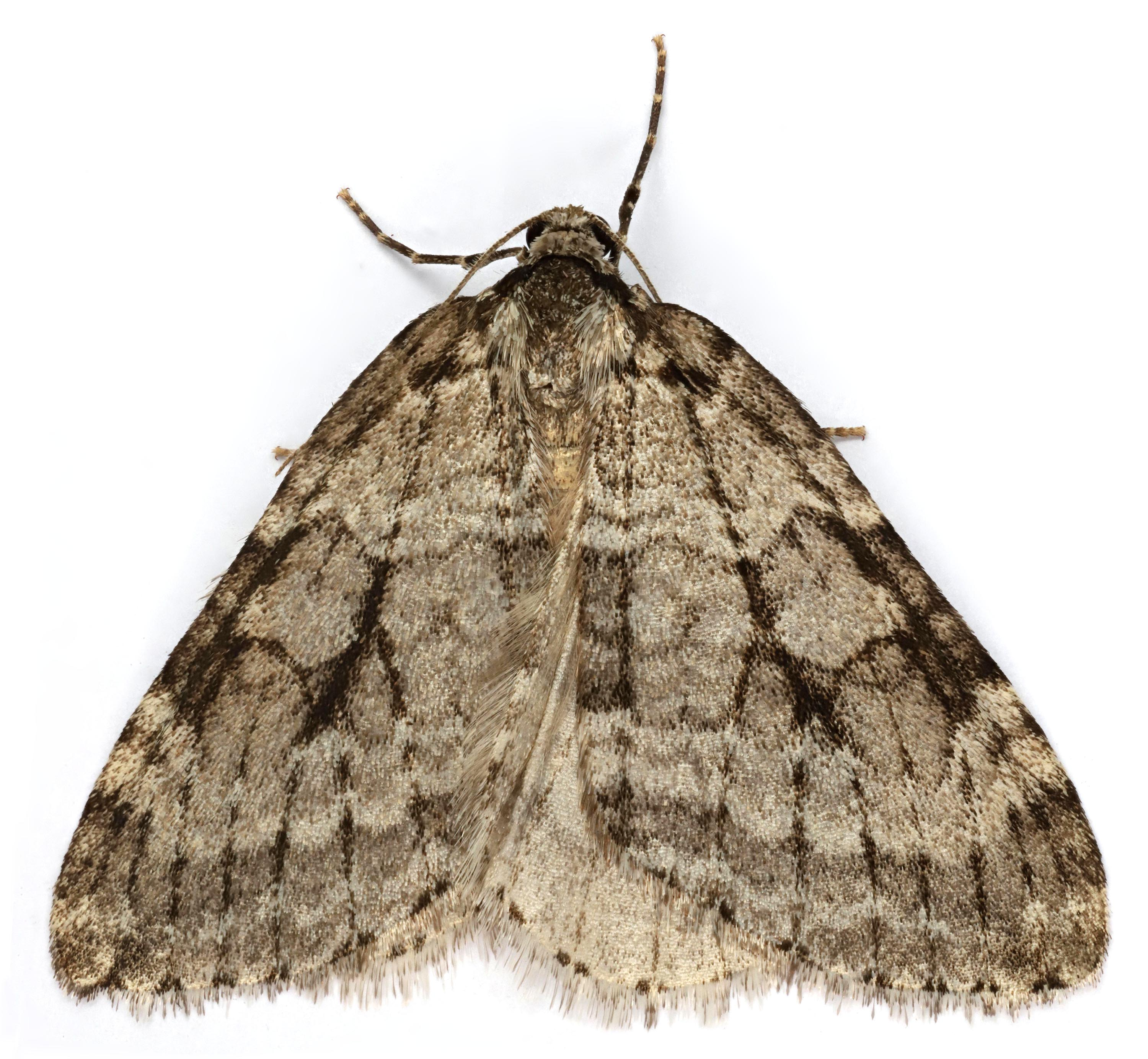

Scientific classification
- Kingdom: Animalia
- Phylum: Arthropoda
- Clade: Pancrustacea
- Class: Insecta
- Order: Lepidoptera
- Family: Geometridae
- Genus: Epirrita
- Species: E. filigrammaria

Binomial name
- Epirrita filigrammaria (Herrich-Schäffer, 1846)

Synonyms
- Larentia filigrammaria Herrich-Schaffer, 1846; Oporabia filigrammaria

= Epirrita filigrammaria =

Species of moth

Epirrita filigrammaria, the small autumnal moth or small autumnal carpet, is a moth of the family Geometridae. The species was first described by Gottlieb August Wilhelm Herrich-Schäffer in 1846. It is found in Scotland, northern England, Wales and Ireland. Epirrita filigrammaria is endemic to the British Isles

The wingspan is 30–38 mm. The ground colour is greyish brown. There are a few small dark bands across the forewings (sometimes obscure) and a well-defined fringe along the edge of the forewings. It is very similar to its congeners, the autumnal moth (Epirrita autumnata), the November moth (Epirrita dilutata ) and the pale November moth (Epirrita christyi) . See Townsend et al.

The moth flies in August and September.

The larvae feed on heather (Calluna vulgaris) and bilberry (Vaccinium myrtillus).
