= Manotinae =

Scientific classification
- Domain: Eukaryota
- Kingdom: Animalia
- Phylum: Arthropoda
- Class: Insecta
- Order: Diptera
- Family: Mycetophilidae
- Subfamily: Manotinae; Edwards, 1925

Subfamily of flies

Manotinae is a subfamily of fungus gnats (insects in the family Mycetophilidae).

== Genera ==
- Alavamanota Blagoderov & Arillo, 2002
- Eumanota Edwards, 1933
- Manota Williston, 1896
- Paramanota Tuomikoski, 1966
- Promanota Tuomikoski, 1966
