= Käsu Hans =

Estonian poet (fl. 18th century)

Käsu Hans (birth date unknown, died probably in 1715 or 1734) was an Estonian poet. He is the first known native Estonian writer. He is mostly known by his poem "Oh! ma vaene Tardo-liin" ('Ah Me! Poor Tartu Town!').

Little is known about its life. He was a clergyman in Puhja.

His most famous lamentable poem "Oh! ma vaene Tardo-liin" was written in 1708 and its content is related to Tartu in the time of the Great Northern War, when Tartu was almost completely destroyed. The poem has thirty-two stanzas. The poems is written in South Estonian.
