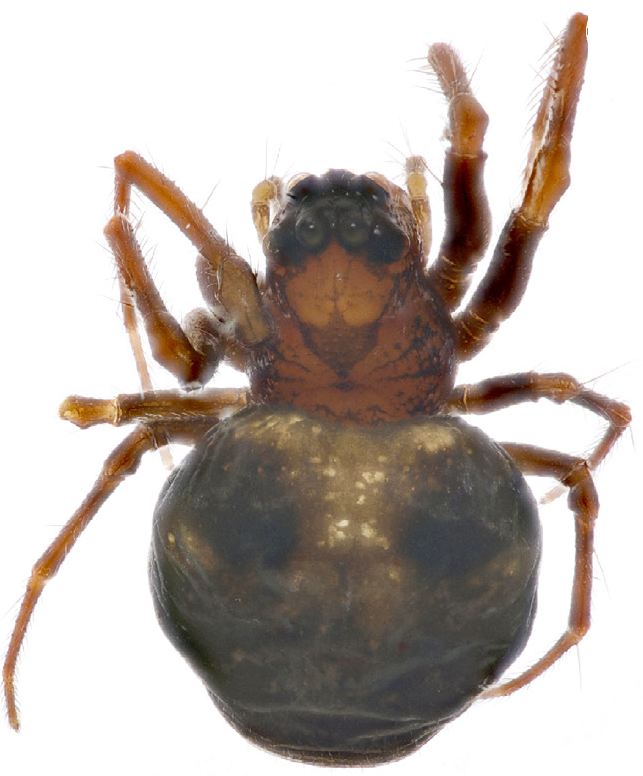
- Dorsal view of Diphya vanderwalta

Scientific classification
- Kingdom: Animalia
- Phylum: Arthropoda
- Subphylum: Chelicerata
- Class: Arachnida
- Order: Araneae
- Infraorder: Araneomorphae
- Family: Tetragnathidae
- Genus: Diphya
- Species: D. vanderwaltae

Binomial name
- Diphya vanderwaltae Omelko, Marusik & Lyle, 2020

= Diphya vanderwaltae =

Vanderwalt's Diphya Web Spider

Species of spider

Diphya vanderwaltae is a species of spider in the family Tetragnathidae. It is endemic to South Africa and is commonly known as Vanderwalt's Diphya web spider.

== Distribution ==
Diphya vanderwaltae is known only from Cwebe Nature Reserve in the Eastern Cape.

== Habitat and ecology ==
The species was collected while sifting leaf litter from coastal dune forest. The species range is very small.

== Description ==
The species is only known from females.The female of Diphya vanderwaltae is small (total length ~3.3 mm (0.13 in)) and predominantly dark: a dark-brown carapace with an indistinct median band, a uniformly black sternum, dark-grey femora with fine yellowish longitudinal lines, and a largely patternless dark-grey abdomen with a few guanine spots; the epigyne bears a triangular septum with closely spaced copulatory openings.

== Conservation ==
Diphya vanderwaltae is listed as Data Deficient by the South African National Biodiversity Institute for taxonomic reasons. A rare species, more sampling is needed around Cwebe to determine the range and to collect males.
