= Vallichlora =

Scientific classification
- Kingdom: Animalia
- Phylum: Arthropoda
- Class: Insecta
- Order: Lepidoptera
- Family: Geometridae
- Genus: Vallichlora; Viidalepp & Lindt 2019

Genus of butterflies

Vallichlora is a genus of butterflies belonging to the family Geometridae.

Species:

- Vallichlora rara Viidalepp & Lindt, 2019
- Vallichlora selva Viidalepp & Lindt, 2019
