= Diphya foordi =

Foord's Diphya Web Spider

Scientific classification
- Kingdom: Animalia
- Phylum: Arthropoda
- Subphylum: Chelicerata
- Class: Arachnida
- Order: Araneae
- Infraorder: Araneomorphae
- Family: Tetragnathidae
- Genus: Diphya
- Species: D. foordi

Binomial name
- Diphya foordi Omelko, Marusik & Lyle, 2020

Species of spider

Diphya foordi is a species of spider in the family Tetragnathidae. It is endemic to South Africa and is commonly known as Foord's Diphya web spider.

== Distribution ==
Diphya foordi is found in four South African provinces: Eastern Cape, Limpopo, Mpumalanga, and Western Cape. Notable locations include Addo National Park, Lekgalameetse Nature Reserve, and Goukamma Nature Reserve.

== Habitat and ecology ==
The species has been collected at low altitudes in grasses, sometimes with sweep nets, mainly from the Fynbos, Grassland and Savanna biomes.

== Description ==
Both sexes are known.

== Etymology ==
The species is named after South African arachnologist Stefan Hendrik Foord (1971-2023).

== Conservation ==
Diphya foordi is listed as Least Concern by the South African National Biodiversity Institute due to its wide geographical range. The species is protected in several areas including Addo National Park, Luvhonda Mountain Retreat, Mariepskop, and Lekgalameetse Nature Reserve.
