= Adrian Virginius =

Estonian translator

Adrian Virginius (30 November 1663 – 27 June or 8 July 1706) was a Baltic-German clergyman, translator, and linguist.

From 1686 to 1694, he worked as a pastor in Puhja, Tartu County. In 1694 he continued his clerical work in Otepää.

He was the editor and publisher of Wastne Testament (The New Testament), which was written in the South Estonian dialect. This book is the first complete copy of the New Testament in Estonian. At the same time, this is the first book that was completely written in Estonian.
