= Epirrita pulchraria =

Scientific classification
- Domain: Eukaryota
- Kingdom: Animalia
- Phylum: Arthropoda
- Class: Insecta
- Order: Lepidoptera
- Family: Geometridae
- Tribe: Operophterini
- Genus: Epirrita
- Species: E. pulchraria

Binomial name
- Epirrita pulchraria (Taylor, 1907)

Species of moth

Epirrita pulchraria, the whitelined looper, is a species of geometrid moth in the family Geometridae.

The MONA or Hodges number for Epirrita pulchraria is 7435.
