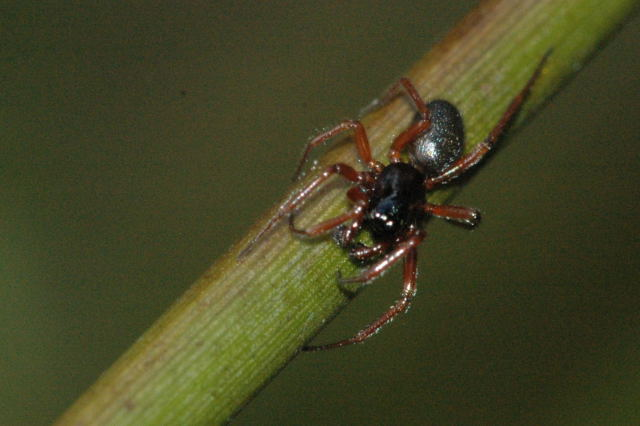
- L. punctatum

Scientific classification
- Kingdom: Animalia
- Phylum: Arthropoda
- Subphylum: Chelicerata
- Class: Arachnida
- Order: Araneae
- Infraorder: Araneomorphae
- Family: Linyphiidae
- Genus: Lophomma; Menge, 1868

Type species
- L. punctatum (Blackwall, 1841)

Species
- L. depressum (Emerton, 1882) – USA; L. punctatum (Blackwall, 1841) – Europe, Russia (Europe to South Siberia); L. vaccinii (Emerton, 1926) – USA (incl. Alaska), Canada, Russia (Urals to Far East)

= Lophomma =

Genus of spiders

Lophomma is a genus of dwarf spiders that was first described by Anton Menge in 1868. As of May 2019 it contains only three species, found in Canada, Russia, and the United States: L. depressum, L. punctatum, and L. vaccinii.
