= Chrysometa =

Scientific classification
- Kingdom: Animalia
- Phylum: Arthropoda
- Subphylum: Chelicerata
- Class: Arachnida
- Order: Araneae
- Infraorder: Araneomorphae
- Family: Tetragnathidae
- Genus: Chrysometa; Simon, 1894

Type species
- C. tenuipes (Keyserling, 1864)

Species
- 146, see text

Synonyms
- Capichameta Soares & Camargo, 1955

Genus of spiders

Chrysometa is a genus of long-jawed orb-weavers that was first described by Eugène Louis Simon in 1894. It is a senior synonym of Capichameta.

== Species ==
As of October 2019 it contains 146 species, found in the Caribbean, Central America, South America, and Mexico:

- C. acinosa Álvarez-Padilla, 2007 – Chile
- C. adelis Levi, 1986 – Colombia
- C. alajuela Levi, 1986 – Costa Rica to Colombia
- C. alboguttata (O. Pickard-Cambridge, 1889) – Mexico to Colombia
- C. allija Levi, 1986 – Ecuador
- C. antonio Levi, 1986 – Colombia
- C. aramba Levi, 1986 – Brazil
- C. atotonilco Salgueiro-Sepúlveda & Álvarez-Padilla, 2018 – Mexico
- C. aureola (Keyserling, 1884) – Brazil, Trinidad
- C. banos Levi, 1986 – Ecuador
- C. bella (Banks, 1909) – Costa Rica
- C. bigibbosa (Keyserling, 1864) – Colombia
- C. bolivari Levi, 1986 – Ecuador
- C. bolivia Levi, 1986 – Bolivia, Colombia
- C. boquete Levi, 1986 – Panama, Colombia
- C. boraceia Levi, 1986 – Brazil, Paraguay, Uruguay
- C. brevipes (O. Pickard-Cambridge, 1889) – Mexico, Guatemala
- C. browni Levi, 1986 – Ecuador
- C. buenaventura Levi, 1986 – Colombia
- C. buga Levi, 1986 – Colombia
- C. butamalal Levi, 1986 – Chile
- C. cali Levi, 1986 – Colombia
- C. calima Levi, 1986 – Colombia
- C. cambara Levi, 1986 – Brazil
- C. candianii Nogueira, Pena-Barbosa, Venticinque & Brescovit, 2011 – Brazil
- C. carmelo Levi, 1986 – Colombia
- C. cebolleta Levi, 1986 – Colombia
- C. chica Levi, 1986 – Ecuador
- C. chipinque Levi, 1986 – Mexico, Guatemala
- C. choroni Levi, 1986 – Venezuela
- C. chulumani Levi, 1986 – Bolivia
- C. churitepui Levi, 1986 – Venezuela
- C. citlaltepetl Salgueiro-Sepúlveda & Álvarez-Padilla, 2018 – Mexico
- C. claudia Levi, 1986 – Venezuela
- C. columbicola Strand, 1916 – Colombia
- C. conspersa (Bryant, 1945) – Hispaniola
- C. cornuta (Bryant, 1945) – Hispaniola
- C. craigae Levi, 1986 – Costa Rica
- C. cuenca Levi, 1986 – Ecuador
- C. decolorata (O. Pickard-Cambridge, 1889) – Guatemala
- C. digua Levi, 1986 – Colombia
- C. distincta (Bryant, 1940) – Cuba
- C. donachui Levi, 1986 – Colombia
- C. duida Levi, 1986 – Venezuela
- C. eberhardi Levi, 1986 – Colombia
- C. ecarup Levi, 1986 – Colombia
- C. eugeni Levi, 1986 – Martinique, St. Vincent
- C. explorans (Chamberlin, 1916) – Peru
- C. fidelia Levi, 1986 – Colombia
- C. flava (O. Pickard-Cambridge, 1894) – Mexico to Brazil
- C. flavicans (Caporiacco, 1947) – Brazil, Guyana, Suriname
- C. fuscolimbata (Archer, 1958) – Jamaica
- C. guadeloupensis Levi, 1986 – Guadeloupe
- C. guttata (Keyserling, 1881) – Colombia, Venezuela, Peru, Brazil
- C. hamata (Bryant, 1942) – Puerto Rico
- C. heredia Levi, 1986 – Costa Rica
- C. huanuco Levi, 1986 – Peru
- C. huila Levi, 1986 – Colombia, Ecuador
- C. incachaca Levi, 1986 – Colombia
- C. itaimba Levi, 1986 – Brazil
- C. jayuyensis (Petrunkevitch, 1930) – Puerto Rico
- C. jelskii Levi, 1986 – Peru
- C. jordao Levi, 1986 – Brazil
- C. keyserlingi Levi, 1986 – Colombia
- C. kochalkai Levi, 1986 – Colombia
- C. lancetilla Levi, 1986 – Honduras
- C. lapazensis Levi, 1986 – Bolivia
- C. lepida (Keyserling, 1881) – Peru
- C. levii Álvarez-Padilla, 2007 – Chile
- C. linguiformis (Franganillo, 1930) – Cuba, Jamaica
- C. lomanhungae Nogueira, Pena-Barbosa, Venticinque & Brescovit, 2011 – Brazil
- C. ludibunda (Keyserling, 1893) – Brazil, Paraguay
- C. luisi Levi, 1986 – Ecuador
- C. machala Levi, 1986 – Ecuador, Peru
- C. macintyrei Levi, 1986 – Ecuador
- C. macuchi Levi, 1986 – Ecuador, Peru
- C. maculata (Bryant, 1945) – Hispaniola
- C. magdalena Levi, 1986 – Colombia
- C. maitae Álvarez-Padilla, 2007 – Chile
- C. malkini Levi, 1986 – Colombia
- C. marta Levi, 1986 – Colombia
- C. merida Levi, 1986 – Venezuela
- C. minuta (Keyserling, 1883) – Brazil
- C. minza Levi, 1986 – Ecuador
- C. monticola (Keyserling, 1883) – Peru
- C. muerte Levi, 1986 – Costa Rica to Colombia
- C. niebla Levi, 1986 – Colombia
- C. nigroventris (Keyserling, 1879) – Colombia or Panama
- C. nigrovittata (Keyserling, 1865) – Colombia, Ecuador
- C. nubigena Nogueira, Pena-Barbosa, Venticinque & Brescovit, 2011 – Brazil
- C. nuboso Levi, 1986 – Costa Rica
- C. nuevagranada Levi, 1986 – Colombia
- C. obscura (Bryant, 1945) – Hispaniola
- C. opulenta (Keyserling, 1881) – Peru, Brazil
- C. otavalo Levi, 1986 – Ecuador
- C. palenque Levi, 1986 – Mexico to Honduras
- C. pecki Levi, 1986 – Jamaica
- C. pena Simó, Álvarez & Laborda, 2016 – Uruguay
- C. penai Levi, 1986 – Ecuador
- C. petrasierwaldae Nogueira, Pena-Barbosa, Venticinque & Brescovit, 2011 – Brazil
- C. pichincha Levi, 1986 – Ecuador
- C. pilimbala Levi, 1986 – Colombia
- C. plana Levi, 1986 – Ecuador
- C. poas Levi, 1986 – Mexico to Panama
- C. puebla Levi, 1986 – Mexico
- C. purace Levi, 1986 – Colombia
- C. puya Salgueiro-Sepúlveda & Álvarez-Padilla, 2018 – Mexico
- C. ramon Levi, 1986 – Peru
- C. raripila (Keyserling, 1893) – Brazil
- C. rincon Levi, 1986 – Mexico
- C. rosarium Salgueiro-Sepúlveda & Álvarez-Padilla, 2018 – Mexico
- C. rubromaculata (Keyserling, 1864) – Colombia or Panama
- C. sabana Levi, 1986 – Hispaniola
- C. saci Nogueira, Pena-Barbosa, Venticinque & Brescovit, 2011 – Brazil
- C. sagicuta Salgueiro-Sepúlveda & Álvarez-Padilla, 2018 – Mexico
- C. saladito Levi, 1986 – Colombia
- C. santosi Nogueira, Pena-Barbosa, Venticinque & Brescovit, 2011 – Brazil
- C. saramacca Levi, 1986 – Venezuela, Peru, Suriname
- C. satulla (Keyserling, 1881) – Peru
- C. satura Levi, 1986 – Costa Rica
- C. schneblei Levi, 1986 – Colombia, Ecuador
- C. serachui Levi, 1986 – Colombia
- C. sevillano Levi, 1986 – Colombia
- C. sicki Levi, 1986 – Brazil
- C. sondo Levi, 1986 – Colombia
- C. sumare Levi, 1986 – Brazil
- C. sztolcmani Levi, 1986 – Peru
- C. tenuipes (Keyserling, 1864) (type) – Colombia
- C. tinajillas Levi, 1986 – Ecuador
- C. triangulosa Salgueiro-Sepúlveda & Álvarez-Padilla, 2018 – Mexico
- C. troya Levi, 1986 – Ecuador
- C. tungurahua Levi, 1986 – Ecuador
- C. uaza Levi, 1986 – Ecuador, Colombia
- C. unicolor (Keyserling, 1881) – Colombia or Panama
- C. universitaria Levi, 1986 – Costa Rica, Panama
- C. ura Levi, 1986 – Ecuador
- C. utcuyacu Levi, 1986 – Peru
- C. valle Levi, 1986 – Colombia
- C. waikoxi Nogueira, Pena-Barbosa, Venticinque & Brescovit, 2011 – Brazil
- C. xamaticpac Salgueiro-Sepúlveda & Álvarez-Padilla, 2018 – Mexico
- C. xavantina Levi, 1986 – Brazil
- C. yanomami Nogueira, Pena-Barbosa, Venticinque & Brescovit, 2011 – Brazil
- C. yotoco Levi, 1986 – Colombia, Venezuela
- C. yungas Levi, 1986 – Bolivia
- C. yunque Levi, 1986 – Puerto Rico
- C. zelotypa (Keyserling, 1883) – Costa Rica to Peru

In synonymy:

- C. alticola (Berland, 1913, T from Meta) = Chrysometa zelotypa (Keyserling, 1883)
- C. ribeiroi (Soares & Camargo, 1955) = Chrysometa guttata (Keyserling, 1881)
- C. superans (O. Pickard-Cambridge, 1896) = Chrysometa alboguttata (O. Pickard-Cambridge, 1889)
- C. uncata (F. O. Pickard-Cambridge, 1903) = Chrysometa brevipes (O. Pickard-Cambridge, 1889)
