= Manota toomasi =

Scientific classification
- Domain: Eukaryota
- Kingdom: Animalia
- Phylum: Arthropoda
- Class: Insecta
- Order: Diptera
- Family: Mycetophilidae
- Genus: Manota
- Species: M. toomasi

Binomial name
- Manota toomasi Hippa & Kurina, 2012

Species of insect

Manota toomasi is a species of flies belonging to the family Mycetophilidae.

The species is named in honor of Estonian entomologist Toomas Tammaru.
