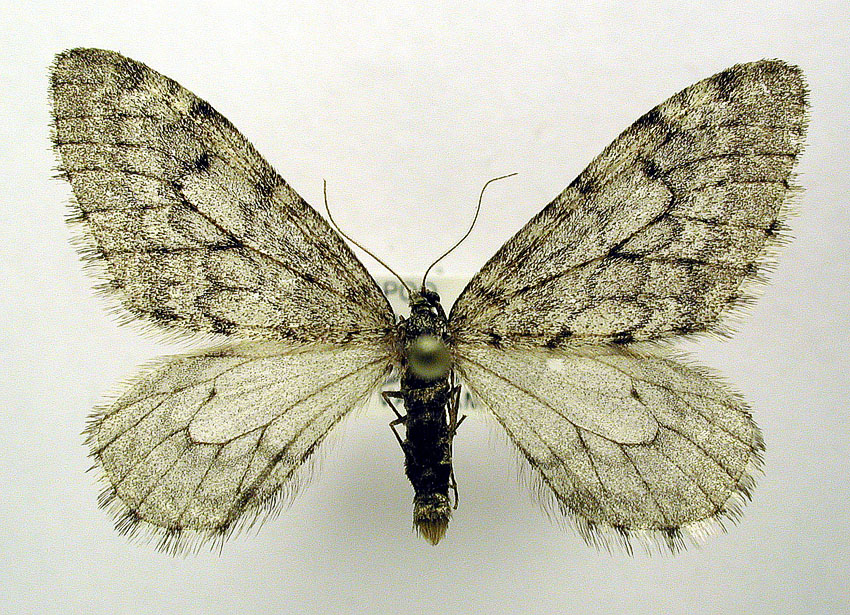
- Male

Scientific classification
- Kingdom: Animalia
- Phylum: Arthropoda
- Class: Insecta
- Order: Lepidoptera
- Family: Geometridae
- Tribe: Operophterini
- Genus: Malacodea; Tengström, 1869
- Species: M. regelaria

Binomial name
- Malacodea regelaria Tengström, 1869

= Malacodea =

Genus of moths

Malacodea is a monotypic genus in the family Geometridae. Its only species, Malacodea regelaria, is found from Fennoscandia and Estonia to northern Siberia. Both the genus and species were first described by Johan Martin Jakob von Tengström in 1869.

The wingspan is 25–31 mm for males. Females are wingless. Adults are on wing from April to May in one generation per year.

The larvae feed on Picea abies. Larvae can be found in July. The species overwinters as a pupa.
