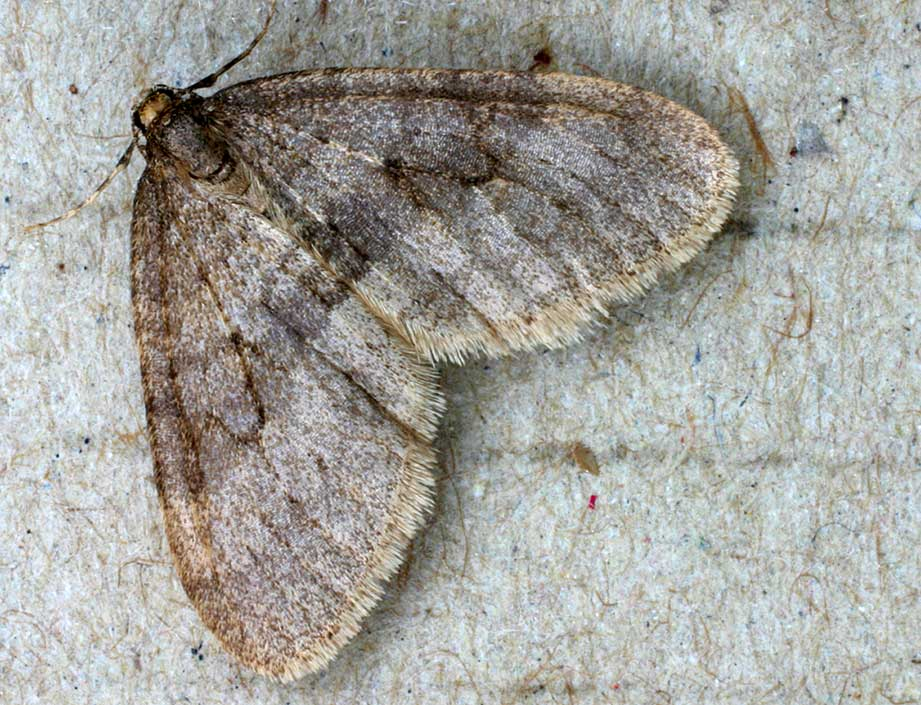
- Winter moth (Operophtera brumata)

Scientific classification
- Domain: Eukaryota
- Kingdom: Animalia
- Phylum: Arthropoda
- Class: Insecta
- Order: Lepidoptera
- Family: Geometridae
- Subfamily: Larentiinae
- Tribe: Operophterini

= Operophterini =

Tribe of moths

Operophterini is a tribe of geometer moths under subfamily Larentiinae.

== Species ==
- Epirrita Hübner, 1822
- Malacodea Tengström, 1869
- Operophtera Hübner, 1825
- Tescalsia Ferguson, 1994
