= Hans Kauri =

Estonian entomologist, zoologist, and politician

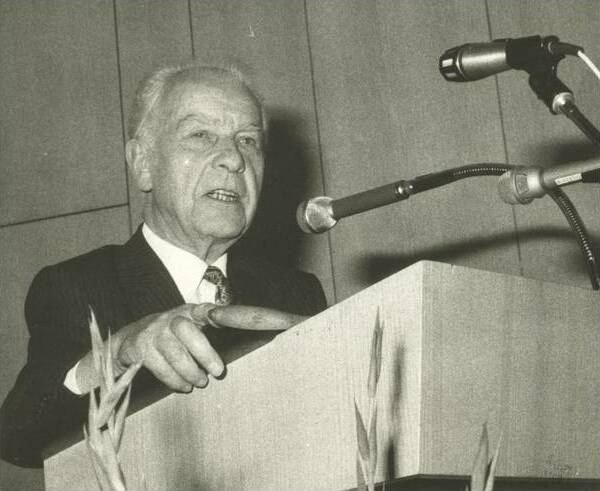
- Born: Hans Mühlberg; May 30, 1906; Puhja, Estonia
- Died: January 30, 1999 (aged 92); Stockholm, Sweden
- Occupation(s): Entomologist, zoologist, politician

Hans Kauri (until 1935, Hans Mühlberg; May 30, 1906 – January 30, 1999) was an Estonian entomologist, zoologist, and politician. He also worked with other groups of fauna, especially arachnids. He had a strong impact on zoological studies at the University of Bergen.

One biographer characterized Kauri as follows: "in all areas he created a professional stimulating environment for both young and older researchers. However, he was a very determined gentleman, who asserted his ideas and opinions with great strength."

== Estonia and Sweden ==
Kauri studied zoology at the University of Tartu in Estonia. He was interested in dragonflies and damselflies (Odonata). During this time he also worked on a manuscript, but it was lost in a fire during the Second World War. His doctoral dissertation on spiders (Arachnoidea) also suffered the same fate. Kauri was forced to flee Estonia during the Soviet occupation of Estonia, and he arrived in Sweden in 1944. There he became an assistant and later a lecturer at the Zoological Institution in Lund. He earned a doctorate on amphibians, although his field of work was horse-flies.

== Bergen Zoological Museum ==
Kauri later relocated to Norway and was employed at the Bergen Zoological Museum in 1963, in a new professorship of zoology, with an emphasis on terrestrial invertebrates. The position included heading the museum, as well as lecturing on classification, faunistics, ecology, and animal geography. The former professorship also covered marine biology.

Kauri had a great impact on the zoological institute at the University of Bergen. The number of students increased significantly. Kauri had an enthusiasm and dedication to work that few could match, and he built a viable institute with classification and ecology as it key elements. He retired in 1976 but remained engaged at the museum for several years after that.

== Hardanger Plateau project ==
The Hardanger Plateau (Norwegian: Hardangervidda) project took place as part of the International Biological Program (IBP) and started in 1969. It dealt with insects and other lower groups of fauna in the high mountains. Kauri became the project's leader in a group of researchers from the University of Bergen. Three research assistants were hired through 1974. A number of publications resulted in the series Fauna of the Hardangervidda, as well as several major theses. This was of great importance for the knowledge about the fauna in the high mountains.

== Arachnids ==
Kauri continued his studies in Norway on horse-flies, daddy longlegs (Opiliones), and spiders. He wrote several publications. In 1985 he worked on material from central Africa, which resulted in 61 new species, 12 new genera, and three new sub-families for science. As late as 1998 he produced an overview of spiders on the Hardanger Plateau, edited by Erling Hauge and Torstein Solhøy.
