= 2022 World Singles Ninepin Bowling Classic Championships – Men's single =

Men's single at the 2022 World Single Ninepin Bowling Classic Championships
- Location: Elva, Estonia
- Dates: 23-24 May 2022 (Qualifying); 26-28 May 2022 (Knock-out phase)
- Competitors: 61 from 15 nations

Medalists
gold medal	Vilmoš Zavarko	Serbia
silver medal	Alen Kujundžić	Croatia
bronze medal	Florian Fritzmann	Germany
bronze medal	Manuel Weiß	Germany

The men's single event at the 2022 World Singles Ninepin Bowling Classic Championships was held in Elva, Estonia. Qualifying took place on 23-24 May, while knock-out phase from 26 May to 28 May 2022.

The defending champion was Serb Vilmoš Zavarko, who won this competition at 2018 World Championships in Cluj-Napoca and successfully defended the title by defeating in the final Croatian Alen Kujundžić.

== Qualifying ==
=== Starting places ===
The starting places have been allocated on the basis of each nation achievements during the previous championships. The first were given on the basis of the places taken by the teams during 2021 World Championships, and the rest in reference to the competition of previous championships taken.

	(Austria) AUT	(Bosnia and Herzegovina) ~~BIH~~	(Croatia) CRO	(Czech Republic) CZE	(Denmark) DEN	(Estonia) EST	(France) FRA	(Germany) GER	(Hungary) HUN	(Italy) ITA	(Poland) POL	(Romania) ROU	(Slovenia) SLO	(Serbia) SRB	(Slovakia) SVK	(Sweden) SWE	Total
Number of seeds	5+1	0	5+1	4+2	1	2	2	6	4+2	1	4	3+1	3+2	6	4+1	1	61

=== Results ===
All players played qualifying game with 120 balls. Best 32 qualified to the knock-out phase.

Rank	Name	Country	All	Clear off	Faults	Total	Notes
1	Alen Kujundžić	Croatia	431	281	0	712	Q
2	Vilmoš Zavarko	Serbia	429	280	0	709	Q
3	Christian Wilke	Germany	413	283	0	696	Q
4	Matthias Zatschkowitsch	Austria	429	250	1	679	Q
5	Norbert Kiss	Hungary	416	258	0	674	Q
6	Martin Janits	Austria	425	248	0	673	Q
7	Hrvoje Marinović	Croatia	418	254	0	672	Q
8	Danijel Lavrič	Slovenia	417	251	2	668	Q
9	Zsombor Zapletán	Hungary	415	248	0	663	Q
10	Čongor Baranj	Serbia	419	242	0	661	Q
11	Florian Fritzmann	Germany	421	239	0	660	Q
12	Rostislav Gorecký	Czech Republic	427	233	1	660	Q
13	Manuel Weiß	Germany	413	246	1	659	Q
14	Bojan Vlakevski	Croatia	424	233	0	657	Q
15	Matej Lepej	Slovenia	404	246	1	650	Q
16	Adrijan Lončarević	Serbia	405	245	0	650	Q
17	Erik Kuna	Slovakia	410	240	0	650	Q
18	Radovan Vlajkov	Serbia	427	223	1	650	Q
19	Daniel Barth	Germany	413	232	1	645	Q
20	Frédéric Koell	France	413	231	0	644	Q
21	Armin Egger	Italy	400	241	1	641	Q
22	Manuel Lallinger	Germany	402	238	0	640	Q
23	Jan Bína	Czech Republic	404	235	1	639	Q
24	Igor Kovačić	Serbia	417	220	0	637	Q
25	Ivan Čech	Slovakia	395	240	0	635	Q
26	Lukas Temistokle	Austria	410	225	1	635	Q
27	Jaroslav Hažva	Czech Republic	393	241	0	634	Q
28	Luka Bolanča	Croatia	401	233	1	634	Q
29	Markus Vsetecka	Austria	392	241	0	633	Q
30	Matija Mance	Croatia	393	240	0	633	Q
31	Jürgen Pointinger	Germany	402	231	0	633	Q
32	Robert Ernješi	Serbia	394	237	1	631	Q
33	Károly Kozma	Hungary	389	240	0	629	
34	Bogdan Dudas Horatiu	Romania	408	221	0	629	
35	Gašper Kragelj	Slovenia	408	221	2	629	
36	Lukáš Juris	Slovakia	411	218	1	629	
37	Blaž Čerin	Slovenia	388	236	0	624	
38	Levente Kakuk	Hungary	413	210	1	623	
39	Lukas Huber	Austria	397	225	0	622	
40	Bartosz Krug	Poland	397	224	1	621	
41	Urmas Lembla	Estonia	410	211	1	621	
42	Cyril Hugele	France	396	221	4	617	
43	Michał Szulc	Poland	400	215	0	615	
44	Peter Nemček	Slovakia	402	213	0	615	
45	Bystrík Vadovič	Slovakia	387	226	2	613	
46	Bogdan Tudorie	Romania	400	213	2	613	
47	Milan Blecha	Czech Republic	410	201	0	611	
48	Zoltán Móricz	Hungary	402	207	0	609	
49	Franci Velišček	Slovenia	399	209	1	608	
50	Ion Cercel	Romania	383	223	2	606	
51	Philipp Vsetecka	Austria	377	228	2	605	
52	Zdeněk Ransdorf	Czech Republic	400	204	4	604	
53	Ivan Totić	Croatia	391	200	2	591	
54	Mateusz Goździk	Poland	399	187	2	586	
55	Karol Sellmann	Poland	408	176	0	584	
56	Petr Dobeš	Czech Republic	388	195	1	583	
57	Martin Folmer Hansen	Denmark	404	167	9	571	
58	Stefan Romeo Balan	Romania	385	185	4	570	
59	János Brancsek	Hungary	393	177	1	570	
60	Juha Sahlman	Sweden	382	185	2	567	
61	Markko Abel	Estonia	386	173	4	559	

== Finals ==
According to the results of the qualification, 32 players were put together in bouts, which took place on standard match rules - 4 sets of 30 throws. The competitor who obtains a larger number of sets wins. With an equal number of sets decides a higher total score.

=== Schedule ===
Round of 32 - Thursday, 26 May

Match #	Lanes	Player 1	Score	Player 2	Set 1	Set 2	Set 3	Set 4
1st unit 11:00 (EEST)
SCM 1	1 – 4	(Croatia) Alen Kujundžić	2 - 2; 682 - 671	(Serbia) Robert Ernješi	150 - 169	164 - 177	174 - 165	194 - 160
SCM 2	1 – 4	(Slovakia) Erik Kuna	3 - 1; 651 - 609	(Serbia) Adrijan Lončarević	176 - 159	147 - 150	165 - 154	163 - 146
2nd unit 12:20 (EEST)
SCM 3	1 – 4	(Hungary) Zsombor Zapletán	3 - 1; 643 - 609	(Serbia) Igor Kovačić	165 - 148	159 - 145	152 - 153	167 - 163
SCM 4	1 – 4	(Slovakia) Ivan Čech	4 - 0; 639 - 584	(Slovenia) Danijel Lavrič	166 - 157	165 - 133	158 - 154	150 - 140
3rd unit 13:40 (EEST)
SCM 5	1 – 4	(Hungary) Norbert Kiss	2 - 2; 631 - 654	(Croatia) Luka Bolanča	165 - 154	172 - 164	149 - 165	145 - 171
SCM 6	1 – 4	(Italy) Armin Egger	3 - 1; 621 - 622	(Czech Republic) Rostislav Gorecký	152 - 150	160 - 147	166 - 156	143 - 169
4th unit 15:00 (EEST)
SCM 7	1 – 4	(Germany) Manuel Weiß	2 - 2; 658 - 644	(France) Frédéric Koell	156 - 160	167 - 155	164 - 173	171 - 156
SCM 8	1 – 4	(Austria) Markus Vsetecka	1 - 3; 615 - 661	(Austria) Matthias Zatschkowitsch	151 - 172	153 - '166	160 - 158	151 - 165
5th unit 16:20 (EEST)
SCM 9	1 – 4	(Germany) Christian Wilke	4 - 0; 664 - 613	(Croatia) Matija Mance	173 - 153	170 - 156	162 - 153	159 - 151
SCM 10	1 – 4	(Germany) Daniel Barth	1 - 3; 642 - 664	(Croatia) Bojan Vlakevski	169 - 164	153 - 168	161 - 171	159 - 161
6th unit 17:40 (EEST)
SCM 11	1 – 4	(Germany) Florian Fritzmann	3 - 1; 661 - 607	(Germany) Manuel Lallinger	160 - 155	180 - 159	153 - 158	168 - 135
SCM 12	1 – 4	(Czech Republic) Jaroslav Hažva	2 - 2; 678 - 651	(Austria) Martin Janits	151 - 157	178 - 165	173 - 177	176 - 152
7th unit 19:00 (EEST)
SCM 13	1 – 4	(Croatia) Hrvoje Marinović	1 - 3; 645 - 668	(Austria) Lukas Temistokle	166 - 181	145 - 147	174 - 171	160 - 169
SCM 14	1 – 4	(Czech Republic) Jan Bína	2 - 2; 646 - 665	(Serbia) Čongor Baranj	162 - 173	167 - 159	153 - 172	164 - 161
8th unit 20:20 (EEST)
SCM 15	1 – 4	(Slovenia) Matej Lepej	2 - 2; 634 - 619	(Serbia) Radovan Vlajkov	160 - 166	141 - 158	169 - 134	164 - 161
SCM 16	1 – 4	(Germany) Jürgen Pointinger	1.5 - 2.5; 656 - 673	(Serbia) Vilmoš Zavarko	167 - 166	170 - 170	166 - 175	153 - 162

Round of 16 - Friday, 27 May

Match #	Lanes	Player 1	Score	Player 2	Set 1	Set 2	Set 3	Set 4
1st unit 10:00 (EEST)
SCM 17	5 – 8	(Croatia) Alen Kujundžić	2 - 2; 675 - 653	(Slovakia) Erik Kuna	155 - 158	178 - 180	173 - 151	169 - 164
SCM 18	5 – 8	(Hungary) Zsombor Zapletán	1 - 3; 609 - 628	(Slovakia) Ivan Čech	144 - 155	156 - 177	159 - 137	150 - 159
2nd unit 11:20 (EEST)
SCM 19	5 – 8	(Croatia) Luka Bolanča	3 - 1; 679 - 613	(Italy) Armin Egger	183 - 165	181 - 140	160 - 145	155 - 163
SCM 20	5 – 8	(Germany) Manuel Weiß	4 - 0; 667 - 638	(Austria) Matthias Zatschkowitsch	171 - 153	167 - 162	169 - 167	160 - 156
3rd unit 12:40 (EEST)
SCM 21	5 – 8	(Germany) Christian Wilke	3 - 1; 708 - 677	(Croatia) Bojan Vlakevski	175 - 143	181 - 176	178 - 187	174 - 171
SCM 22	5 – 8	(Germany) Florian Fritzmann	3 - 1; 637 - 642	(Czech Republic) Jaroslav Hažva	161 - 184	154 - 153	164 - 153	158 - 152
4th unit 14:00 (EEST)
SCM 23	5 – 8	(Austria) Lukas Temistokle	2 - 2; 682 - 671	(Serbia) Čongor Baranj	174 - 176	137 - 166	167 - 163	154 - 159
SCM 24	5 – 8	(Slovenia) Matej Lepej	0 - 4; 644 - 694	(Serbia) Vilmoš Zavarko	158 - 177	160 - 170	168 - 178	158 - 169

Quarterfinals - Friday, 27 May

Match #	Lanes	Player 1	Score	Player 2	Set 1	Set 2	Set 3	Set 4
1st unit 15:30 (EEST)
SCM 25	1 – 4	(Croatia) Alen Kujundžić	2 - 2; 643 - 615	(Slovakia) Ivan Čech	157 - 172	144 - 155	165 - 150	177 - 138
SCM 26	1 – 4	(Croatia) Luka Bolanča	2 - 2; 624 - 642	(Germany) Manuel Weiß	161 - 168	149 - 173	163 - 151	151 - 150
2nd unit 16:50 (EEST)
SCM 27	1 – 48	(Germany) Christian Wilke	1.5 - 2.5; 679 - 714	(Germany) Fritzmann Florian	170 - 191	171 - 171	175 - 171	163 - 181
SCM 28	1 – 4	(Serbia) Čongor Baranj	0 - 4; 629 - 701	(Serbia) Vilmoš Zavarko	166 - 180	157 - 159	156 - 172	150 - 190

Semifinals - Saturday, 28 May

Match #	Lanes	Player 1	Score	Player 2	Set 1	Set 2	Set 3	Set 4
10:00 (EEST)
SCM 29	5 – 8	(Croatia) Alen Kujundžić	2 - 2; 638 - 637	(Germany) Manuel Weiß	154 - 149	156 - 167	149 - 164	179 - 157
SCM 30	5 – 8	(Germany) Florian Fritzmann	2 - 2; 683 - 690	(Serbia) Vilmoš Zavarko	170 - 151	161 - 202	172 - 156	180 - 181

Final - Saturday, 28 May

Match #	Lanes	Player 1	Score	Player 2	Set 1	Set 2	Set 3	Set 4
11:30 (EEST)
SCM 31	3 – 6	(Croatia) Alen Kujundžić	1 - 3; 646 - 685	(Serbia) Vilmoš Zavarko	162 - 166	165 - 175	149 - 184	170 - 160

=== Bracket ===
Round of 32; 26 May
1	(Croatia) Alen Kujundžić	2	664
32	(Serbia) Robert Ernješi	2	613
17	(Slovakia) Erik Kuna	3	651
16	(Serbia) Adrijan Lončarević	1	609
9	(Hungary) Zsombor Zapletán	3	643
24	(Serbia) Igor Kovačić	1	609
25	(Slovakia) Ivan Čech	4	639
8	(Slovenia) Danijel Lavrič	0	584
5	(Hungary) Norbert Kiss	2	631
28	(Croatia) Luka Bolanča	2	654
21	(Italy) Armin Egger	3	621
12	(Czech Republic) Rostislav Gorecký	1	622
13	(Germany) Manuel Weiß	2	658
20	(France) Frédéric Koell	2	644
29	(Austria) Markus Vsetecka	1	615
4	(Austria) Matthias Zatschkowitsch	3	661
3	(Germany) Christian Wilke	4	664
30	(Croatia) Matija Mance	0	613
19	(Germany) Daniel Barth	1	642
14	(Croatia) Bojan Vlakevski	3	664
11	(Germany) Florian Fritzmann	3	661
22	(Germany) Manuel Lallinger	1	607
27	(Czech Republic) Jaroslav Hažva	2	678
6	(Austria) Martin Janits	2	651
7	(Croatia) Hrvoje Marinović	1	645
26	(Austria) Lukas Temistokle	3	668
23	(Czech Republic) Jan Bína	2	646
10	(Serbia) Čongor Baranj	2	665
15	(Slovenia) Matej Lepej	2	634
18	(Serbia) Radovan Vlajkov	2	619
31	(Germany) Jürgen Pointinger	1.5	656
2	(Serbia) Vilmoš Zavarko	2.5	674

Round of 16; 27 May
(Croatia) Alen Kujundžić	2	675
(Slovakia) Erik Kuna	2	653
(Hungary) Zsombor Zapletán	1	609
(Slovakia) Ivan Čech	3	628
(Croatia) Luka Bolanča	3	679
(Italy) Armin Egger	1	613
(Germany) Manuel Weiß	4	667
(Austria) Matthias Zatschkowitsch	0	638
(Germany) Christian Wilke	3	708
(Croatia) Bojan Vlakevski	1	677
(Germany) Florian Fritzmann	3	637
(Czech Republic) Jaroslav Hažva	1	642
(Austria) Lukas Temistokle	1	632
(Serbia) Čongor Baranj	3	664
(Slovenia) Matej Lepej	0	644
(Serbia) Vilmoš Zavarko	4	694

Quarterfinals; 27 May
(Croatia) Alen Kujundžić	2	643
(Slovakia) Ivan Čech	2	615
(Croatia) Luka Bolanča	2	624
(Germany) Manuel Weiß	2	642
(Germany) Christian Wilke	1.5	679
(Germany) Florian Fritzmann	2.5	714
(Serbia) Čongor Baranj	0	629
(Serbia) Vilmoš Zavarko	4	701

Semifinals; 28 May
(Croatia) Alen Kujundžić	2	638
(Germany) Manuel Weiß	2	637
(Germany) Florian Fritzmann	1	683
(Serbia) Vilmoš Zavarko	3	690

Final; 28 May
(Croatia) Alen Kujundžić	1	646
(Serbia) Vilmoš Zavarko	3	685
