= 2021 World Team Ninepin Bowling Classic Championships – Men's tournament =

Tournament details
- Host country: Poland
- City: Tarnowo Podgórne
- Venue: 1 (in 1 host city)
- Dates: 23–30 Oct
- Teams: 14

Final positions
- Champions: Serbia (6th title)
- Runners-up: Germany
- Third place: Croatia
- Fourth place: Austria

Tournament statistics
- Matches played: 26
- Top scorers: Player: Čongor Baranj 738; Team: Serbia 4140

The men's tournament at the 2021 World Team Ninepin Bowling Classic Championships was held in Tarnowo Podgórne, Poland, from 23 to 30 October 2021.

Serbia defended and captured their sixth title by defeating Germans 5-3 in the final match. Bronze was secured by Croatia who beat Austria 6–2.

== Participating teams ==
14 associations applied to participate in the men's teams competition.

- Austria
- Bosnia and Herzegovina
- Croatia
- Czech Republic
- Estonia
- France
- Germany
- Hungary
- North Macedonia
- Poland
- Romania
- Serbia
- Slovakia
- Slovenia

=== Draw ===
Groups were drawn on August 27, 2021 during the technical briefing in Kranj.

Pot 1	Pot 2	Pot 3
Croatia; Germany; Hungary; Serbia	Austria; Czech Republic; Slovakia; Slovenia	Bosnia and Herzegovina; Estonia; France; North Macedonia; Poland (hosts); Romania

=== Groups ===
Group A	Group B	Group C	Group D
Croatia; Czech Republic; France; Romania	Germany; Austria; Bosnia and Herzegovina; Estonia	Serbia; Slovakia; North Macedonia	Hungary; Slovenia; Poland (hosts)

== Group stage ==
=== Group A ===
		Pts	Matches			Team points		Set points		Qualification
Rank	Team	Pts	W	D	L	W	L	W	L	Qualification
1	Croatia	6	3	0	0	21	3	49.5	22.5	Advance to quarterfinals
2	Czech Republic	4	2	0	1	17	7	43.5	28.5	Advance to quarterfinals
3	Romania	2	1	0	2	7	17	30	42	
4	France	0	0	0	3	3	21	21	51	

23 Oct 2021
11:00 CEST

Czech Republic	8 - 0	France
3822 19.0	Report	5.0 3546
Jan Bína 648 2.0		2.0 626 Julien Schmitt
Jan Mecerod 589 3.0		1.0 567 Corentin Rauscher
Rostislav Gorecký 630 4.0		0.0 569 Georges Ungurean
Petr Hendrych 647 3.0		1.0 581 Guillaume Changenet
( (substituted on) 61 Michal Pytlík) Milan Svoboda 669 4.0		0.0 584 Anthony Rabier
( (substituted on) 61 Jan Endršt) Jaroslav Hažva 639 3.0		1.0 619 Frédéric Koell

ZST Hall, Tarnowo Podgórne
Head referee: Mitja Hudovernik

24 Oct 2021
11:30 CEST

Croatia	7 - 1	Romania
3948 14.5	Report	9.5 3687
Branko Manev 648 0.0		4.0 666 Bogdan Dudas Horatiu
Alen Kujundžić 710 3.0		1.0 658 Bogdan Tudorie
Matija Mance 630 2.0		2.0 587 Vlad-George Sabau
Bojan Vlakevski 653 2.0		2.0 637 Ion Cercel
Luka Bolanča 675 4.0		0.0 596 Petrut Ovidiu Mihalcioiu ( (substituted on) 61 Stefan Romeo Balan)
Hrvoje Marinović 632 3.5		0.5 543 Florin Opinca ( (substituted on) 59 Catalin-Remus Antimirescu)

ZST Hall, Tarnowo Podgórne
Head referee: Mitja Hudovernik

25 Oct 2021
08:00 CEST

Czech Republic	7 - 1	Romania
3953 16.0	Report	8.0 3800
Milan Svoboda 661 2.5		1.5 643 Bogdan Dudas Horatiu
Michal Pytlík 684 3.0		1.0 685 Ion Cercel
Rostislav Gorecký 632 4.0		0.0 567 Florin Opinca
Petr Hendrych 634 0.5		3.5 659 Bogdan Tudorie
Jan Bína 677 3.0		1.0 610 Vlad-George Sabau
Jaroslav Hažva 665 3.0		1.0 636 Petrut Ovidiu Mihalcioiu

ZST Hall, Tarnowo Podgórne
Head referee: Mitja Hudovernik

25 Oct 2021
18:30 CEST

France	0 - 8	Croatia
3628 4.5	Report	19.5 3890
Julien Schmitt 622 0.5		3.5 687 Hrvoje Marinović
Cyril Hugele 603 1.0		3.0 655 Mihael Grivičić
Guillaume Changenet 598 0.0		4.0 631 Alen Kujundžić
Corentin Rauscher 597 0.5		3.5 664 Nikola Muše
Frédéric Koell 644 1.5		2.5 654 Bojan Vlakevski
Anthony Rabier 570 1.0		3.0 599 Ivan Totić

ZST Hall, Tarnowo Podgórne
Head referee: Mitja Hudovernik

26 Oct 2021
18:30 CEST

France	3 - 5	Romania
3650 11.5	Report	12.5 3729
Julien Schmitt 605 1.0		3.0 644 Bogdan Dudas Horatiu
Georges Ungurean 560 0.0		4.0 661 Ion Cercel
Cyril Hugele 626 3.5		0.5 574 Stefan Romeo Balan
Corentin Rauscher 634 2.0		2.0 611 Bogdan Tudorie
Guillaume Changenet 561 1.0		3.0 609 Vlad-George Sabau
Frédéric Koell 664 4.0		0.0 630 Petrut Ovidiu Mihalcioiu

ZST Hall, Tarnowo Podgórne
Head referee: Mitja Hudovernik

27 Oct 2021
11:30 CEST

Croatia	6 - 2	Czech Republic
3928 15.5	Report	8.5 3786
Hrvoje Marinović 681 4.0		0.0 603 Milan Svoboda ( (substituted on) 61 Jan Endršt)
Alen Kujundžić 601 0.5		3.5 622 Michal Pytlík
Matija Mance 648 2.0		2.0 661 Rostislav Gorecký
Branko Manev 654 3.0		1.0 624 Petr Hendrych
Luka Bolanča 677 4.0		0.0 618 Jan Bína ( (substituted on) 91 Jan Mecerod)
Bojan Vlakevski 667 2.0		2.0 658 Jaroslav Hažva

ZST Hall, Tarnowo Podgórne
Head referee: Mitja Hudovernik

=== Group B ===
		Pts	Matches			Team points		Set points		Qualification
Rank	Team	Pts	W	D	L	W	L	W	L	Qualification
1	Germany	6	3	0	0	22	2	56	16	Advance to quarterfinals
2	Austria	4	2	0	1	15	9	37	35	Advance to quarterfinals
3	Bosnia and Herzegovina	2	1	0	2	9	15	35	37	
4	Estonia	0	0	0	3	2	22	16	56	

23 Oct 2021
14:30 CEST

Austria	7 - 1	Bosnia and Herzegovina
3829 15.0	Report	9.0 3771
Martin Rathmayer 619 2.0		2.0 617 Dragan Šukalo
Christoph Essmeister 604 3.0		1.0 599 Ivan Petrić
Markus Vsetecka 646 3.0		1.0 622 Darko Lotina
Lukas Temistokle 664 3.0		1.0 652 Nermin Hrustemović
Matthias Zatschkowitsch 667 2.0		2.0 637 Nemanja Galić
Martin Janits 629 2.0		2.0 644 Pere Petrić

ZST Hall, Tarnowo Podgórne
Head referee: Mitja Hudovernik

24 Oct 2021
08:00 CEST

Germany	8 - 0	Estonia
3992 21.5	Report	2.5 3491
Manuel Weiß 643 2.0		2.0 621 Markko Abel
Christian Wilke 711 4.0		0.0 588 Urmas Lembla
Florian Fritzmann 694 4.0		0.0 574 Kaido Kirs
Daniel Schmid 644 4.0		0.0 566 Kristjan Tamlak
Jürgen Pointinger 619 3.5		0.5 583 Runnar Lindepuu
Timo Hoffmann 681 4.0		0.0 559 Marek Sööt

ZST Hall, Tarnowo Podgórne
Head referee: Mitja Hudovernik

25 Oct 2021
11:30 CEST

Austria	6 - 2	Estonia
3623 14.0	Report	10.0 3504
Martin Rathmayer 627 1.5		2.5 629 Markko Abel
( (substituted on) 61 Lukas Temistokle) Markus Vsetecka 630 3.0		1.0 579 Marko Muts
Alexander Tischler 587 3.0		1.0 556 Runnar Lindepuu
( (substituted on) 61 Matthias Zatschkowitsch) Jürgen Ertl 579 0.5		3.5 592 Gert Piksar
Christoph Essmeister 598 3.0		1.0 591 Urmas Lembla
Martin Janits 602 3.0		1.0 557 Kristjan Tamlak

ZST Hall, Tarnowo Podgórne
Head referee: Mitja Hudovernik

25 Oct 2021
15:00 CEST

Bosnia and Herzegovina	0 - 8	Germany
3704 5.5	Report	18.5 3976
Ivan Petrić 668 2.0		2.0 677 Tim Brachtel
Nermin Kasumović 636 2.0		2.0 644 Florian Fritzmann
Miodrag Trklja 622 0.5		3.5 660 Christian Wilke
( (substituted on) 61 Nemanja Galić) Nermin Hrustemović 554 0.0		4.0 651 Manuel Weiß
Darko Lotina 584 0.0		4.0 671 Timo Hoffmann ( (substituted on) 61 Manuel Lallinger)
( (substituted on) 61 Dragan Šukalo) Pere Petrić 640 1.0		3.0 673 Jürgen Pointinger

ZST Hall, Tarnowo Podgórne
Head referee: Mitja Hudovernik

26 Oct 2021
08:00 CEST

Bosnia and Herzegovina	8 - 0	Estonia
3745 20.5	Report	3.5 3417
Ivan Petrić 660 4.0		0.0 576 Marko Muts
( (substituted on) 61 Darko Lotina) Nermin Kasumović 574 2.0		2.0 571 Markko Abel
Nermin Hrustemović 627 2.5		1.5 581 Kaido Kirs
Miodrag Trklja 623 4.0		0.0 577 Urmas Lembla
Dragan Šukalo 625 4.0		0.0 543 Gert Piksar
Pere Petrić 636 4.0		0.0 569 Marek Sööt

ZST Hall, Tarnowo Podgórne
Head referee: Mitja Hudovernik

27 Oct 2021
18:30 CEST

Germany	6 - 2	Austria
3993 16.0	Report	8.0 3757
Tim Brachtel 647 3.0		1.0 608 Christoph Essmeister
Christian Wilke 716 4.0		0.0 629 Martin Rathmayer
Florian Fritzmann 656 4.0		0.0 615 Alexander Tischler
Manuel Weiß 646 1.0		3.0 667 Lukas Temistokle
Jürgen Pointinger 634 3.0		1.0 562 Jürgen Ertl
Timo Hoffmann 694 1.0		3.0 676 Matthias Zatschkowitsch

ZST Hall, Tarnowo Podgórne
Head referee: Mitja Hudovernik

=== Group C ===
		Pts	Matches			Team points		Set points		Qualification
Rank	Team	Pts	W	D	L	W	L	W	L	Qualification
1	Serbia	4	2	0	0	15	1	39	9	Advance to quarterfinals
2	Slovakia	2	1	0	1	7	9	19	29	Advance to quarterfinals
3	North Macedonia	0	0	0	2	2	14	14	34	

24 Oct 2021
15:00 CEST

Slovakia	7 - 1	North Macedonia
3803 15.0	Report	9.0 3724
Marcel Ivančík 652 2.0		2.0 645 Sašo Trpkovski
Maroš Ležovič 642 3.0		1.0 612 Darko Dimitrovski
Peter Nemček 636 3.0		1.0 621 Ibrahim Memedi
Erik Kuna 645 3.0		1.0 603 Boris Benedik
Boris Šintál 626 2.0		2.0 624 Damir Fučkar
Milan Tomka 602 2.0		2.0 619 Dimitar Dimitrovski

ZST Hall, Tarnowo Podgórne
Head referee: Mitja Hudovernik

26 Oct 2021
11:30 CEST

North Macedonia	1 - 7	Serbia
3674 5.0	Report	19.0 3922
Ibrahim Memedi 619 3.0		1.0 605 Daniel Tepša
Duško Ajdin 572 1.0		4.0 663 Vilmoš Zavarko
Sašo Trpkovski 630 1.0		3.0 674 Robert Ernješi
Damir Fučkar 640 1.0		3.0 652 Igor Kovačić
Boris Benedik 596 0.0		4.0 636 Radovan Vlajkov ( (substituted on) 61 Bojan Kličarić)
Dimitar Dimitrovski 617 0.0		4.0 692 Čongor Baranj ( (substituted on) 61 Aleksandar Milinković)

ZST Hall, Tarnowo Podgórne
Head referee: Mitja Hudovernik

27 Oct 2021
08:00 CEST

Serbia	8 - 0	Slovakia
4140 20.0	Report	4.0 3740
Robert Ernješi 672 4.0		0.0 584 Maroš Ležovič ( (substituted on) 61 Ivan Čech)
Igor Kovačić 719 2.0		2.0 685 Lukáš Juris
Vilmoš Zavarko 670 4.0		0.0 582 Radoslav Fúska
Radovan Vlajkov 669 3.0		1.0 639 Erik Kuna ( (substituted on) 61 Milan Tomka)
Čongor Baranj 738 4.0		0.0 615 Marcel Ivančík
Adrijan Lončarević 672 3.0		1.0 635 Peter Nemček

ZST Hall, Tarnowo Podgórne
Head referee: Mitja Hudovernik

=== Group D ===
		Pts	Matches			Team points		Set points		Qualification
Rank	Team	Pts	W	D	L	W	L	W	L	Qualification
1	Hungary	4	2	0	0	12	4	27	21	Advance to quarterfinals
2	Poland (H)	2	1	0	1	9	7	24.5	23.5	Advance to quarterfinals
3	Slovenia	0	0	0	2	3	13	20.5	27.5	

24 Oct 2021
18:30 CEST

Slovenia	2 - 6	Poland
3734 11.5	Report	12.5 3815
Franci Velišček 642 2.0		2.0 645 Mikołaj Konopka
Gašper Kragelj 622 2.5		1.5 632 Jakub Osiewicz
Uroš Stoklas 617 3.0		1.0 611 Bartosz Krug ( (substituted on) 31 Mateusz Goździk)
Denis Pašič 612 2.0		2.0 617 Jarosław Bonk
Matej Lepej 627 2.0		2.0 639 Michał Grędziak
Blaž Čerin 614 0.0		4.0 671 Michał Szulc

ZST Hall, Tarnowo Podgórne
Head referee: Mitja Hudovernik

26 Oct 2021
15:00 CEST

Poland	3 - 5	Hungary
3874 12.0	Report	12.0 3924
Mikołaj Konopka 654 3.0		1.0 648 Levente Kakuk
Jakub Osiewicz 666 2.0		2.0 686 Norbert Kiss
Mateusz Goździk 630 1.0		3.0 668 Zsombor Zapletán
Tomasz Masłowski 614 2.0		2.0 612 János Brancsek ( (substituted on) 61 Zoltán Horváth)
Michał Grędziak 675 1.0		3.0 696 Tamás Kiss
Michał Szulc 635 3.0		1.0 614 Ádám Farkas

ZST Hall, Tarnowo Podgórne
Head referee: Mitja Hudovernik

27 Oct 2021
15:00 CEST

Hungary	7 - 1	Slovenia
3864 15.0	Report	9.0 3774
Zoltán Móricz 668 2.0		2.0 646 Franci Velišček
Norbert Kiss 660 3.0		1.0 625 Gašper Kragelj
Ádám Farkas 630 3.0		1.0 609 Matej Lepej
Zsombor Zapletán 662 4.0		0.0 598 Blaž Čerin ( (substituted on) 61 Danijel Lavrič)
( (substituted on) 31 Zoltán Horváth) Tamás Kiss 604 1.0		3.0 664 Denis Pašić
( (substituted on) 31 János Brancsek) Levente Kakuk 640 2.0		2.0 632 Uroš Stoklas ( (substituted on) 61 Timi Jurančič)

ZST Hall, Tarnowo Podgórne
Head referee: Mitja Hudovernik

== Final Round ==
=== Bracket ===
Quarterfinals
1A	Croatia	8
2C	Slovakia	0
1B	Germany	8
2D	Poland	0
1C	Serbia	6
2A	Czech Republic	2
1D	Hungary	2
2B	Austria	6

Semifinals
Croatia	3
Germany	5
Serbia	5
Austria	3

Final
Germany	3
Serbia	5
Third place
Croatia	6
Austria	2

=== Quarterfinals ===
28 Oct 2021
08:00 CEST

Croatia	8 - 0	Slovakia
3862 17.5	Report	6.5 3653
Bojan Vlakevski 642 4.0		0.0 548 Marcel Ivančík ( (substituted on) 61 Milan Tomka)
Alen Kujundžić 661 3.0		1.0 652 Lukáš Juris
Mihael Grivičić 648 3.0		1.0 642 Erik Kuna
Hrvoje Marinović 643 2.5		1.5 616 Peter Nemček
Ivan Totić 649 3.0		1.0 609 Ivan Čech
Nikola Muše 619 2.0		2.0 586 Boris Šintál ( (substituted on) 61 Maroš Ležovič)

ZST Hall, Tarnowo Podgórne
Head referee: Mitja Hudovernik

28 Oct 2021
11:30 CEST

Germany	8 - 0	Poland
3955 18.5	Report	5.5 3621
Christian Wilke 645 3.5		0.5 575 Jakub Osiewicz ( (substituted on) 61 Jarosław Bonk)
Tim Brachtel 701 3.0		1.0 587 Michał Szulc
Dominik Kunze 652 4.0		0.0 590 Mateusz Klecha
Florian Fritzmann 638 3.0		1.0 611 Mikołaj Konopka
Timo Hoffmann 663 3.0		1.0 605 Mateusz Goździk
( (substituted on) 61 Daniel Schmid) Jürgen Pointinger 656 2.0		2.0 653 Michał Grędziak

ZST Hall, Tarnowo Podgórne
Head referee: Mitja Hudovernik

28 Oct 2021
15:00 CEST

Serbia	6 - 2	Czech Republic
3892 18.0	Report	6.0 3737
Robert Ernješi 653 4.0		0.0 623 Jan Bína
Igor Kovačić 708 4.0		0.0 607 Michal Pytlík
Vilmoš Zavarko 676 4.0		0.0 622 Rostislav Gorecký
Adrijan Lončarević 644 3.0		1.0 623 Jan Endršt
Aleksandar Milinković 585 2.0		2.0 595 Jan Mecerod
Daniel Tepša 626 1.0		3.0 667 Jaroslav Hažva

ZST Hall, Tarnowo Podgórne
Head referee: Mitja Hudovernik

28 Oct 2021
18:30 CEST

Hungary	2 - 6	Austria
3771 9.0	Report	15.0 3828
Zoltán Móricz 601 2.0		2.0 616 Martin Rathmayer
Norbert Kiss 649 2.0		2.0 633 Martin Janits
János Brancsek 616 1.0		3.0 645 Markus Vsetecka
Zsombor Zapletán 638 2.0		2.0 656 Lukas Temistokle
Tamás Kiss 588 2.0		2.0 570 Christoph Eßmeister
Levente Kakuk 679 0.0		4.0 708 Matthias Zatschkowitsch

ZST Hall, Tarnowo Podgórne
Head referee: Mitja Hudovernik

=== Semifinals ===
29 Oct 2021
12:00 CEST

Croatia	3 - 5	Germany
3890 10.5	Report	13.5 3952
Alen Kujundžić 698 3.0		1.0 684 Tim Brachtel
Branko Manev 605 0.0		4.0 659 Christian Wilke
Matija Mance 637 2.5		1.5 617 Dominik Kunze ( (substituted on) 61 Manuel Weiß)
Bojan Vlakevski 636 2.0		2.0 648 Florian Fritzmann
Luka Bolanča 647 1.0		3.0 685 Timo Hoffmann
Ivan Totić 667 2.0		2.0 659 Jürgen Pointinger

ZST Hall, Tarnowo Podgórne
Head referee: Mitja Hudovernik

29 Oct 2021
16:00 CEST

Serbia	5 - 3	Austria
3951 13.0	Report	11.0 3893
Igor Kovačić 680 3.0		1.0 654 Martin Rathmayer
Robert Ernješi 678 2.0		2.0 633 Martin Janits
Radovan Vlajkov 616 1.0		3.0 674 Markus Vsetecka
Vilmoš Zavarko 660 1.0		3.0 673 Lukas Temistokle
Adrijan Lončarević 663 4.0		0.0 585 Alexander Tischler ( (substituted on) 61 Jürgen Ertl)
( (substituted on) 116 Bojan Kličarić) Čongor Baranj 654 2.0		2.0 674 Mattias Zatschkowitsch

ZST Hall, Tarnowo Podgórne
Head referee: Mitja Hudovernik

=== Third place game ===
30 Oct 2021
10:00 CEST

Croatia	6 - 2	Austria
3925 11.0	Report	13.0 3850
Alen Kujundžić 675 3.0		1.0 656 Martin Rathmayer
Bojan Vlakevski 656 2.0		2.0 634 Martin Janits
( (substituted on) 61 Mihael Grivičić) Matija Mance 636 1.0		3.0 645 Markus Vsetecka
Ivan Totić 623 0.0		4.0 672 Lukas Temistokle
Luka Bolanča 663 3.0		1.0 573 Christoph Eßmeister
Branko Manev 672 2.0		2.0 670 Matthias Zatschkowitsch

ZST Hall, Tarnowo Podgórne
Head referee: Mitja Hudovernik

=== Final ===
30 Oct 2021
16:30 CEST

Germany	3 - 5	Serbia
3918 10.0	Report	14.0 3981
Christian Wilke 664 3.0		1.0 652 Igor Kovačić
Florian Fritzmann 698 2.0		2.0 681 Vilmoš Zavarko
Tim Brachtel 638 0.0		4.0 712 Robert Ernješi
Manuel Lallinger 656 2.0		2.0 647 Čongor Baranj
Jürgen Pointinger 639 2.0		2.0 640 Radovan Vlajkov
Timo Hoffmann 623 1.0		3.0 649 Adrijan Lončarević

ZST Hall, Tarnowo Podgórne
Head referee: Mitja Hudovernik

== Final standing ==
Rank	Team
1st place, gold medalist(s)	Serbia
2nd place, silver medalist(s)	Germany
3rd place, bronze medalist(s)	Croatia
4	Austria
5-8	Czech Republic
5-8	Hungary
5-8	Poland
5-8	Slovakia
9-12	Bosnia and Herzegovina
9-12	North Macedonia
9-12	Romania
9-12	Slovenia
13-14	Estonia
13-14	France

2021 Men's World Champions

Serbia
6th title

Team roster: Čongor Baranj, Robert Ernješi, Bojan Kličarić, Igor Kovačić, Adrijan Lončarević, Aleksandar Milinković, Daniel Tepša, Radovan Vlajkov, Vilmoš Zavarko
Head coach: Vojko Pavlović
