= 2022 World Singles Ninepin Bowling Classic Championships – Men's sprint =

Men's sprint at the 2022 World Singles Ninepin Bowling Classic Championships
- Location: Elva, Estonia
- Dates: 25 May 2022
- Competitors: 32 from 15 nations

Medalists
gold medal	Matthias Zatschkowitsch	Austria
silver medal	Zsombor Zapletán	Hungary
bronze medal	Frédéric Koell	France
bronze medal	Bogdan Horatiu Dudas	Romania

The men's sprint event at the 2022 World Singles Ninepin Bowling Classic Championships was held in Elva, Estonia on 25 May 2022.

Gold medal was won by Austrian Matthias Zatschkowitsch, who defeated Hungarian Zsombor Zapletán in the final. Bronze medals went to semi-finalists Frenchman Frédéric Koell and Romanian Bogdan Horatiu Dudas.

== Results ==
=== Starting places ===
The starting places have been allocated on the basis of each nation achievements during the previous championships.

	(Austria) AUT	(Bosnia and Herzegovina) ~~BIH~~	(Croatia) CRO	(Czech Republic) CZE	(Denmark) DEN	(Estonia) EST	(France) FRA	(Germany) GER	(Hungary) HUN	(Italy) ITA	(Poland) POL	(Romania) ROU	(Serbia) SRB	(Slovakia) SVK	(Slovenia) SLO	(Sweden) SWE	Total
Number of seeds	1+2	0	1+2	1+1	1	1	1+1	1+2	1+1	1+1	1+2	1+2	1+2	1	1+1	1	32

=== Schedule ===
The players were drawn into bouts with the reservation that competitors from the same country can not play in the first round against each other.

Round of 32 - Wednesday, 25 May

Match #	Lanes	Player 1	Score	Player 2	Set 1	Set 2	SV
1st unit 11:20 (EEST)
SPM 1	1 – 2	(Italy) Armin Egger	1 – 1	(Serbia) Robert Ernješi	98 – 107	128 - 117	21 – 19
SPM 2	3 – 4	(Denmark) Martin Folmer Hansen	0 – 2	(France) Frédéric Koell	107 – 117	119 – 119	—N/a
SPM 3	5 – 6	(Austria) Lukas Temistokle	1 – 1	(Germany) Christian Wilke	99 – 114	122 – 118	19 – 20
SPM 4	7 – 8	(Poland) Mateusz Goździk	1 – 1	(Germany) Florian Fritzmann	95 – 116	108 – 106	23 – 21
2nd unit 11:55 (EEST)
SPM 5	1 – 2	(Slovenia) Danijel Lavrič	0 – 2	(Serbia) Igor Kovačić	102 – 129	103 – 111	—N/a
SPM 6	3 – 4	(Poland) Michał Szulc	1 – 1	(Slovenia) Matej Lepej	107 – 116	108 – 106	23 – 21
SPM 7	5 – 6	(Germany) Manuel Weiß	1 – 1	(Hungary) Zsombor Zapletán	107 – 106	105 – 108	17 – 18
SPM 8	7 – 8	(Romania) Bogdan Tudorie	2 – 0	(Sweden) Juha Sahlman	124 – 90	93 – 86	—N/a
3rd unit 12:30 (EEST)
SPM 9	1 – 2	(France) Cyril Hugele	1 – 1	(Croatia) Alen Kujundžić	102 – 129	103 – 111	23 – 21
SPM 10	3 – 4	(Hungary) Norbert Kiss	0 – 2	(Serbia) Vilmoš Zavarko	110 – 116	112 – 123	—N/a
SPM 11	5 – 6	(Romania) Ion Cercel	2 – 0	(Estonia) Urmas Lembla	120 – 108	107 – 98	—N/a
SPM 12	7 – 8	(Italy) Aaron Peer Pratzer	0 – 2	(Austria) Matthias Zatschkowitsch	96 – 112	97 – 105	—N/a
4th unit 13:05 (EEST)
SPM 13	1 – 2	(Romania) Bogdan Dudas Horatiu	2 – 0	(Slovakia) Erik Kuna	113 – 110	99 – 96	—N/a
SPM 14	3 – 4	(Austria) Martin Janits	1 – 1	(Czech Republic) Jan Bína	115 – 105	117 – 129	16 – 20
SPM 15	5 – 6	(Croatia) Bojan Vlakevski	2 – 0	(Poland) Bartosz Krug	108 – 98	111 – 94	—N/a
SPM 16	7 – 8	(Czech Republic) Rostislav Gorecký	2 – 0	(Croatia) Hrvoje Marinović	111 – 104	116 – 110	—N/a

Round of 16 - Wednesday, 25 May

Match #	Lanes	Player 1	Score	Player 2	Set 1	Set 2	SV
1st unit 18:40 (EEST)
SPM 18	1 – 2	(Germany) Christian Wilke	1 – 1	(Poland) Mateusz Goździk	111^{6} – 111^{9}	125 – 100	23 – 19
SPM 20	3 – 4	(Hungary) Zsombor Zapletán	2 – 0	(Romania) Bogdan Tudorie	118 – 105	117 – 90	—N/a
SPM 17	5 – 6	(Italy) Armin Egger	1 – 1	(France) Frédéric Koell	93 – 94	111 – 110	20 – 21
SPM 19	7 – 8	(Serbia) Igor Kovačić	0 – 2	(Poland) Michał Szulc	108 – 118	104 – 108	—N/a
2nd unit 19:15 (EEST)
SPM 22	1 – 2	(Romania) Ion Cercel	0 – 2	(Austria) Matthias Zatschkowitsch	100 – 131	99^{5} – 99^{8}	—N/a
SPM 24	3 – 4	(Croatia) Bojan Vlakevski	0 – 2	(Czech Republic) Rostislav Gorecký	113 – 120	101 – 106	—N/a
SPM 21	5 – 6	(Croatia) Alen Kujundžić	0 – 2	(Serbia) Vilmoš Zavarko	110 – 115	106 – 108	—N/a
SPM 23	7 – 8	(Romania) Bogdan Dudas Horatiu	1 – 1	(Czech Republic) Jan Bína	103 – 120	114 – 107	42 – 39

Quarterfinals - Wednesday, 25 May

Match #	Lanes	Player 1	Score	Player 2	Set 1	Set 2	SV
1st unit 21:30 (EEST)
SPM 25	5 – 6	(France) Frédéric Koell	2 – 0	(Germany) Christian Wilke	100 – 93	107 – 96	—N/a
SPM 27	7 – 8	(Serbia) Vilmoš Zavarko	1 – 1	(Austria) Matthias Zatschkowitsch	112 – 107	101 – 108	25 – 27
2nd unit 22:05 (EEST)
SPM 26	5 – 6	(Poland) Michał Szulc	0 – 2	(Hungary) Zsombor Zapletán	97 – 105	98 – 109	—N/a
SPM 28	7 – 8	(Romania) Bogdan Dudas Horatiu	1 – 1	(Czech Republic) Rostislav Gorecký	110 – 103	95 – 100	41 – 40

Semifinals - Wednesday, 25 May

Match #	Lanes	Player 1	Score	Player 2	Set 1	Set 2	SV
23:15 (EEST)
SPM 30	5 – 6	(Austria) Matthias Zatschkowitsch	2 – 0	(Romania) Bogdan Dudas Horatiu	107 – 98	102 – 98	—N/a
SPM 29	7 – 8	(France) Frédéric Koell	0 – 2	(Hungary) Zsombor Zapletán	91 – 105	107 – 110	—N/a

Final - Wednesday, 25 May

Match #	Lanes	Player 1	Score	Player 2	Set 1	Set 2	SV
23:50 (EEST)
SPM 31	5 – 6	(Hungary) Zsombor Zapletán	0 – 2	(Austria) Matthias Zatschkowitsch	108 – 123	103 – 120	—N/a

=== Bracket ===
Round of 32
(Italy) Armin Egger	1	21
(Serbia) Robert Ernješi	1	19
(Denmark) Martin Folmer Hansen	0
(France) Frédéric Koell	2
(Austria) Lukas Temistokle	1	19
(Germany) Christian Wilke	1	20
(Poland) Mateusz Goździk	1	23
(Germany) Florian Fritzmann	1	21
(Slovenia) Danijel Lavrič	0
(Serbia) Igor Kovačić	2
(Poland) Michał Szulc	1	21
(Slovenia) Matej Lepej	1	14
(Germany) Manuel Weiß	1	17
(Hungary) Zsombor Zapletán	1	18
(Romania) Bogdan Tudorie	2
(Sweden) Juha Sahlman	0
(France) Cyril Hugele	1	22
(Croatia) Alen Kujundžić	1	24
(Hungary) Norbert Kiss	0
(Serbia) Vilmoš Zavarko	2
(Romania) Ion Cercel	2
(Estonia) Urmas Lembla	0
(Italy) Aaron Peer Pratzer	0
(Austria) Matthias Zatschkowitsch	2
(Romania) Bogdan Horatiu Dudas	2
(Slovakia) Erik Kuna	0
(Austria) Martin Janits	1	16
(Czech Republic) Jan Bína	1	20
(Croatia) Bojan Vlakevski	2
(Poland) Bartosz Krug	0
(Czech Republic) Rostislav Gorecký	2
(Croatia) Hrvoje Marinović	0

Round of 16
(Italy) Armin Egger	1	20
(France) Frédéric Koell	1	21
(Germany) Christian Wilke	1	23
(Poland) Mateusz Goździk	1	19
(Serbia) Igor Kovačić	0
(Poland) Michał Szulc	2
(Hungary) Zsombor Zapletán	2
(Romania) Bogdan Tudorie	0
(Croatia) Alen Kujundžić	0
(Serbia) Vilmoš Zavarko	2
(Romania) Ion Cercel	0
(Austria) Matthias Zatschkowitsch	2
(Romania) Bogdan Horatiu Dudas	1	42
(Czech Republic) Jan Bína	1	39
(Croatia) Bojan Vlakevski	0
(Czech Republic) Rostislav Gorecký	2

Quarterfinals
(France) Frédéric Koell	2
(Germany) Christian Wilke	0
(Poland) Michał Szulc	0
(Hungary) Zsombor Zapletán	2
(Serbia) Vilmoš Zavarko	1	25
(Austria) Matthias Zatschkowitsch	1	27
(Romania) Bogdan Horatiu Dudas	1	41
(Czech Republic) Rostislav Gorecký	1	40

Semifinals
(France) Frédéric Koell	0
(Hungary) Zsombor Zapletán	2
(Austria) Matthias Zatschkowitsch	2
(Romania) Bogdan Horatiu Dudas	0

Final
(Hungary) Zsombor Zapletán	0
(Austria) Matthias Zatschkowitsch	2
