= 2016 World Singles Ninepin Bowling Classic Championships – Men's combined =

Men's combined at the 2016 World Singles Ninepin Bowling Classic Championships
- Location: Novigrad, Croatia
- Dates: 23-28 May 2016
- Competitors: 64 from 17 nations
- Winning score: 949

Medalists
gold medal	(Serbia) Igor Kovačić
silver medal	(Serbia) Vilmoš Zavarko
bronze medal	(Croatia) Hrvoje Marinović

The men's combined event at the 2016 World Singles Ninepin Bowling Classic Championships was held in Novigrad, Croatia from 23 May to 28 May 2016.

== Results ==
The result for the combined was the sum of best results from a single starts in the single classic and sprint.

Rank	Name	Country	Single classic						Sprint					Total
Rank	Name	Country	Q	1/16	1/8	1/4	1/2	F	1/16	1/8	1/4	1/2	F	Total
1st place, gold medalist(s)	Igor Kovačić	Serbia	704	699	**711**	633	636		**238**	198	202	208		949
2nd place, silver medalist(s)	Vilmoš Zavarko	Serbia	**699**	679	671	680	683	687	235	225	220	**247**	230	946
3rd place, bronze medalist(s)	Hrvoje Marinović	Croatia	**700**	663	640	654	658		207	**210**				910
4	Thomas Schneider	Germany	**677**	650					**224**					901
5	Tamas Kiss	Hungary	653	654	**672**	608			**220**					892
6	Primož Pintarič	Slovenia	**643**	628					**249**	211				892
7	Uroš Stoklas	Slovenia	**656**	645					183	**231**	201			887
8	Erik Kuna	Slovakia	630	**660**	605				**224**	218	204			884
9	Sasa Igumanović	Austria	**649**	405					**235**	191				884
10	Mikołaj Konopka	Poland	654	606	**664**				199	217	**219**			883
11	Peter Nemček	Slovakia	648	**657**					**217**	212				874
12	Manuel Weiß	Germany	**647**	608					**222**	182				869
13	Jaroslav Hažva	Czech Republic	**653**	607					**214**					867
14	Atilla Nemes	Hungary	**645**	633	619				**222**					867
15	Timo Hehl	Germany	**644**	618					**222**					866
16	Robert Ernješi	Serbia	**632**	625					**213**	197				845
17	Pavel Jiroušek	Czech Republic	**631**	572					200	**210**	205	194		841
18	Gianni Della Martire	France	**613**						**224**					837
19	Nicolae Lupu	Romania	**614**						**222**	216	198			836
20	Frederic Koell	France	**583**						**243**	224	210	226	214	826
21	Piotr Kieliba	Poland	**611**						**211**					822
22	Darko Lotina	Bosnia and Herzegovina	**604**						**205**					809
23	Paul Ciprian Rohotin	Romania	**609**						194	**196**				805
24	Marko Trklja	Bosnia and Herzegovina	**597**						**202**					799
25	Markko Abel	Estonia	**626**	622					**171**					797
26	Georg Righi	Italy	**580**						**216**					796
27	Konrad Mocarski	Poland	**590**						**199**					789
28	Nikola Muše	Croatia	**596**						**192**					788
29	Kristian Kis	Montenegro	**597**						**181**					778
30	Peter Wiinber Soerensen	Denmark	**585**						**192**					777
31	Petruţ Ovidiu Mihălcioiu	Romania	**569**						**204**					773
32	Frank Nielsen	Denmark	**536**						**202**					738
33	Julien Schmitt	France	**678**	628										678
34	Martin Rathmayer	Austria	**653**	626	651	607								653
35	Zsombor Zapletán	Hungary	648	**659**										678
36	Mathias Dirnberger	Germany	**643**	642	631									678
37	Jiří Vícha	Czech Republic	642	**668**	641									678
38	Norbert Kiss	Hungary	641	662	653	632	**683**	657						683
39	Miloš Simijonović	Serbia	639	**667**	641	652								678
40	Philipp Vsetecka	Austria	632	638	587									678
41	László Karsai	Hungary	632	613	**633**									678
42	Mathias Weber	Germany	**631**	619										678
43	Mario Mušanić	Croatia	631	**657**	621	646								678
44	Milan Svoboda	Czech Republic	628	**673**	628									678
45	Jürgen Ertl	Austria	**624**	594										678
46	Matej Lepej	Slovenia	620	**640**										678
47	Levente Kakuk	Hungary	**619**											678
48	Lukas Huber	Austria	**619**											678
49	Klemen Mahkovic	Slovenia	**618**											678
50	Leszek Torka	Poland	**618**											678
51	Tomáš Pašiak	Slovakia	**618**											678
52	Luka Bolanca	Croatia	**617**											678
53	Roman Gradenitsch	Austria	**615**											678
54	Uroš Jagličić	Serbia	**615**											678
55	Jure Starman	Slovenia	**613**											678
56	Danijel Tepša	Serbia	**600**											678
57	Ion Cercel	Romania	**600**											678
58	Florian Thaler	Italy	**599**											678
59	Georges Ungurean	France	**593**											678
60	Fabian Seitz	Germany	**585**											678
61	Kaido Kirs	Estonia	**581**											678
62	Fredrik Nilsson	Sweden	**564**											678
63	Oswald Kofler	Italy	**550**											678
64	Pavle Parović	Montenegro	**473**											678

Key
Colour	Result
Red	Do not qualify (DNQ)
White	Do not participate (DNP)
Blank	No result (-)
Blank	Whithdrawn (WD)
Text formatting	Meaning
**Bold**	Best result
Italics	Comment
