= 2022 World Singles Ninepin Bowling Classic Championships – Men's combined =

Bowling championship

Men's combined at the 2022 World Singles Ninepin Bowling Classic Championships
- Location: Elva, Estonia
- Dates: 23-28 May 2022
- Competitors: 62 from 15 nations
- Winning score: 948

Medalists
gold medal	Vilmoš Zavarko	Serbia
silver medal	Christian Wilke	Germany
bronze medal	Florian Fritzmann	Germany

The men's combined event at the 2022 World Singles Ninepin Bowling Classic Championships was held in Elva, Estonia from 23 May to 28 May 2022.

== Results ==
The result for the combined was the sum of best results from a single starts in the single classic and sprint.

Rank	Name	Country	Single						Sprint					Total
Rank	Name	Country	Q	1/16	1/8	1/4	1/2	F	1/16	1/8	1/4	1/2	F	Total
1st place, gold medalist(s)	Vilmoš Zavarko	Serbia	**709**	674	694	701	690	685	**239**	223	213			948
2nd place, silver medalist(s)	Christian Wilke	Germany	696	664	**708**	649			232	**236**	189			944
3rd place, bronze medalist(s)	Florian Fritzmann	Germany	660	661	637	**714**	683		**214**					936
4	Alen Kujundžić	Croatia	**712**	682	675	643	638	646	212	**216**				928
5	Matthias Zatschkowitsch	Austria	**679**	661	638				217	230	215	209	**243**	922
6	Martin Janits	Austria	**673**	651					**232**					905
7	Zsombor Zapletán	Hungary	**663**	643	609				214	**235**	214	215	211	898
8	Bojan Vlakevski	Croatia	657	664	**677**				**219**	214				896
9	Norbert Kiss	Hungary	**674**	631					**222**					896
10	Robert Ernješi	Serbia	631	**671**					**224**					895
11	Lukas Temistokle	Austria	635	**668**	632				**221**					889
12	Rostislav Gorecký	Czech Republic	**660**	622					**227**	226	203			887
13	Hrvoje Marinović	Croatia	**672**	645					**214**					886
14	Jan Bína	Czech Republic	639	**646**					**234**	227				880
15	Frédéric Koell	France	644	**644**					**236**	204	207	198		880
16	Manuel Weiß	Germany	659	658	**667**	642	637		**212**					879
17	Matej Lepej	Slovenia	**650**	634	644				**228**					878
18	Igor Kovačić	Serbia	**637**	609					**240**					877
19	Danijel Lavrič	Slovenia	**668**	584					**205**					873
20	Armin Egger	Italy	**641**	621	613				**226**	204				867
21	Erik Kuna	Slovakia	650	651	**653**				**206**					859
22	Bogdan Dudas Horatiu	Romania	**629**						212	**217**	205	196		846
23	Michał Szulc	Poland	**615**						199	**226**	195			841
24	Ion Cercel	Romania	**606**						**227**	199				833
25	Bogdan Tudorie	Romania	**613**						**217**	195				830
26	Cyril Hugele	France	**617**						**210**					827
27	Urmas Lembla	Estonia	**621**						**206**					827
28	Bartosz Krug	Poland	**621**						**192**					813
29	Mateusz Goździk	Poland	**586**						211	**211**				797
30	Martin Folmer Hansen	Denmark	**571**						**214**					785
31	Juha Sahlman	Sweden	**567**						**176**					743
32	Luka Bolanča	Croatia	634	654	**679**	624								679
33	Jaroslav Hažva	Czech Republic	634	**678**	642									678
34	Čongor Baranj	Serbia	661	**665**	664	629								665
35	Jürgen Pointinger	Germany	633	**656**										656
36	Adrijan Lončarević	Serbia	**650**	609										650
37	Radovan Vlajkov	Serbia	**650**											650
38	Daniel Barth	Germany	**645**											645
39	Manuel Lallinger	Germany	**640**	607										640
40	Ivan Čech	Slovakia	635	**639**	628	615								639
41	Markus Vsetecka	Austria	**633**	615										633
42	Matija Mance	Croatia	**633**											633
43	Károly Kozma	Hungary	**629**											629
44	Gašper Kragelj	Slovenia	**629**											629
45	Lukáš Juris	Slovakia	**629**											629
46	Blaž Čerin	Slovenia	**624**											624
47	Levente Kakuk	Hungary	**623**											623
48	Lukas Huber	Austria	**622**											622
49	Peter Nemček	Slovakia	**615**											615
50	Bystrík Vadovič	Slovakia	**613**											613
51	Milan Blecha	Czech Republic	**611**											611
52	Zoltán Móricz	Hungary	**609**											609
53	Franci Velišček	Slovenia	**608**											608
54	Philipp Vsetecka	Austria	**605**											605
55	Zdeněk Ransdorf	Czech Republic	**604**											604
56	Ivan Totić	Croatia	**591**											591
57	Karol Sellmann	Poland	**584**											584
58	Petr Dobeš	Czech Republic	**583**											583
59	Stefan Romeo Balan	Romania	**570**											570
60	János Brancsek	Hungary	**570**											570
61	Markko Abel	Estonia	**559**											559
62	Aaron Peer Pratzer	Italy							**193**					193

Key
Colour	Result
Red	Do not qualify (DNQ)
White	Do not participate (DNP)
Blank	No result (-)
Blank	Whithdrawn (WD)
Text formatting	Meaning
**Bold**	Best result
Italics	Comment
