= 2016 World Singles Ninepin Bowling Classic Championships – Men's single =

Men's single at the 2016 World Singles Ninepin Bowling Classic Championships
- Location: Novigrad, Croatia
- Dates: 23-24 May 2016 (Qualification); 26-28 May 2018 (Knock-out phase)
- Competitors: 64 from 16 nations
- Top scorer: (Serbia) Igor Kovačić 711

Medalists
gold medal	(Serbia) Vilmoš Zavarko
silver medal	(Hungary) Norbert Kiss
bronze medal	(Serbia) Igor Kovačić
bronze medal	(Croatia) Hrvoje Marinović

The men's single event at the 2016 World Singles Ninepin Bowling Classic Championships was held in Novigrad, Croatia. Qualification took place on 23-24 May, while the knock-out phase from 26 May to 28 May 2016.

== Results ==
=== Qualification ===
32 players qualified for the knock-out phase.

Rank	Name	Country	All	Clean	X	Total	Notes
1	Igor Kovačić	Serbia	418	286	1	704	Q
2	Hrvoje Marinović	Croatia	433	267	0	700	Q
3	Vilmoš Zavarko	Serbia	435	264	0	699	Q
4	Julien Schmitt	France	422	256	1	678	Q
5	Thomas Schneider	Germany	421	256	0	677	Q
6	Uroš Stoklas	Slovenia	401	255	0	656	Q
7	Mikołaj Konopka	Poland	412	242	2	654	Q
8	Martin Rathmayer	Austria	406	247	0	653	Q
9	Jaroslav Hažva	Czech Republic	406	247	0	653	Q
10	Tamás Kiss	Hungary	406	247	0	653	Q
11	Sasa Igumanović	Austria	411	238	1	649	Q
12	Peter Nemček	Slovakia	406	242	0	648	Q
13	Zsombor Zapletán	Hungary	408	240	2	648	Q
14	Manuel Weiß	Germany	404	243	1	647	Q
15	Atilla Nemes	Hungary	411	234	1	645	Q
16	Timo Hehl	Germany	405	239	1	644	Q
17	Mathias Dirnberger	Germany	377	266	0	643	Q
18	Primož Pintarič	Slovenia	428	215	1	643	Q
19	Jiří Vícha	Czech Republic	411	231	0	642	Q
20	Norbert Kiss	Hungary	405	236	1	641	Q
21	Miloš Simijonović	Serbia	427	212	2	639	Q
22	Philipp Vsetecka	Austria	391	241	5	632	Q
23	Robert Ernješi	Serbia	402	230	2	632	Q
24	László Karsai	Hungary	414	218	0	632	Q
25	Mathias Weber	Germany	404	227	0	631	Q
26	Pavel Jiroušek	Czech Republic	406	225	1	631	Q
27	Mario Mušanić	Croatia	417	214	2	631	Q
28	Erik Kuna	Slovakia	404	226	0	630	Q
29	Milan Svoboda	Czech Republic	422	206	2	628	Q
30	Markko Abel	Estonia	417	209	6	626	Q
31	Jürgen Ertl	Austria	395	229	0	624	Q
32	Matej Lepej	Slovenia	390	230	4	620	Q
33	Levente Kakuk	Hungary	396	223	1	619	
34	Lukas Huber	Austria	419	200	2	619	
35	Klemen Mahkovic	Slovenia	391	227	1	618	
36	Leszek Torka	Poland	404	214	5	618	
37	Tomáš Pašiak	Slovakia	416	202	1	618	
38	Luka Bolanca	Croatia	398	219	1	617	
39	Roman Gardenitsch	Austria	382	233	2	615	
40	Nicolae Lupu	Romania	389	225	1	614	
41	Gianni Della Martire	France	393	220	5	613	
42	Uroš Jagličić	Serbia	403	212	3	615	
43	Jure Starman	Slovenia	404	209	2	613	
44	Piotr Kieliba	Poland	406	205	1	611	
45	Paul Ciprian Rohotin	Romania	397	212	2	609	
46	Darko Lotina	Bosnia and Herzegovina	400	204	2	604	
47	Danijel Tepša	Serbia	385	215	0	600	
48	Ion Cercel	Romania	396	204	3	600	
49	Florian Thaler	Italy	394	205	2	599	
50	Kristian Kis	Montenegro	372	225	4	597	
51	Marko Trklja	Bosnia and Herzegovina	411	186	2	597	
52	Nikola Muše	Croatia	387	209	4	596	
53	Georges Ungurean	France	375	218	1	593	
54	Konrad Mocarski	Poland	362	228	0	590	
55	Peter Wiinber Soerensen	Denmark	384	201	5	585	
56	Fabian Seitz	Germany	393	192	1	585	
57	Frédéric Koell	France	418	165	6	583	
58	Kaido Kirs	Estonia	367	214	3	581	
59	Georg Righi	Italy	397	183	3	580	
60	Petruţ Ovidiu Mihălcioiu	Romania	375	194	1	569	
61	Frederik Nilsson	Sweden	371	193	8	564	
62	Oswald Kofler	Italy	360	190	8	550	
63	Frank Nielsen	Denmark	389	147	9	536	
64	Pavle Perović	Montenegro	338	135	23	473	

=== Finals ===
According to the results of the qualification, 32 players were put together in bouts, which took place on standard match rules - 4 sets of 30 throws. The competitor who obtains a larger number of sets wins. With an equal number of sets decides a higher total score.

Round of 32; 26 May
1	(Serbia) Igor Kovačić	3	669
32	(Slovenia) Matej Lepej	1	640
17	(Germany) Mathias Dirnberger	4	642
16	(Germany) Timo Hehl	0	618
9	(Czech Republic) Jaroslav Hažva	2	607
24	(Hungary) László Karsai	2	613
25	(Germany) Mathias Weber	2	619
8	(Austria) Martin Rathmayer	2	626
5	(Germany) Thomas Schneider	2	650
28	(Slovakia) Erik Kuna	2	660
21	(Serbia) Miloš Simijonović	4	667
12	(Slovakia) Peter Nemček	0	657
13	(Hungary) Zsombor Zapletán	2	659
20	(Hungary) Norbert Kiss	2	662
29	(Czech Republic) Milan Svoboda	3	673
4	(France) Julien Schmitt	1	628
3	(Serbia) Vilmoš Zavarko	3.5	679
30	(Estonia) Markko Abel	0.5	622
19	(Czech Republic) Jiří Vícha	3	668
14	(Germany) Manuel Weiß	1	608
11	(Austria) Sasa Igumanović DNF	0	405
22	(Austria) Philipp Vsetecka	4	638
27	(Croatia) Mario Mušanić	3	657
6	(Slovenia) Uroš Stoklas	1	645
7	(Poland) Mikołaj Konopka	3	606
26	(Czech Republic) Pavel Jiroušek	1	572
23	(Serbia) Robert Ernješi	2	625
10	(Hungary) Tamás Kiss	2	654
15	(Hungary) Attila Nemes	2	633
18	(Slovenia) Primož Pintarič	2	628
31	(Austria) Jürgen Ertl	2	594
2	(Croatia) Hrvoje Marinović	2	663

Round of 16; 27 May
(Serbia) Igor Kovačić	4	711
(Germany) Mathias Dirnberger	0	631
(Hungary) László Karsai	1	633
(Austria) Martin Rathmayer	3	651
(Slovakia) Erik Kuna	1	605
(Serbia) Miloš Simijonović	3	641
(Hungary) Norbert Kiss	4	653
(Czech Republic) Milan Svoboda	0	628
(Serbia) Vilmoš Zavarko	3	671
(Czech Republic) Jiří Vícha	1	641
(Austria) Philipp Vsetecka	1	587
(Croatia) Mario Mušanić	3	621
(Poland) Mikołaj Konopka	2	664
(Hungary) Tamás Kiss	2	672
(Hungary) Attila Nemes	2	619
(Croatia) Hrvoje Marinović	2	640

Quarterfinals; 27 May
(Serbia) Igor Kovačić	2	633
(Austria) Martin Rathmayer	2	607
(Serbia) Miloš Simijonović	1	652
(Hungary) Norbert Kiss	3	632
(Serbia) Vilmoš Zavarko	4	680
(Croatia) Mario Mušanić	0	646
(Hungary) Tamás Kiss	0,5	608
(Croatia) Hrvoje Marinović	3,5	654

Semifinals; 28 May
(Serbia) Igor Kovačić	1	636
(Hungary) Norbert Kiss	3	683
(Serbia) Vilmoš Zavarko	2	683
(Croatia) Hrvoje Marinović	2	658

Final; 28 May
(Hungary) Norbert Kiss	1.5	657
(Serbia) Vilmoš Zavarko	2,5	687
