= 2017 World Team Ninepin Bowling Classic Championships =

European bowling competition

7th World Team Ninepin Bowling Classic Championships
- Host city: Dettenheim
- Country: Germany
- Events: 2
- Opening: May 19, 2017
- Closing: May 27, 2017

Location in Europe
Location in Germany

The 2017 World Team Ninepin Bowling Classic Championships were the seventh edition of the team championships and held in Dettenheim, Germany, from 19 May to 27 May 2017.

In men's tournament Serbia secured gold medal, while in women's tournament world champion title was captured by host Germany.

== Schedule ==
Two competitions were held.

All time are local (UTC+2).

Date	Time	Round
19 May 2017	19:00	Opening ceremony
20 May 2017	08:00	Group stage
21 May 2017	08:00	Group stage
22 May 2017	08:00	Group stage
23 May 2017	08:00	Group stage
24 May 2017	08:00	Group stage
25 May 2017	08:00	Group stage
26 May 2017	08:00	Quarterfinals
27 May 2017	08:00	Semifinals
27 May 2017	16:00	Finals
27 May 2017	20:00	Medal and closing ceremony

== Participating teams ==
=== Men ===
- Austria
- Bosnia and Herzegovina
- Croatia
- Czech Republic
- Denmark
- Estonia
- France
- Germany
- Hungary
- Italy
- Poland
- Romania
- Serbia
- Slovakia
- Slovenia

=== Women ===
- Austria
- Bosnia and Herzegovina
- Croatia
- Czech Republic
- Denmark
- Estonia
- France
- Germany
- Hungary
- Italy
- Romania
- Serbia
- Slovakia
- Slovenia

== Medal summary ==
Event	Gold	Silver	Bronze
Men	Serbia; Čongor Baranj; Robert Ernješi; Uroš Jagličić; Milan Jovetić; Igor Kovačić; Miloš Simijonović; Danijel Tepša; Radovan Vljakov; Vilmoš Zavarko	Hungary; Claudiu Boanta; János Brancsek; Sándor Farkas; Zoltan Flavius Fehér; Levente Kakuk; László Karsai; Norbert Kiss; Gábor Kovács; Zsombor Zapletán	Germany; Timo Hehl; Timo Hoffmann; Torsten Reiser; Daniel Schmid; Thomas Schneider; Axel Schondelmaier; Fabian Seitz; Mathias Werber Slovakia; Ivan Čech; Radoslav Foltin; Martin Kozák; Erik Kuna; Peter Nemček; Tomáš Pašiak; Milan Tomka; Bystrík Vadovič
Women	Germany; Saskia Barth; Sina Beißer; Alina Dollheimer; Corinna Kastner; Daniela Kicker; Simone Schneider; Saskia Seitz; Melina Zimmermann	Croatia; Ana Bacan; Mirna Bosak; Iva Cindrić; Tihana Čavlović; Ana Jambrović; Marijana Liović; Ines Maričić; Nataša Ravnić-Gasparini; Klara Sedlar	Czech Republic; Naděžda Dobešová; Olga Hejhalová; Alena Kantnerová; Renáta Navrkalová; Veronika Petrov; Nikola Tatoušková; Natálie Topičová; Dana Wiedermannová; Hana Wiedermannová Slovenia; Petra Bašek; Patricija Bizjak; Barbara Fidel; Anja Kozmus; Irena Mejač; Eva Sajko; Rada Savič; Brigita Strelec; Nada Savič

=== Medal table ===
* Host nation (Host nation)

Rank	Nation	Gold	Silver	Bronze	Total
1	Germany (GER)*	1	0	1	2
2	Serbia (SRB)	1	0	0	1
3	Croatia (CRO)	0	1	0	1
3	Hungary (HUN)	0	1	0	1
5	Czech Republic (CZE)	0	0	1	1
5	Slovakia (SVK)	0	0	1	1
5	Slovenia (SLO)	0	0	1	1
Totals (7 entries)		2	2	4	8
