= 2016 World Singles Ninepin Bowling Classic Championships – Men's sprint =

Men's sprint event at the 2016 Worlds Singles Ninepin Bowling Classic Championships

Men's sprint at the 2016 World Singles Ninepin Bowling Classic Championships
- Location: Novigrad, Croatia
- Dates: 25 May 2016
- Competitors: 32 from 17 nations

Medalists
gold medal	(Serbia) Vilmoš Zavarko
silver medal	(France) Frédéric Koell
bronze medal	(Czech Republic) Pavel Jiroušek
bronze medal	(Serbia) Igor Kovačić

The men's sprint event at the 2016 World Singles Ninepin Bowling Classic Championships was held in Cluj-Napoca, Romania on 25 May 2016.

The title of world champion was won by Serbian Vilmoš Zavarko, who defeated Frenchman Frédéric Koell in the final. Bronze medals went to semi-finalists Pavel Jiroušek of the Czech Republic and Serbian Igor Kovačić.

== Results ==
=== Starting places ===
The starting places have been allocated on the basis of each team's achievements during the previous championships.

	(Austria) AUT	(Bosnia and Herzegovina) BIH	(Croatia) CRO	(Czech Republic) CZE	(Denmark) DEN	(Estonia) EST	(France) FRA	(Germany) GER	(Hungary) HUN	(Italy) ITA	(Montenegro) MNE	(Poland) POL	(Romania) ROU	(Slovenia) SLO	(Serbia) SRB	(Slovakia) SVK	(Sweden) SWE	Total
Number of seeds	1	2	2	2	2	1	1	3	2	1	1	3	3	2	3	2	1	32

=== Draw ===
The players were drawn into pairs with the reservation that competitors from the same country can not play in the first round against each other.

Round of 32
(Poland) Mikołaj Konopka	2
(Estonia) Markko Abel	0
(Slovakia) Peter Nemček	1	21
(Poland) Piotr Kieliba	1	20
(Bosnia and Herzegovina) Marko Trklja	0
(France) Frédéric Koell	2
(Italy) Georgh Righi	0
(Austria) Sasa Igumanović	2
(Romania) Petruţ Ovidiu Mihălcioiu	1	15
(Slovenia) Uroš Stoklas	1	25
(Croatia) Hrvoje Marinović	1	21
(Germany) Thomas Schneider	1	20
(Montenegro) Kristian Kis	1	20
(Czech Republic) Pavel Jiroušek	1	22
(Romania) Paul Ciprian Rohotin	1	21
(Croatia) Nikola Muše	1	19
(Germany) Manuel Weiß	2
(Denmark) Franck Nielsen	0
(Romania) Nicolae Lupu	2
(Bosnia and Herzegovina) Darko Lotina	0
(Czech Republic) Jaroslav Hažva	0
(Slovenia) Primož Pintarič	2
(Serbia) Vilmoš Zavarko	2
(Hungary) Atilla Nemes	0
(Denmark) Peter Wiinberg Soerensen	1	20
(Sweden) Hakan Strömberg	1	22
(Germany) Timo Hehl	1	22
(Serbia) Igor Kovačić	1	25
(Hungary) Tamás Kiss	1	20
(Slovakia) Erik Kuna	1	24
(Poland) Konrad Mocarski	0
(Serbia) Robert Ernješi	2

Round of 16
(Poland) Mikołaj Konopka	2
(Slovakia) Peter Nemček	0
(France) Frédéric Koell	2
(Austria) Sasa Igumanović	0
(Slovenia) Uroš Stoklas	2
(Croatia) Hrvoje Marinović	0
(Czech Republic) Pavel Jiroušek	1	23
(Romania) Paul Ciprian Rohotin	1	18
(Germany) Manuel Weiß	0
(Romania) Nicolae Lupu	2
(Slovenia) Primož Pintarič	0
(Serbia) Vilmoš Zavarko	2
(Sweden) Hakan Strömberg	1	23
(Serbia) Igor Kovačić	1	24
(Slovakia) Erik Kuna	2
(Serbia) Robert Ernješi	0

Quarterfinals
(Poland) Mikołaj Konopka	1	20
(France) Frédéric Koell	1	23
(Slovenia) Uroš Stoklas	0
(Czech Republic) Pavel Jiroušek	2
(Romania) Nicolae Lupu	1	37
(Serbia) Vilmoš Zavarko	1	44
(Serbia) Igor Kovačić	1	25
(Slovakia) Erik Kuna	1	22

Semifinals
(France) Frédéric Koell	2
(Czech Republic) Pavel Jiroušek	0
(Serbia) Vilmoš Zavarko	2
(Serbia) Igor Kovačić	0

Final
(France) Frédéric Koell	1	19
(Serbia) Vilmoš Zavarko	1	22
