= 2018 World Singles Ninepin Bowling Classic Championships – Men's combined =

Bowling championship

Men's combined at the 2018 World Singles Ninepin Bowling Classic Championships
- Location: Cluj-Napoca, Romania
- Dates: 21-26 May 2018
- Competitors: 66 from 16 nations
- Winning score: 939

Medalists
gold medal	(Serbia) Vilmoš Zavarko
silver medal	(Germany) Timo Hoffmann
bronze medal	(Croatia) Hrvoje Marinović

The men's combined event at the 2018 World Singles Ninepin Bowling Classic Championships was held in Cluj-Napoca, Romania from 21 May to 26 May 2018.

== Results ==
The results for the combined was the sum of best results from a single starts in the single and sprint.

Rank	Name	Country	Single						Sprint					Total
Rank	Name	Country	Q	1/16	1/8	1/4	1/2	F	1/16	1/8	1/4	1/2	F	Total
1st place, gold medalist(s)	Vilmoš Zavarko	Serbia	682	**696**	687	694	678	695	241	224	227	241	**243**	939
2nd place, silver medalist(s)	Timo Hoffmann	Germany	**693**	651					215	**229**				922
3rd place, bronze medalist(s)	Hrvoje Marinović	Croatia	652	630	**698**	531			**213**	203				911
4	Jan Bína	Czech Republic	632	667	**679**	650	584		212	**230**	199			909
5	Igor Kovačić	Serbia	659	688	**690**	639	671		**214**					904
6	Matej Lepej	Slovenia	**679**	605					222					901
7	Philipp Vsetecka	Austria	618	631	**672**	638			226	**227**	203			899
8	Lukas Huber	Austria	618	**669**	604				**222**					891
9	Michał Szulc	Poland	626	**653**					**229**	207				882
10	Jiří Veselý	Czech Republic	609	**670**	621				**211**					881
11	Axel Schondelmaier	Germany	643	618	**648**	566			213	208	219	**225**	206	873
12	Tamás Kiss	Hungary	**674**	630					**193**					867
13	Zsombor Zapletán	Hungary	**621**	602					235	**241**	190			862
14	Franci Velišček	Slovenia	621	**642**					**218**					860
15	Robert Ernješi	Serbia	**657**	638	638				**197**					854
16	Jürgen Pointinger	Germany	**635**	605	618				**218**	212				853
17	Nemanja Galić	Bosnia and Herzegovina	**630**	600					**212**					842
18	Tomaš Pasiak	Slovakia	**623**	574					**206**					829
19	Petruţ Ovidiu Mihălcioiu	Romania	**601**						**223**	216	208			824
20	Ivan Totić	Croatia	**601**						**214**	202				815
21	Wolfgang Blaas	Italy	**598**						212	**215**	198	210		813
22	Bartosz Krug	Poland	**610**	604					**200**	187				810
23	Peter Nemček	Slovakia	**594**						212					806
24	Gregor Bajželj	Slovenia	**590**						**208**					798
25	Nicolae Lupu	Romania	**581**						—	210	**217**	214		798
26	Erik Kuna	Slovakia	**600**						**188**					788
27	Georges Ungurean	France	**571**						**199**	197				770
28	Guillaume Changenet	France	**576**						**186**					762
29	Markko Abel	Estonia	**581**						**170**					751
30	Levente Kakuk	Hungary	649	**686**	661									686
31	Bojan Vlakevski	Macedonia	660	656	**680**	638								680
32	Manuel Weiß	Germany	638	**666**	633	659	624	627						666
33	Mathias Dirnberger	Germany	620	**655**										655
34	Ion Cercel	Romania	**642**	620	633									642
35	Károly Kozma	Hungary	**639**	630	604									639
36	Zoltan Flavius Fehér	Hungary	**633**	608	615									633
37	Markus Vsetecka	Austria	**631**	603										631
38	Mathias Weber	Germany	623	**627**										627
39	Daniel Tepša	Serbia	**626**	596										626
40	Milan Jovetić	Serbia	**624**	619										624
41	Jan Endršt	Czech Republic	**623**	594										623
42	Radovan Vlajkov	Serbia	**622**	606										622
43	Piotr Kieliba	Poland	**607**											607
44	Marko Trklja	Bosnia and Herzegovina	**604**											604
45	László Karsai	Hungary	**602**											602
46	Davor Sobočan	Slovenia	**599**											599
47	Georg Righi	Italy	**598**											598
48	Dario Radoš	Croatia	**596**											596
49	Bystrík Vadovič	Slovakia	**588**											588
50	Mihael Grivičić	Croatia	**588**											588
51	Arkadiusz Stachecki	Poland	**587**											587
52	Marko Jeličić	Croatia	**587**											587
53	Armin Egger	Italy	**586**											586
54	Ondřej Sobčák	Czech Republic	**582**											582
55	Alexander Tischler	Austria	**579**											579
56	Jürgen Ertl	Austria	**577**											577
57	Mario Liović	Croatia	**575**											575
58	Martin Kozák	Slovakia	**575**											575
59	Pavel Jiroušek	Czech Republic	**568**											568
60	Đorđe Paštar	Bosnia and Herzegovina	**567**											567
61	Henning Bo Poulsen	Denmark	**555**						WD					555
62	Filip Dejda	Czech Republic	**552**											552
63	Marek Sööt	Estonia	**543**											543
64	Peter Wiinberg Soerensen	Denmark	**542**											542
65	Boris Benedik	Macedonia							207	**219**				219
66	Horatiu Bogdan Dudas	Romania							**203**					203

Key
Colour	Result
Red	Do not qualify (DNQ)
White	Do not participate (DNP)
Blank	No result (-)
Blank	Whithdrawn (WD)
Text formatting	Meaning
**Bold**	Best result
Italics	Comment
