= 2025 World Team Ninepin Bowling Classic Championships – Men's tournament =

Tournament details
- Host country: Hungary
- City: Székesfehérvár
- Venue: 1 (in 1 host city)
- Dates: 30 May - 7 June
- Teams: 16

Final positions
- Champions: Serbia (7th title)
- Runners-up: Germany
- Third place: Austria; Hungary

Tournament statistics
- Matches played: 31
- Top scorers: Player: Alen Kujundžić 705; Team: Serbia 3934

The men's tournament at the 2025 World Team Ninepin Bowling Classic Championships was held in Székesfehérvár, Hungary, from 30 May to 7 June 2025.

Serbia captured their seventh title by defeating Germans 6-2 in the final match. Bronze was secured by semifinalists Austrians and Hungarians.

== Participating teams ==
16 associations applied to participate in the men's teams competition.

- Austria
- Croatia
- Czechia
- Denmark
- Estonia
- France
- Germany
- Hungary
- Italy
- North Macedonia
- Poland
- Romania
- Serbia
- Slovakia
- Slovenia
- Sweden

=== Draw ===
Groups were drawn on December 16, 2024, during the conference in Székesfehérvár.

Pot 1	Pot 2	Pot 3	Pot 4
Austria; Croatia; Germany; Serbia	Czechia; Hungary (hosts); Romania; Slovakia	Italy; North Macedonia; Poland; Slovenia	Denmark; Estonia; France; Sweden

=== Groups ===
Group A	Group B	Group C	Group D
Serbia; Romania; Poland; Estonia	Austria; Hungary (hosts); Italy; Denmark	Germany; Slovakia; Slovenia; Sweden	Croatia; Czechia; North Macedonia; France

== Group stage ==
=== Group A ===
		Pts	Matches			Team points		Set points		Qualification
Rank	Team	Pts	W	D	L	W	L	W	L	Qualification
1	Serbia	6	3	0	0	24	0	61.5	10.5	Advance to quarterfinals
2	Poland	4	2	0	1	15	9	35.5	36.5	Advance to quarterfinals
3	Romania	2	1	0	2	6	18	25.5	46.5	
4	Estonia	0	0	0	3	3	21	20.5	51.5	

30 May 2025
11:40 CEST

Serbia	8 – 0	Estonia
3817 21.0	Report	3.0 3431
Alen Kujundžić 666 3.5		0.5 604 Markko Abel
Igor Kovačić 623 2.5		577 1.5 Marek Sööt
Vilmoš Zavarko 665 4.0		0.0 555 Kaido Kirs
Robert Ernješi 613 3.0		1.0 577 Gert Piksar
( (substituted on) 61 Želislav Jakab) Čongor Baranj 644 4.0		0.0 561 Runnar Lindepuu
( (substituted on) 61 Radovan Vlajkov) Daniel Tepša 606 4.0		0.0 557 Indrek Saar

Alba Aréna, Székesfehérvár

30 May 2025
15:20 CEST

Romania	0 – 8	Poland
3516 7.0	Report	17.0 3646
Ion Cercel 612 1.5		2.5 617 Michał Szulc
Bogdan Tudorie 591 2.0		2.0 613 Dawid Strzelczak
Petruţ Ovidiu Mihălcioiu 582 0.0		4.0 613 Mateusz Goździk
Călin-Ioan Cazacu 590 1.0		3.0 626 Tomasz Masłowski
Vlad-George Sabău 564 1.5		2.5 584 Jakub Kuryło
( (substituted on) 61 Alexandru Denis Pădurean) Flavius Banga 577 1.0		3.0 593 Bartosz Krug

Alba Aréna, Székesfehérvár

1 June 2025
08:00 CEST

Romania	6 – 2	Estonia
3566 15.0	Report	9.0 3407
Ion Cercel 634 4.0		0.0 563 Raul Rebane
Bogdan Tudorie 571 3.0		1.0 545 Indrek Saar
Alexandru Denis Pădurean 619 3.0		1.0 580 Markko Abel
( (substituted on) 61 Petruț Ovidiu Mihalcioiu) Florin Opincă 562 1.0		3.0 554 Marko Muts
Ștefan Romeo Bălan 582 3.0		1.0 572 Kaido Kirs
Vlad-George Săbău 598 1.0		3.0 593 Marek Sööt

Alba Aréna, Székesfehérvár

1 June 2025
19:00 CEST

Poland	0 – 8	Serbia
3476 4.0	Report	20.0 3901
Mateusz Goździk 619 2.0		2.0 647 Alen Kujundžić
Jarosław Michalak 540 0.0		4.0 659 Čongor Baranj
Jakub Cwojdziński 620 1.0		3.0 662 Igor Kovačić
Tomasz Masłowski 557 0.0		4.0 622 Robert Ernješi
Jakub Kuryło 561 1.0		3.0 630 Vilmoš Zavarko ( (substituted on) 61 Želislav Jakab)
Dawid Strzelczak 579 0.0		4.0 681 Mateja Tadić

Alba Aréna, Székesfehérvár

3 June 2025
11:40 CEST

Estonia	1 – 7	Poland
3474 8.5	Report	15.5 3529
Raul Rebane 595 1.0		3.0 605 Mateusz Goździk
Gert Piksar 584 2.5		1.5 610 Jakub Cwojdziński
Marek Sööt 600 1.5		2.5 587 Michał Szulc
Kaido Kirs 597 1.0		3.0 601 Jakub Kuryło
Runnar Lindepuu 553 2.0		2.0 556 Jarosław Bonk ( (substituted on) 61 Tomasz Masłowski)
Marko Muts 545 0.5		3.5 570 Bartosz Krug

Alba Aréna, Székesfehérvár

3 June 2025
15:20 CEST

Serbia	8 – 0	Romania
3934 20.5	Report	3.5 3626
Vilmoš Zavarko 678 4.0		0.0 567 Alexandru Denis Pădurean
Čongor Baranj 642 3.0		1.0 599 Călin-Ioan Cazacu
Daniel Tepša 665 4.0		0.0 605 Petruț Ovidiu Mihalcioiu
Alen Kujundžić 685 4.0		0.0 624 Bogdan Tudorie
Mateja Tadić ( (substituted on) 61 Želislav Jakab) 614 2.5		1.5 613 Vlad-George Sabău
Robert Ernješi 650 3.0		1.0 618 Florin Opinca

Alba Aréna, Székesfehérvár

=== Group B ===
		Pts	Matches			Team points		Set points		Qualification
Rank	Team	Pts	W	D	L	W	L	W	L	Qualification
1	Austria	6	3	0	0	20	4	53.5	18.5	Advance to quarterfinals
2	Hungary (H)	4	2	0	1	17	7	46.5	25.5	Advance to quarterfinals
3	Italy	2	1	0	2	11	13	34	38	
4	Denmark	0	0	0	3	0	24	10	62	

30 May 2025
08:00 CEST

Austria	8 – 0	Denmark
3852 21.0	Report	3.0 3327
Thomas Langbauer 634 2.0		2.0 559 Claes Folmer Hansen
Martin Rathmayer 674 4.0		0.0 535 Brian Kisum
Lukas Temistokle 629 4.0		0.0 555 Martin Folmer Hansen
Markus Vsetecka 622 3.0		1.0 556 Jonas Winding Soskov
( (substituted on) 61 Matthias Zatschkowitsch) Martin Janits 642 4.0		0.0 565 Kasper Holdgaard Juul Kisum
( (substituted on) 61 Philipp Vsetecka) Lukas Huber 651 4.0		0.0 557 Peter Stig Andersen

Alba Aréna, Székesfehérvár

30 May 2025
15:20 CEST

Hungary	7 – 1	Italy
3730 18.5	Report	5.5 3517
Károly Kozma 680 4.0		0.0 602 Andreas Dalvai
Zsombor Zapletán 625 3.0		1.0 592 Alex Posch
Zoltan Flavius Fehér 574 1.0		3.0 610 Armin Egger
János Brancsek 623 3.0		1.0 581 Georg Plaickner
Zoltán Móricz 640 3.5		0.5 580 Christoph Hainz ( (substituted on) 61 Daniel Prinoth)
Zoltán Horváth 588 4.0		0.0 552 Christian Mair

Alba Aréna, Székesfehérvár

1 June 2025
15:20 CEST

Hungary	8 – 0	Denmark
3769 21.0	Report	3.0 3263
Levente Kakuk 645 4.0		0.0 534 Martin Folmer Hansen
Zsolt Pákai 657 4.0		0.0 519 Kasper Holdgaard Juul Kisum ( (substituted on) 31 Brian Kisum)
Norbert Kiss 664 4.0		0.0 546 Casper Rasmussen
Ádám Farkas 592 3.0		1.0 565 Jonas Winding Soskov
( (substituted on) 61 Zoltán Horváth) Zoltán Flavius Fehér 598 2.0		2.0 553 Claes Folmer Hansen
( (substituted on) 61 Károly Kozma) Zsombor Zapletán 613 4.0		0.0 546 Peter Stig Andersen

Alba Aréna, Székesfehérvár

1 June 2025
19:00 CEST

Italy	2 – 6	Austria
3579 8.5	Report	15.5 3768
Julian Piazzi 581 0.0		4.0 661 Philipp Vsetecka
Daniel Prinoth 617 2.0		2.0 613 Matthias Zatschkowitsch
( (substituted on) 61 Christian Mair, (substituted on) 101 Christoph Hainz) Alex Posch 555 1.0		3.0 636 Lukas Huber
Georg Plaickner 615 2.0		2.0 630 Martin Janits
Armin Egger 599 2.0		2.0 595 Thomas Langbauer ( (substituted on) 61 Markus Vsetecka)
Andreas Dalvai 612 1.5		2.5 633 Lukas Temistokle ( (substituted on) 61 Martin Rathmayer)

Alba Aréna, Székesfehérvár

3 June 2025
08:00 CEST

Denmark	0 – 8	Italy
3310 4.0	Report	20.0 3577
( (substituted on) 61 Brian Kisum) Kasper Holdgaard Juul Kisum 528 0.5		3.5 571 Andreas Dalvai
Martin Folmer Hansen 553 1.0		3.0 588 Christoph Hainz ( (substituted on) 61 Julian Piazzi)
Jonas Winding Soskov 544 0.5		3.5 601 Alex Posch
Casper Rasmussen 580 1.0		3.0 656 Armin Egger
Peter Stig Andersen 534 0.0		4.0 581 Georg Plaickner
Claes Folmer Hansen 571 1.0		3.0 580 Daniel Prinoth

Alba Aréna, Székesfehérvár

3 June 2025
15:20 CEST

Austria	6–2	Hungary
3824 17.0	Report	7.0 3685
Philipp Vsetecka 610 1.0		3.0 648 Zsombor Zapletán
Martin Rathmayer 652 3.0		1.0 623 Norbert Kiss
Lukas Temistokle 681 3.0		1.0 600 Zoltán Móricz
Martin Janits 634 4.0		0.0 583 Zsolt Pákai
Lukas Huber 648 4.0		0.0 586 Károly Kozma ( (substituted on) 61 Ádám Farkas)
Matthias Zatschkowitsch 599 2.0		2.0 645 János Brancsek

Alba Aréna, Székesfehérvár

=== Group C ===
		Pts	Matches			Team points		Set points		Qualification
Rank	Team	Pts	W	D	L	W	L	W	L	Qualification
1	Germany	6	3	0	0	21	3	51.5	20.5	Advance to quarterfinals
2	Slovakia	4	2	0	1	14	10	46	26	Advance to quarterfinals
3	Slovenia	2	1	0	2	12	12	36	36	
4	Sweden	0	0	0	3	1	23	10.5	61.5	

30 May 2025
08:00 CEST

Germany	8 – 0	Sweden
3776 24.0	Report	0.0 3304
Daniel Barth 642 4.0		0.0 543 Patrik Rasin
Manuel Lallinger 620 4.0		0.0 568 Juha Sahlman
Mario Nüßlein 611 4.0		0.0 556 Johannes Wiklund
( (substituted on) 61 Christian Wilke) Lukas Funk 633 4.0		0.0 590 Niklas Persson
( (substituted on) 61 Tim Brachtel) Jürgen Pointinger 633 4.0		0.0 522 Peter Barkenskiöld
Jan Sandler 637 4.0		0.0 525 Thomas Park Karlsson

Alba Aréna, Székesfehérvár

30 May 2025
19:00 CEST

Slovakia	5 – 3	Slovenia
3777 14.0	Report	10.0 3757
Rostislav Gorecký 649 2.0		2.0 670 Aleš Blaz
Marcel Ivančík 669 3.0		1.0 603 Kristjan Mijatović
Erik Kuna 631 2.0		2.0 637 Matej Lepej
Šimon Magala 614 3.0		1.0 575 Gašper Burkeljca ( (substituted on) 61 Blaž Čerin)
( (substituted on) 80 Tibor Varga) Jan Bína 583 1.0		3.0 666 Žiga Požar
Ivan Čech 631 3.0		1.0 606 Miko Steržaj

Alba Aréna, Székesfehérvár

1 June 2025
11:40 CEST

Slovakia	8 – 0	Sweden
3722 21.0	Report	3.0 3253
Jan Bína 616 4.0		0.0 538 Patrik Rasin
Róbert Kluka 575 2.0		2.0 519 Johannes Wiklund
Tibor Varga 596 3.0		1.0 553 Hakan Stromberg
Rostislav Gorecký 654 4.0		0.0 565 Juha Sahlman
( (substituted on) 61 Marcel Ivančík) Šimon Magala 622 4.0		0.0 554 Niklas Persson
Erik Kuna 659 4.0		0.0 524 Thomas Park Karlsson

Alba Aréna, Székesfehérvár

1 June 2025
15:20 CEST

Slovenia	2 – 6	Germany
3690 9.5	Report	14.5 3783
Miko Steržaj 638 3.0		1.0 637 Daniel Barth
Aleš Blaz 621 0.0		4.0 666 Christian Wilke
Kristjan Mijatović 621 3.0		1.0 603 Jan Sandler ( (substituted on) 91 Lukas Funk)
Matej Lepej 620 1.5		2.5 625 Manuel Lallinger
( (substituted on) 61 Gregor Bajželj) Blaž Čerin 582 1.0		3.0 616 Jürgen Pointinger
( (substituted on) 61 Primož Kastaneto) Žiga Požar 608 1.0		3.0 636 Tim Brachtel

Alba Aréna, Székesfehérvár

3 June 2025
08:00 CEST

Sweden	1 – 7	Slovenia
3190 7.5	Report	16.5 3601
Thomas Park Karlsson 549 3.0		1.0 562 Gašper Burkeljca
Patrik Rasin 525 1.5		2.5 588 Blaž Čerin
Niklas Persson 558 1.0		3.0 591 Gregor Bajželj
Johannes Wiklund 510 0.0		4.0 650 Primož Kaštaneto
Håkan Strömberg 527 1.0		3.0 598 Miko Steržaj
Peter Barkenskiöld 521 1.0		3.0 612 Žiga Požar

Alba Aréna, Székesfehérvár

3 June 2025
19:00 CEST

Germany	7 – 1	Slovakia
3840 13.0	Report	11.0 3775
Christian Wilke 669 3.0		1.0 629 Rostislav Gorecký
Daniel Barth 625 2.0		2.0 624 Jan Bína
Manuel Lallinger 640 2.0		2.0 638 Marcel Ivančík
Lukas Funk 655 2.0		2.0 652 Erik Kuna
( (substituted on) 61 Mario Nüßlein) Tim Brachtel 628 2.0		2.0 604 Šimon Magala ( (substituted on) 61 Tibor Varga)
( (substituted on) 91 Jan Sandler) Jürgen Pointinger 623 2.0		2.0 628 Ivan Čech

Alba Aréna, Székesfehérvár

=== Group D ===
		Pts	Matches			Team points		Set points		Qualification
Rank	Team	Pts	W	D	L	W	L	W	L	Qualification
1	Czechia	6	3	0	0	19.5	4.5	49	23	Advance to quarterfinals
2	North Macedonia	4	2	0	1	14	10	36	36	Advance to quarterfinals
3	Croatia	2	1	0	2	11.5	12.5	36	36	
4	France	0	0	0	3	3	21	23	49	

30 May 2025
11:40 CEST

Croatia	6 – 2	France
3694 15.0	Report	9.0 3566
Ivan Totić 630 3.0		1.0 626 Frédéric Koell
( (substituted on) 61 Pere Petrić) Ivan Petrić 561 1.0		3.0 603 Gianni Della Martire
Bojan Vlakevski 679 4.0		0.0 574 Corentin Rauscher
Luka Bolanča 625 3.0		1.0 577 Enzo Kempf
Andrej Kovač 602 2.0		2.0 608 Kévin Vincent
( (substituted on) 61 Dario Prađeno) Mihael Grivičić 597 2.0		2.0 578 Jérome Livera

Alba Aréna, Székesfehérvár

30 May 2025
19:00 CEST

Czechia	6 – 2	North Macedonia
3856 15.0	Report	9.0 3636
Milan Svoboda 684 4.0		0.0 556 Damir Fučkar
Milan Blecha 627 3.0		1.0 584 Dimitar Dimitrovski
Petr Dobeš 639 3.0		1.0 620 Saso Trpkovski
Jan Mecerod 634 1.0		3.0 610 Boris Benedik
( (substituted on) 61 Zdenek Ransdorf) Jaroslav Hažva 588 0.0		4.0 662 Uroš Stoklas
Michal Pytlík 684 4.0		0.0 604 Mladen Donkovski

Alba Aréna, Székesfehérvár

1 June 2025
08:00 CEST

Czechia	8 – 0	France
3727 19.0	Report	5.0 3532
Jaroslav Hažva 623 4.0		0.0 591 Frédéric Koell
Jan Mecerod 647 3.0		1.0 589 Gianni Della Martire
Petr Dobeš 603 4.0		0.0 564 Jérome Livera
Zdenek Ransdorf 632 2.0		2.0 605 Enzo Kempf
Petr Hendrych 609 3.0		1.0 586 Ludovic Rousselet
( (substituted on) 61 Milan Blecha) Michal Pytlík 613 3.0		1.0 597 Kévin Vincent

Alba Aréna, Székesfehérvár

1 June 2025
11:40 CEST

North Macedonia	5 – 3	Croatia
3709 12.0	Report	12.0 3630
Saso Trpkovski 636 0.0		4.0 660 Bojan Vlakevski
Mladen Donkovski 589 1.0		3.0 613 Luka Požega
Nikola Andonovski 581 1.0		3.0 609 Ivan Totić
Boris Benedik 638 3.0		1.0 574 Mihael Grivičić ( (substituted on) 61 Pere Petrić)
Dimitar Dimitrovski 648 4.0		0.0 602 Andrej Kovač
Uroš Stoklas 617 3.0		1.0 572 Dario Prađeno

Alba Aréna, Székesfehérvár

3 June 2025
11:40 CEST

France	1 – 7	North Macedonia
3542 9.0	Report	15.0 3660
Frédéric Koell 597 2.0		2.0 624 Sašo Trpkovski
Gianni Della Martire 618 2.0		2.0 627 Mladen Donkovski
Corentin Rauscher 603 2.0		2.0 586 Nikola Andonovski
Enzo Kempf 566 1.0		3.0 616 Boris Benedik
Ludovic Rousselet 571 1.0		3.0 597 Dimitar Dimitrovski ( (substituted on) 91 Duško Ajdin)
Kevin Vincent 587 1.0		3.0 610 Uroš Stoklas

Alba Aréna, Székesfehérvár

3 June 2025
19:00 CEST

Croatia	2.5 – 5.5	Czechia
3677 9.0	Report	15.0 3721
Andrej Kovač 581 0.0		4.0 616 Jaroslav Hažva
Ivan Totić 633 3.0		1.0 616 Milan Svoboda
Nikola Muše 608 2.0		2.0 608 Milan Blecha ( (substituted on) 31 Petr Hendrych)
Ivan Petrić 642 2.0		2.0 614 Jan Mecerod
Bojan Vlakevski 610 1.0		3.0 647 Michal Pytlík
Luka Požega 603 1.0		3.0 620 Zdeněk Ransdorf

Alba Aréna, Székesfehérvár

== Final Round ==
=== Bracket ===
Quarterfinals
A1	Serbia	6
C2	Slovakia	2
B1	Austria	7
D2	North Macedonia	1
C1	Germany	8
A2	Poland	0
D1	Czechia	2
B2	Hungary	6

Semifinals
Serbia	5
Austria	3
Germany	7
Hungary	1

Final
Serbia	6
Germany	2

=== Quarterfinals ===
5 June 2025
10:00 CEST

Serbia	6 – 2	Slovakia
3802 14.5	Report	9.5 3675
Danijel Tepša 604 2.5		1.5 580 Ivan Čech ( (substituted on) 61 Tibor Varga)
Vilmoš Zavarko 665 3.5		0.5 613 Rostislav Gorecký
Alen Kujundžić 705 2.5		1.5 641 Erik Kuna
( (substituted on) 91 Mateja Tadić) Robert Ernješi 613 1.0		3.0 640 Šimon Magala
Čongor Baranj 628 3.0		1.0 609 Ján Bína
Igor Kovačić 587 2.0		2.0 592 Marcel Ivančík

Alba Aréna, Székesfehérvár

5 June 2025
12:30 CEST

Austria	7 – 1	North Macedonia
3866 15.0	Report	9.0 3676
Philipp Vsetecka 664 3.0		1.0 630 Sašo Trpkovski
Martin Rathmayer 659 2.0		2.0 626 Mladen Donkovski
Martin Janits 610 3.0		1.0 577 Nikola Andonovski
Lukas Huber 657 2.0		2.0 623 Boris Benedik
Lukas Temistokle 650 4.0		0.0 596 Dimitar Dimitrovski
Matthias Zatschkowitsch 599 1.0		3.0 624 Uroš Stoklas

Alba Aréna, Székesfehérvár

5 June 2025
15:00 CEST

Germany	8 – 0	Poland
3857 21.0	Report	3.0 3537
Tim Brachtel 665 4.0		0.0 590 Bartosz Krug
Daniel Barth 666 4.0		0.0 609 Mateusz Goździk
Manuel Lallinger 665 4.0		0.0 582 Dawid Strzelczak
( (substituted on) 61 Lukas Funk) Christian Wilke 598 3.0		1.0 585 Jakub Kuryło
Timo Hoffmann 624 3.0		1.0 587 Tomasz Masłowski
Jürgen Pointinger 639 3.0		1.0 584 Jakub Cwojdziński

Alba Aréna, Székesfehérvár

5 June 2025
17:30 CEST

Czechia	2 – 6	Hungary
3660 9.0	Report	15.0 3723
Jan Mecerod 604 1.0		3.0 640 Károly Kozma
Milan Svoboda 608 2.0		2.0 619 Zoltán Móricz
Petr Dobeš 579 0.0		4.0 610 Zsombor Zapletán
Jaroslav Hažva 635 2.0		2.0 620 Levente Kakuk
Michal Pytlík 614 2.0		2.0 629 Norbert Kiss
Zdeněk Ransdorf 620 2.0		2.0 605 János Brancsek ( (substituted on) 84 Zoltán Horváth)

Alba Aréna, Székesfehérvár

=== Semifinals ===
6 June 2025
15:00 CEST

Serbia	5 – 3	Austria
3854 15.0	Report	9.0 3825
Alen Kujundžić 664 1.0		3.0 696 Philipp Vsetecka
Mateja Tadić 625 1.0		3.0 642 Martin Rathmayer
Vilmoš Zavarko 668 4.0		0.0 628 Martin Janits
Čongor Baranj 675 4.0		0.0 616 Lukas Huber
( (substituted on) 61 Daniel Tepša) Igor Kovačić 595 2.0		2.0 633 Lukas Temistokle
Robert Ernješi 627 3.0		1.0 610 Matthias Zatschkowitsch

Alba Aréna, Székesfehérvár

6 June 2025
17:30 CEST

Germany	7 – 1	Hungary
3943 17.0	Report	7.0 3733
Tim Brachtel 644 2.0		2.0 626 Zsombor Zapletán
Daniel Barth 650 4.0		0.0 601 Károly Kozma
Manuel Lallinger 678 2.0		2.0 669 Zoltán Móricz
Lukas Funk 599 1.0		3.0 646 Norbert Kiss
( (substituted on) 61 Mario Nüßlein) Jürgen Pointinger 701 4.0		0.0 581 Zoltán Flavius Fehér
( (substituted on) 91 Jan Sandler) Christian Wilke 671 4.0		0.0 610 Zoltán Horváth

Alba Aréna, Székesfehérvár

=== Final ===
7 June 2025
13:30 CEST

Serbia	6 – 2	Germany
3913 12.5	Report	11.5 3808
Alen Kujundžić 691 3.0		1.0 640 Tim Brachtel
Mateja Tadić 674 3.0		1.0 621 Daniel Barth
Vilmoš Zavarko 688 2.5		1.5 629 Manuel Lallinger
( (substituted on) 116 Želislav Jakab) Čongor Baranj 657 2.0		2.0 650 Christian Wilke
Daniel Tepša 590 0.0		4.0 633 Jürgen Pointinger
( (substituted on) 118 Radovan Vlajkov) Robert Ernješi 613 2.0		2.0 635 Mario Nüßlein

Alba Aréna, Székesfehérvár

== Final standing ==
Rank	Team
1st place, gold medalist(s)	Serbia
2nd place, silver medalist(s)	Germany
3rd place, bronze medalist(s)	Austria
3rd place, bronze medalist(s)	Hungary
5-8	Czechia
5-8	North Macedonia
5-8	Poland
5-8	Slovakia
9-12	Croatia
9-12	Italy
9-12	Romania
9-12	Slovenia
13-16	Denmark
13-16	Estonia
13-16	France
13-16	Sweden

2025 Men's World Champions

Serbia
7th title

Team roster: Čongor Baranj, Robert Ernješi, Želislav Jakab, Igor Kovačić, Alen Kujundžić, Mateja Tadić, Daniel Tepša, Radovan Vlajkov, Vilmoš Zavarko
Head coach: Vilmoš Zavarko
