= 2018 World Singles Ninepin Bowling Classic Championships – Men's sprint =

Men's sprint at the 2018 World Single Ninepin Bowling Classic Championships
- Location: Cluj-Napoca, Romania
- Dates: 23 May 2018
- Competitors: 32 from 16 nations

Medalists
gold medal	Vilmoš Zavarko	Serbia
silver medal	Axel Schondelmaier	Germany
bronze medal	Wolfgang Blaas	Italy
bronze medal	Nicolae Lupu	Romania

The men's sprint event at the 2018 World Singles Ninepin Bowling Classic Championships was held in Cluj-Napoca, Romania on 23 May 2018.

The title of world champion was successfully defended by Serbian Vilmoš Zavarko, who defeated German Axel Schondelmaier in the final. Bronze medals went to semi-finalists Italian Wolfgang Blass and representative of the hosts - Romanian Nicolae Lupu.

== Results ==
=== Starting places ===
The starting places have been allocated on the basis of each team's achievements during the previous championships.

	(Austria) AUT	(Bosnia and Herzegovina) BIH	(Croatia) CRO	(Czech Republic) CZE	(Denmark) DEN	(Estonia) EST	(France) FRA	(Germany) GER	(Hungary) HUN	(Italy) ITA	(North Macedonia) MKD	(Poland) POL	(Romania) ROU	(Slovenia) SLO	(Serbia) SRB	(Slovakia) SVK	Total
Number of seeds	1	1	2	2	1	1	2	1	1	1	1	2	3	3	3	3	32

=== Draw ===
The players were drawn into pairs with the reservation that competitors from the same country can not play in the first round against each other.

Round of 32
(Hungary) Tamás Kiss	0
(Austria) Philipp Vsetecka	2
(Germany) Timo Hoffmann	2
(Slovenia) Gregor Bajželj	0
(Austria) Lukas Huber	0
(Poland) Michał Szulc	2
(Slovenia) Matej Lepej	1	18
(Italy) Wolfgang Blaas	1	19
(Czech Republic) Jan Bína	1	21
(Slovakia) Tomas Pasiak	1	17
(France) Georges Ungurean	2
(Estonia) Markko Abel	0
(Serbia) Vilmoš Zavarko	1	21
(Slovakia) Peter Nemček	1	14
(Croatia) Hrvoje Marinović	1	42
(Romania) Horatiu Bogdan Dudas	1	40
(Hungary) Zsombor Zapletán	2
(Slovenia) Franci Velišček	0
(North Macedonia) Boris Benedik	1	24
(Slovakia) Erik Kuna	1	18
(Romania) Nicolae Lupu	2
(Denmark) Henning Bo Poulsen	0	DNS
(Croatia) Ivan Totić	2
(Serbia) Robert Ernješi	0
(Czech Republic) Jiří Veselý	1	22
(Poland) Bartosz Krug	1	23
(Romania) Petruţ Ovidiu Mihălcioiu	1	21
(Bosnia and Herzegovina) Nemanja Galić	1	18
(Germany) Axel Schondelmaier	2
(France) Guillaume Changenet	0
(Serbia) Igor Kovačić	0
(Germany) Jürgen Pointinger	2

Round of 16
(Austria) Philipp Vsetecka	1	23
(Germany) Timo Hoffmann	1	19
(Poland) Michał Szulc	1	18
(Italy) Wolfgang Blaas	1	21
(Czech Republic) Jan Bína	2
(France) Georges Ungurean	0
(Serbia) Vilmoš Zavarko	2
(Croatia) Hrvoje Marinović	0
(Hungary) Zsombor Zapletán	2
(North Macedonia) Boris Benedik	0
(Romania) Nicolae Lupu	1	19
(Croatia) Ivan Totić	1	16
(Poland) Bartosz Krug	0
(Romania) Petruţ Ovidiu Mihălcioiu	2
(Germany) Axel Schondelmaier	1	25
(Germany) Jürgen Pointinger	1	24

Quarterfinals
(Austria) Philipp Vsetecka	1	17
(Italy) Wolfgang Blaas	1	22
(Czech Republic) Jan Bína	0
(Serbia) Vilmoš Zavarko	2
(Hungary) Zsombor Zapletán	0
(Romania) Nicolae Lupu	2
(Romania) Petruţ Ovidiu Mihălcioiu	1	16
(Germany) Axel Schondelmaier	1	22

Semifinals
(Italy) Wolfgang Blaas	0
(Serbia) Vilmoš Zavarko	2
(Romania) Nicolae Lupu	0
(Germany) Axel Schonderlmaier	2

Final
(Serbia) Vilmoš Zavarko	2
(Germany) Axel Schonderlmaier	0
