= 2023 World Team Ninepin Bowling Classic Championships – Men's tournament =

Tournament details
- Host country: Croatia
- City: Varaždin
- Venue: 1 (in 1 host city)
- Dates: 17-28 May
- Teams: 17

Final positions
- Champions: Austria (1st title)
- Runners-up: Germany
- Third place: Croatia; Serbia

Tournament statistics
- Matches played: 35
- Top scorers: Player: (Germany) Tim Brachtel 712; Team: Austria 4076

The men's tournament at the 2023 World Team Ninepin Bowling Classic Championships was held in Varaždin, Croatia, from 17 to 28 May 2023.

Austria captured their first title by defeating Germans 6-2 in the final match. Bronze medals were secured by semifinalists Serbians and hosting Croats.

== Participating teams ==
17 associations applied to participate in the men's teams competition.

- Austria
- Bosnia and Herzegovina
- Croatia
- Czech Republic
- Estonia
- France
- Germany
- Hungary
- North Macedonia
- Poland
- Romania
- Serbia
- Slovakia
- Slovenia
- Sweden

=== Draw ===
Groups were drawn on October 30, 2022, during the conference in Rosice.

Pot 1	Pot 2	Pot 3	Pot 4
Austria; Croatia (hosts); Germany; Serbia	Czech Republic; Hungary; Poland; Slovakia	Bosnia and Herzegovina; North Macedonia; Romania; Slovenia	Denmark; Estonia; France; Italy; Sweden

=== Groups ===
Group A	Group B	Group C	Group D
Germany; Hungary; Bosnia and Herzegovina; Sweden; Italy	Serbia; Czech Republic; North Macedonia; Denmark	Austria; Slovakia; Slovenia; Estonia	Croatia (hosts); Poland; Romania; France

== Group stage ==
=== Group A ===
		Pts	Matches			Team points		Set points		Qualification
Rank	Team	Pts	W	D	L	W	L	W	L	Qualification
1	Germany	8	4	0	0	26	6	70	26	Advance to quarterfinals
2	Hungary	6	3	0	1	20	12	54	42	Advance to quarterfinals
3	Bosnia and Herzegovina	4	2	0	2	17.5	14.5	59.5	36.5	
4	Italy	2	1	0	3	14.5	17.5	46	50	
5	Sweden	0	0	0	4	2	30	10.5	85.5	

17 May 2023
17:30 CEST

Italy	2.5 - 5.5	Bosnia and Herzegovina
3578 9.0	Report	15.0 3625
Oswald Kofler 586 1.0		3.0 600 Senad Jogunčić
Christian Mair 0.0 559		4.0 602 Muamer Bešić
Tamás Kiss 624 2.0		2.0 624 Nermin Hrustemović
( (substituted on) 61 Michael Ladurner) Christoph Hainz 551 0.0		4.0 592 Nemanja Galić
Armin Egger 649 3.0		1.0 605 Marko Trklja
Aaron Peer Pratzer 609 3.0		1.0 602 Pere Petrić

Varaždin Arena, Varaždin

17 May 2023
17:30 CEST

Sweden	2 - 6	Hungary
3217 6.0	Report	18.0 3705
Per-Erik Andersson 469 0.0		4.0 590 Balázs Rudolf
Juha Sahlman 604 3.0		1.0 600 Zsombor Zapletán
Patrik Rasin 489 0.0		4.0 592 Zoltán Horváth
Frederik Nilsson 600 2.0		2.0 589 László Karsai ( (substituted on) 61 Richárd Danóczy)
Peter Barkenskiöld 535 1.0		3.0 597 Levente Kakuk ( (substituted on) 61 Károly Kozma)
Tomislav Lovrić 520 0.0		4.0 637 Zoltán Móricz

Varaždin Arena, Varaždin

18 May 2023
09:30 CEST

Sweden	0 - 8	Italy
3162 3.0	Report	21.0 3734
Patrik Rasin 488 0.0		4.0 602 Oswald Kofler
Per-Erik Andersson 473 0.0		4.0 612 Georg Plaickner
Juha Sahlman 530 0.0		4.0 669 Armin Egger
Tomislav Lorvić 567 1.0		3.0 601 Aaron Peer Pratzer
Frederik Nilsson 567 0.0		4.0 593 Tamás Kiss
Peter Barkenskiöld 537 2.0		2.0 557 Christoph Hainz

Varaždin Arena, Varaždin

18 May 2023
09:30 CEST

Bosnia and Herzegovina	1 - 7	Germany
3565 9.0	Report	15.0 3871
Nermin Kasumović 565 0.0		4.0 676 Christian Wilke
Muamer Bešić 575 1.0		3.0 647 Daniel Barth
Dragan Sukalo 647 4.0		0.0 611 Manuel Weiß
( (substituted on) 61 Đorđe Mandić) Nermin Hrustemović 554 1.0		3.0 673 Mario Nüßlein
Nemanja Galić 608 1.0		3.0 635 Jürgern Pointinger
( (substituted on) 61 Marko Trklja) Pere Petrić 616 2.0		2.0 629 Tim Brachtel

Varaždin Arena, Varaždin

20 May 2023
18:00 CEST

Germany	8 - 0	Sweden
3931 24.0	Report	0.0 3031
Manuel Weiß 639 4.0		0.0 388 Yngve Hansson
Lukas Funk 666 4.0		0.0 501 Peter Barkenskiöld
Tim Brachtel 712 4.0		0.0 539 Tomislav Lovrić
Daniel Barth 626 4.0		0.0 531 Juha Sahlman
Jürgen Pointinger 661 4.0		0.0 587 Frederik Nilsson
Timo Hoffmann 627 4.0		0.0 485 Patrik Rasin

Varaždin Arena, Varaždin

20 May 2023
15:20 CEST

Hungary	6 - 2	Italy
3812 17.0	Report	7.0 3593
Zoltán Horváth 617 2.0		2.0 629 Armin Egger
Levente Kakuk 660 2.0		2.0 666 Tamás Kiss
Zsombor Zapletán 641 3.0		1.0 590 Aaron Peer Prazter
( (substituted on) 61 Zoltan Flavius Fehér) Balázs Rudolf 612 2.0		2.0 566 Christian Mair
László Karsai 623 4.0		0.0 560 Georg Plaickner ( (substituted on) 31 Michael Ladurner)
Zoltán Móricz 659 4.0		0.0 582 Oswald Kofler

Varaždin Arena, Varaždin

22 May 2023
11:40 CEST

Hungary	5 - 3	Bosnia and Herzegovina
3685 11.0	Report	13.0 3675
Zoltan Flavius Fehér 635 1.0		3.0 628 Nermin Hrustemović
Levente Kakuk 641 2.0		2.0 616 Muamer Bešić
Zsombor Zapletán 625 3.0		1.0 587 Nemanja Galić
( (substituted on) 61 Richárd Danóczy) Balázs Rudolf 552 1.0		3.0 601 Dragan Sukalo
Károly Kozma 614 3.0		1.0 602 Marko Trklja
Zoltán Móricz ( (substituted on) 31 Zoltán Horváth) 618 1.0		3.0 641 Pere Petrić

Varaždin Arena, Varaždin

22 May 2023
15:20 CEST

Italy	2 - 6	Germany
3690 9.0	Report	15.0 3838
( (substituted on) 61 Christian Mair) Christoph Hainz 570 0.0		4.0 622 Manuel Weiß
Tamas Kiss 671 3.0		1.0 617 Mario Nüßlein
Armin Egger 656 3.0		1.0 635 Lukas Funk
Aaron Peer Prazter 592 1.0		3.0 679 Daniel Barth
Oswald Kofler 609 2.0		2.0 620 Timo Hoffmann
Michael Ladurner 592 0.0		4.0 665 Christian Wilke

Varaždin Arena, Varaždin

24 May 2023
08:00 CEST

Bosnia and Herzegovina	8 - 0	Sweden
3655 22.5	Report	1.5 3182
Muamer Bešić 591 4.0		0.0 441 Per-Erik Andersson ( (substituted on) 61 Yngve Hansson)
Senad Jogunčić 608 4.0		0.0 531 Patrik Rasin
Nermin Hrustemović 648 3.5		0.5 558 Peter Barkenskiöld
Đorđe Mandić 556 3.0		0.0 529 Tomislav Lovrić
Pere Petrić 610 4.0		0.0 554 Fredrik Nilsson
Dragan Sukalo 642 4.0		0.0 569 Juha Sahlman

Varaždin Arena, Varaždin

24 May 2023
19:00 CEST

Germany	5 - 3	Hungary
3923 16.0	Report	8.0 3837
Christian Wilke 633 2.0		2.0 645 Zoltan Flavius Fehér
Tim Brachtel 700 4.0		0.0 645 Zoltán Horváth
Mario Nüßlein 637 2.0		2.0 640 Zsombor Zapletán
Lukas Funk 648 2.0		2.0 669 Zoltán Móricz
Jürgen Pointinger 680 2.0		2.0 660 Levente Kakuk
Timo Hoffmann 625 4.0		0.0 578 László Karsai

Varaždin Arena, Varaždin

=== Group B ===
		Pts	Matches			Team points		Set points		Qualification
Rank	Team	Pts	W	D	L	W	L	W	L	Qualification
1	Serbia	6	3	0	0	20	4	51.5	20.5	Advance to quarterfinals
2	Czech Republic	4	2	0	3	15	25	46	74	Advance to quarterfinals
3	North Macedonia	2	1	0	2	13	11	38.5	33.5	
4	Denmark	0	0	0	1	0	8	8	16	

20 May 2023
08:00 CEST

Serbia	8 - 0	Denmark
3834 21.0	Report	3.0 3210
Daniel Tepša 605 3.0		1.0 532 Martin Folmer Hansen ( (substituted on) 61 Mikkel Schnell Jensen)
Radovan Vlajkov 650 4.0		0.0 533 Brian Kisum
Vilmoš Zavarko 672 4.0		0.0 516 Casper Rasmussen
Igor Kovačić 700 4.0		0.0 553 Frank Nielsen
( (substituted on) 61 Bojan Kličarić) Čongor Baranj 634 4.0		0.0 518 Kasper Holdgård Juul Kisum
( (substituted on) 61 Aleksandar Milinković) Adrijan Lončarević 573 2.0		2.0 558 Claes Folmer Hansen

Varaždin Arena, Varaždin

20 May 2023
11:40 CEST

Czech Republic	6 - 2	North Macedonia
3840 16.0	Report	8.0 3674
Jan Bína 647 3.0		1.0 606 Damir Fučkar ( (substituted on) 35 Duško Ajdin)
Milan Blecha 625 2.0		2.0 626 Dimitar Dimitrovski
Milan Svoboda 668 3.0		1.0 609 Boris Benedik
Rostislav Gorecký 639 3.0		1.0 599 Mladen Donkovski
Zdeněk Ransdorf 613 1.0		3.0 646 Uroš Stoklas
Jaroslav Hažva 648 4.0		0.0 588 Ibrahim Memedi

Varaždin Arena, Varaždin

22 May 2023
08:00 CEST

Czech Republic	8 - 0	Denmark
3840 22.0	Report	2.0 3311
Jaroslav Hažva 668 4.0		0.0 584 Brian Kisum
Milan Blecha 630 4.0		0.0 540 Kasper Holdgård Juul Kisum
Petr Dobeš 595 3.0		1.0 529 Mikkel Schnell Jensen
Jan Bína 679 4.0		0.0 586 Frank Nielsen
Tomáš Cabák 619 4.0		0.0 516 Casper Rasmussen
Zdeněk Ransdorf 649 3.0		1.0 566 Claes Folmer Hansen

Varaždin Arena, Varaždin

22 May 2023
19:00 CEST

North Macedonia	3 - 5	Serbia
3714 9.5	Report	14.5 3929
Saso Trpkovski 626 2.0		2.0 614 Daniel Tepša
Dimitar Dimitrovski 582 0.0		4.0 692 Vilmoš Zavarko
Duško Ajdin 574 0.0		4.0 688 Robert Ernješi
Mladen Donkovski 694 3.5		0.5 670 Igor Kovačić
Boris Benedik 633 2.0		2.0 625 Radovan Vlajkov
Uroš Stoklas 605 2.0		2.0 640 Čongor Baranj

Varaždin Arena, Varaždin

24 May 2023
11:40 CEST

Denmark	0 - 8	North Macedonia
3372 3.0	Report	21.0 3694
( (substituted on) 49 Casper Rasmussen) Brian Kisum 580 1.0		3.0 593 Saso Trpkovski
Kasper Holdgård Juul Kisum 596 1.0		3.0 653 Mladen Donkovski
Frank Nielsen 543 0.0		4.0 637 Uroš Stoklas
Mikkel Schnell Jensen 552 0.0		4.0 625 Boris Benedik
Claes Folmer Hansen 544 0.0		4.0 597 Darko Dimitrovski
Martin Folmer Hansen 557 1.0		3.0 589 Dimitar Dimitrovski ( (substituted on) 61 Duško Ajdin)

Varaždin Arena, Varaždin

24 May 2023
19:00 CEST

Serbia	7 - 1	Czech Republic
3883 16.0		8.0 3638
Igor Kovačić 662 2.5		1.5 641 Jan Bína
Robert Ernješi 672 4.0		0.0 566 Milan Blecha ( (substituted on) 61 Tomáš Cabák)
Vilmoš Zavarko 696 4.0		0.0 589 Milan Svoboda
Bojan Kličarić 596 0.5		3.5 657 Rostislav Gorecký
( (substituted on) 61 Ilija Jevremović) Čongor Baranj 631 3.0		1.0 585 Zdeněk Ransdorf
( (substituted on) 61 Aleksandar Milinković) Radovan Vlajkov 626 2.0		2.0 600 Petr Dobeš

Varaždin Arena, Varaždin

=== Group C ===
		Pts	Matches			Team points		Set points		Qualification
Rank	Team	Pts	W	D	L	W	L	W	L	Qualification
1	Austria	6	3	0	0	20	4	49.5	22.5	Advance to quarterfinals
2	Slovakia	4	2	0	1	15	9	39.5	32.5	Advance to quarterfinals
3	Slovenia	2	1	0	2	11	13	36	36	
4	Estonia	0	0	0	3	2	22	19	53	

20 May 2023
11:40 CEST

Austria	8 - 0	Estonia
3793 20.0	Report	4.0 3421
Philipp Vsetecka 643 3.0		1.0 613 Markko Abel
Martin Rathmayer 629 4.0		0.0 516 Allar Maaring
Markus Vsetecka 645 3.0		1.0 611 Kaido Kirs
Lukas Temistokle 647 4.0		0.0 573 Marko Muts
( (substituted on) 61 Lukas Huber) Martin Janits 631 1.0		1.0 545 Urmas Lembla
Roman Gradenitsch 598 3.0		1.0 563 Marek Sööt

Varaždin Arena, Varaždin

20 May 2023
19:00 CEST

Slovakia	7 - 1	Slovenia
3769 17.0	Report	7.0 3641
Daniel Pažitný 617 3.0		1.0 595 Kristjan Mijatović
Marcel Ivančík 646 4.0		0.0 611 Miko Steržaj
Erik Kuna 633 1.0		3.0 646 Matej Lepej
Martin Kozák 634 3.0		1.0 635 Igor Ćosić
Bystrík Vadovič 618 3.0		1.0 595 Janže Lužan
Peter Nemček 621 3.0		1.0 559 Blaž Čerin ( (substituted on) 61 Anej Krajnc)

Varaždin Arena, Varaždin

22 May 2023
08:00 CEST

Slovakia	6 - 2	Estonia
3632 14.0	Report	10.0 3475
Daniel Pažitný 597 2.0		2.0 595 Marko Muts
Erik Kuna 663 4.0		0.0 523 Allar Maaring
Martin Kozák 630 3.0		1.0 592 Markko Abel
( (substituted on) 61 Bystrík Vadovič) Peter Nemček 567 0.0		4.0 622 Raul Rebane
Boris Šintál 560 2.0		2.0 572 Gert Piksar
Marcel Ivančík 615 3.0		1.0 571 Urmas Lemba

Varaždin Arena, Varaždin

22 May 2023
19:00 CEST

Slovenia	2 - 6	Austria
3853 10.0	Report	14.0 3901
Franci Velišček 654 2.0		2.0 629 Matthias Zatschkowitsch
Gašper Kragelj 619 1.0		3.0 627 Martin Rathmayer
Matej Lepej 653 1.0		3.0 675 Philipp Vsetecka
( (substituted on) 61 Anej Krajnc) Igor Ćosić 590 1.0		3.0 645 Lukas Temistokle
Janže Lužan 650 2.0		2.0 687 Lukas Huber
Kristjan Mijatović 687 3.0		1.0 638 Martin Janits

Varaždin Arena, Varaždin

24 May 2023
11:40 CEST

Estonia	0 - 8	Slovenia
3488 5.0	Report	19.0 3832
Gert Piksar 591 0.0		4.0 657 Franci Velišček
Markko Abel 604 2.0		2.0 637 Gašper Kragelj
Marek Sööt 598 1.0		3.0 662 Kristjan Mijatović
Kaido Kirs 556 1.0		3.0 602 Anej Krajnc
Raul Rebane 577 0.0		4.0 660 Miko Steržaj
Urmas Lembla 562 1.0		3.0 614 Blaž Čerin

Varaždin Arena, Varaždin

24 May 2023
11:40 CEST

Austria	6 - 2	Slovakia
3851 15.5	Report	8.5 3729
Markus Vsetecka 637 1.5		2.5 633 Daniel Pažitný
Martin Rathmayer 671 3.0		1.0 639 Marcel Ivančík
Philipp Vsetecka 658 3.0		1.0 650 Erik Kuna
Lukas Temistokle 632 3.0		1.0 574 Martin Kozák
( (substituted on) 61 Roman Gerdenitsch) Lukas Huber 634 4.0		0.0 578 Bystrik Vadovič ( (substituted on) 61 Boris Šintál)
Matthias Zatschkowitsch 619 1.0		3.0 655 Peter Nemček

Varaždin Arena, Varaždin

=== Group D ===
		Pts	Matches			Team points		Set points		Qualification
Rank	Team	Pts	W	D	L	W	L	W	L	Qualification
1	Croatia (H)	6	3	0	0	21	3	54.5	17.5	Advance to quarterfinals
2	Romania	4	2	0	0	14	2	39	9	Advance to quarterfinals
3	Poland	1	0	1	2	7	17	29	43	
4	France	1	0	1	2	6	18	21.5	50.5	

20 May 2023
15:20 CEST

Croatia	7 - 1	France
3864 21.0	Report	3.0 3569
Alen Kujundžić 638 4.0		0.0 604 Enzo Kempf
Luka Bolanča 660 4.0		0.0 586 Gianni Della Martire
Branko Manev 629 4.0		0.0 555 Cyril Hugele
Hroje Marinović 664 3.0		1.0 616 Corentin Rauscher
( (substituted on) 61 Matija Mance) Bojan Vlakevski 639 4.0		0.0 564 Ludovic Rousselet
( (substituted on) 61 Nikola Muše) Ivan Totić 634 2.0		2.0 644 Frédéric Koell

Varaždin Arena, Varaždin

20 May 2023
19:00 CEST

Poland	2 - 6	Romania
3646 9.0	Report	15.0 3760
Bartosz Krug 583 0.0		4.0 644 Horatiu Bogdan Dudas
Michał Szulc 648 3.0		1.0 623 Ion Cercel
Mateusz Klecha 548 0.0		4.0 642 Petrut Ovidiu Mihalcioiu
Tomasz Masłowski 603 1.0		3.0 623 Vlad-George Sabau
Sebastian Piosik 596 2.0		2.0 605 Bogdan Tudorie
Jakub Kuryło 668 3.0		1.0 623 Robert Merza

Varaždin Arena, Varaždin

22 May 2023
11:40 CEST

Poland	4 - 4	France
3658 12.5	Report	11.5 3660
Sebastian Piosik 577 1.0		3.0 600 Gianni Della Martire
Michał Szulc 647 3.0		1.0 577 Corentin Rauscher
Bartosz Krug 630 3.5		0.5 600 Ludovic Rousselet
Tomasz Masłowski 612 2.0		2.0 609 Enzo Kempf
Jakub Kuryło 624 3.0		1.0 608 Anthony Rabier
Gracjan Machaj 568 0.0		4.0 666 Frédéric Koell

Varaždin Arena, Varaždin

22 May 2023
15:20 CEST

Romania	1 - 7	Croatia
3646 7.0	Report	17.0 3871
Horatiu Bogdan Dudas 619 2.0		2.0 631 Bojan Vlakevski
Bogdan Tudorie 621 1.0		3.0 673 Branko Manev
Ion Cercel 623 2.0		2.0 616 Alen Kujundžić
Robert Merza 599 0.0		4.0 694 Hrvoje Marinović
( (substituted on) 61 Roberto Daniel Laposi) Petrut Ovidiu Mihalcioiu 618 1.0		3.0 640 Luka Bolanča ( (substituted on) 61 Nikola Muše)
( (substituted on) 61 Florin Opinca) Vlad-George Sabau 566 1.0		3.0 617 Luka Požega

Varaždin Arena, Varaždin

24 May 2023
08:00 CEST

France	1 - 7	Romania
3587 7.0	Report	17.0 3752
Frédéric Koell 633 1.0		3.0 653 Horatiu Bogdan Dudas
Corentin Rauscher 618 2.0		2.0 583 Ion Cercel
( (substituted on) 40 Anthony Rabier) Ludovic Rousselet 565 0.0		4.0 634 Robert Merza
Enzo Kempf 614 1.0		3.0 624 Bogdan Tudorie
Gianni Della Martire 575 1.0		3.0 647 Petrut Ovidiu Mihalcioiu
Cyril Hugele 582 2.0		2.0 611 Vlad-George Sabau

Varaždin Arena, Varaždin

24 May 2023
15:20 CEST

Croatia	7 - 1	Poland
3875 16.5	Report	7.5 3633
Ivan Totić 623 1.0		3.0 666 Michał Szulc
Bojan Vlakevski 702 4.0		0.0 631 Jakub Kuryło
Hrvoje Marinović 643 2.0		2.0 628 Bartosz Krug
Nikola Muše 661 3.0		1.0 584 Tomasz Masłowski
Alen Kujundžić 655 3.0		1.0 620 Sebastian Piosik
( (substituted on) 91 Borna Bakran) Matija Mance 591 3.5		0.5 504 Mateusz Klecha ( (substituted on) 31 Gracjan Machaj)

Varaždin Arena, Varaždin

== Final Round ==
=== Bracket ===
Quarterfinals
A1	Germany	7
C2	Slovakia	1
B1	Serbia	7
D2	Romania	1
C1	Austria	5
A2	Hungary	3
D1	Croatia	7
B2	Czech Republic	1

Semifinals
Germany	6
Serbia	2
Austria	4	13.5
Croatia	4	10.5

Final
Germany	2
Austria	6

=== Quarterfinals ===
26 May 2023
10:00 CEST

Germany	7 - 1	Slovakia
3985 17.0	Report	7.0 3708
Tim Brachtel 675 4.0		0.0 604 Marcel Ivančík
Manuel Weiß 617 0.0		4.0 672 Erik Kuna
Christian Wilke 667 3.0		1.0 616 Maroš Ležovič
( (substituted on) 61 Mario Nüßlein) Jürgen Pointinger 678 3.0		1.0 595 Bystrik Vadovič
Timo Hoffmann 662 4.0		0.0 591 Boris Šintál
( (substituted on) 91 Lukas Funk) Daniel Barth 686 3.0		1.0 630 Martin Kozák

Varaždin Arena, Varaždin

26 May 2023
12:30 CEST

Serbia	7 - 1	Romania
3811 15.0	Report	9.0 3724
Vilmoš Zavarko 677 3.0		1.0 651 Bogdan Tudorie
Robert Ernješi 650 2.0		2.0 624 Horatiu Bogdan Dudas
Igor Kovačić 648 4.0		0.0 624 Ion Cercel
Radovan Vlajkov 623 2.0		2.0 622 Robert Merza ( (substituted on) 34 Petrut Ovidiu Mihalcioiu)
( (substituted on) 61 Aleksandar Milinković) Daniel Tepša 575 0.0		4.0 632 Vlad-Georg Sabau
Adrijan Lončarević 638 4.0		0.0 571 Stefan Romeo Balan

Varaždin Arena, Varaždin

26 May 2023
15:00 CEST

Croatia	7 - 1	Czech Republic
3885 11.0	Report	13.0 3846
Bojan Vlakevski 649 3.0		1.0 622 Milan Blecha
Alen Kujundžić 656 2.0		2.0 631 Rostislav Gorecký
Branko Manev 661 2.0		2.0 651 Milan Svoboda
Luka Bolanča 624 0.0		4.0 676 Jan Bína
Hrvoje Marinović 659 2.0		2.0 648 Jaroslav Hažva
Ivan Totić 636 2.0		2.0 618 Zdeněk Ransdorf

Varaždin Arena, Varaždin

26 May 2023
17:30 CEST

Austria	5 - 3	Hungary
3931 13.0	Report	11.0 3873
Martin Rathmayer 660 3.0		1.0 624 Zoltán Horváth
Lukas Huber 671 2.0		2.0 664 Zsombor Zapletán
Matthias Zatschkowitsch 652 2.0		2.0 654 Levente Kakuk ( (substituted on) 93 Balázs Rudolf)
Philipp Vsetecka 634 0.0		4.0 686 Zoltán Móricz
Lukas Temistokle 636 2.0		2.0 642 Zoltan Flavius Fehér
Martin Janits 678 4.0		0.0 603 Károly Kozma

Varaždin Arena, Varaždin

=== Semifinals ===
27 May 2023
14:25 CEST

Austria	4 - 4	Croatia
3924 13.5	Report	10.5 3903
Matthias Zatschkowitsch 654 1.5		2.5 657 Branko Manev
Martin Rathmayer 628 2.0		2.0 633 Nikola Muše
Lukas Huber 708 4.0		0.0 652 Alen Kujundžić
Martin Janits 623 2.0		2.0 609 Luka Bolanča
Philipp Vsetecka 660 2.0		2.0 683 Hrvoje Marinović
Lukas Temistokle 651 2.0		2.0 669 Bojan Vlakevski

Varaždin Arena, Varaždin

27 May 2023
16:55 CEST

Germany	6 - 2	Serbia
3963 14.5	Report	9.5 3929
Christian Wilke 686 3.0		1.0 653 Igor Kovačić
Tim Brachtel 680 3.0		1.0 664 Radovan Vlajkov
Daniel Barth 632 1.0		3.0 687 Vilmoš Zavarko
Jürgen Pointinger 652 3.0		1.0 641 Čongor Baranj
Timo Hoffmann 664 2.5		1.5 625 Robert Ernješi
Mario Nüßlein 649 2.0		2.0 659 Adrijan Lončarević

Varaždin Arena, Varaždin

=== Final ===
28 May 2023
14:00 CEST

Germany	2 - 6	Austria
4004 10.5	Report	13.5 4076
Christian Wilke 694 3.0		1.0 705 Martin Janits
Tim Brachtel 679 2.0		2.0 658 Martin Rathmayer
Daniel Barth 664 2.0		2.0 678 Lukas Huber
Jürgern Pointinger 683 1.0		3.0 704 Matthias Zatschkowitsch
Timo Hoffmann 647 2.0		2.0 667 Philipp Vsetecka
( (substituted on) 80 Lukas Funk) Mario Nüßlein 637 0.5		3.5 664 Lukas Temistokle

Varaždin Arena, Varaždin

== Final standing ==
Rank	Team
1st place, gold medalist(s)	Austria
2nd place, silver medalist(s)	Germany
3rd place, bronze medalist(s)	Croatia
3rd place, bronze medalist(s)	Serbia
5-8	Czech Republic
5-8	Hungary
5-8	Romania
5-8	Slovakia
9-12	Bosnia and Herzegovina
9-12	North Macedonia
9-12	Poland
9-12	Slovenia
13-16	Denmark
13-16	Estonia
13-16	France
13-16	Italy
17	Sweden

2023 Men's World Champions

Austria
1st title

Team roster: Roman Gerdenitsch, Lukas Huber, Martin Janits, Martin Rathmayer, Lukas Temistokle, Markus Vsetecka, Philipp Vsetecka, Matthias Zatschkowitsch
Head coach: Gerhard Pracser
