= 2017 World Team Ninepin Bowling Classic Championships – Men's tournament =

Tournament details
- Host country: Germany
- City: Dettenheim
- Venue: 1 (in 1 host city)
- Dates: 21–27 May
- Teams: 15

Final positions
- Champions: Serbia (4th title)
- Runners-up: Hungary
- Third place: Germany; Slovakia

Tournament statistics
- Matches played: 28
- Top scorer: (Serbia) Igor Kovačić 718

The men's tournament at the 2017 World Team Ninepin Bowling Classic Championships was held in Dettenheim, Germany from 21 to 27 May 2017.

Serbia captured their fourth title by defeating Hungary 6-2 in the final match. Bronze medals was secured by Slovakia and host Germany.

== Participating teams ==
- Austria
- Bosnia and Herzegovina
- Croatia
- Czech Republic
- Denmark
- Estonia
- France
- Germany
- Hungary
- Italy
- Poland
- Romania
- Serbia
- Slovakia
- Slovenia

=== Draw ===
| Pot 1 | Pot 2 | Pot 3 | Pot 4 |
|---|---|---|---|
| Serbia; Austria; Germany (hosts); Hungary | Croatia; Romania; Czech Republic; Poland | Slovenia; Slovakia; Italy; France | Bosnia and Herzegovina; Estonia; Montenegro; Denmark |

=== Groups ===
| Group A | Group B | Group C | Group D |
|---|---|---|---|
| Germany (hosts); Romania; Slovenia; Estonia | Serbia; Poland; Slovakia; ~~Montenegro~~ (Note: The national team of Montenegro withdrew from participation in the championships. For this reason, only three teams were in group B. The third matches of each teams in the group stage were played with local players, but they did not count towards classification.) | Hungary; Czech Republic; France; Denmark | Austria; Croatia; Italy; Bosnia and Herzegovina |

== Group stage ==
=== Group A ===
| | | Pts | Matches | | | Team points | | Set points | | Qualification |
| Rank | Team | Pts | W | D | L | W | L | W | L | Qualification |
|---|---|---|---|---|---|---|---|---|---|---|
| 1 | Germany (H) | 6 | 3 | 0 | 0 | 20 | 4 | 49 | 23 | Quarterfinals |
| 2 | Slovenia | 4 | 2 | 0 | 1 | 17 | 7 | 45 | 27 | Quarterfinals |
| 3 | Romania | 2 | 1 | 0 | 2 | 11 | 13 | 34 | 38 | |
| 4 | Estonia | 0 | 0 | 0 | 3 | 0 | 24 | 16 | 56 | |

21 May 2017
15:00 CEST

| Romania | 2 - 6 | Slovenia |
|---|---|---|
| 3658 9.5 | Report | 14.5 3765 |
| Petrut Ovidiu Mihalcioiu 614 2.0 | | 2.0 609 Matej Lepej |
| ( (substituted on) 66 Robert Merza) Cosmin Craciun 602 1.0 | | 3.0 661 Aleš Blaž |
| Manel Manea 620 1.0 | | 3.0 659 Janže Lužan |
| Ion Cercel 612 1.0 | | 3.0 628 Uroš Stoklas |
| Nicolae Lupu 586 3.0 | | 1.0 574 Davor Sobočan ( (substituted on) 61 Jure Starman) |
| Horatiu Bogdan Dudas 624 1.5 | | 2.5 634 Primož Pintarič |

Liedolsheim Sport Hall, Dettenheim
Head referee: Hans Jesenko (AUT)

21 May 2017
18:30 CEST

| Germany | 8 - 0 | Estonia |
|---|---|---|
| 3793 18.5 | Report | 5.5 3417 |
| Axel Schondelmaier 656 4.0 | | 0.0 541 Raul Rebane |
| Mathias Weber 628 3.0 | | 1.0 617 Markko Abel |
| ( (substituted on) 61 Timo Hehl) Torsten Reiser 631 2.5 | | 1.5 552 Gert Piksar |
| Fabian Seitz 637 2.0 | | 2.0 617 Kaido Kirs |
| Thomas Schneider 620 3.0 | | 1.0 556 Raido Kuusk |
| Timo Hoffmann 621 4.0 | | 0.0 534 Urmas Lembla |

Liedolsheim Sport Hall, Dettenheim
Head referee: Hans Jesenko (AUT)

23 May 2017
08:00 CEST

| Slovenia | 3 - 5 | Germany |
|---|---|---|
| 3831 11.5 | Report | 12.5 3875 |
| Janže Lužan 637 2.0 | | 2.0 632 Mathias Weber |
| Primož Pintarič 678 3.0 | | 1.0 659 Torsten Reiser |
| Blaž Čerin 611 2.0 | | 2.0 612 Fabian Seitz |
| Aleš Blaž 648 2.0 | | 2.0 647 Axel Schondelmaier |
| Davor Sobočan 635 2.0 | | 2.0 643 Timo Hoffmann |
| Uroš Stoklas 622 0.5 | | 3.5 682 Thomas Schneider |

Liedolsheim Sport Hall, Dettenheim
Head referee: Hans Jesenko (AUT)

23 May 2017
11:30 CEST

| Estonia | 0 - 8 | Romania |
|---|---|---|
| 3412 5.5 | Report | 18.5 3773 |
| Markko Abel 595 1.0 | | 3.0 633 Nicolae Lupu |
| Gert Piksar 557 0.0 | | 4.0 653 Horatiu Bogdan Dudas |
| Kaido Kits 581 2.0 | | 2.0 595 Ion Cercel |
| Marek Sӧӧt 561 0.5 | | 3.5 613 Florin Opinca |
| Raido Kuusk 554 1.0 | | 3.0 652 Robert Merza |
| Marek Kivi 564 1.0 | | 3.0 627 Cosmin Craciun |

Liedolsheim Sport Hall, Dettenheim
Head referee: Hans Jesenko (AUT)

25 May 2017
15:00 CEST

| Slovenia | 8 - 0 | Estonia |
|---|---|---|
| 3724 19.0 | Report | 5.0 3355 |
| Davor Sobočan 607 3.0 | | 1.0 502 Marek Kivi |
| ( (substituted on) 61 Primož Pintarič ) Janže Lužan 628 3.0 | | 1.0 549 Urmas Lembla |
| Matej Lepej 641 3.0 | | 1.0 602 Markko Abel |
| Blaž Čerin 650 4.0 | | 0.0 578 Kaido Kirs |
| Jure Starman 596 3.0 | | 1.0 569 Raul Rebane |
| ( (substituted on) 61 Uroš Stoklas) Aleš Blaž 615 3.0 | | 1.0 555 Marek Sӧӧt |

Liedolsheim Sport Hall, Dettenheim
Head referee: Hans Jesenko (AUT)

25 May 2017
18:30 CEST

| Germany | 7 - 1 | Romania |
|---|---|---|
| 3950 18.0 | Report | 6.0 3694 |
| Mathias Weber 679 3.0 | | 1.0 634 Nicolae Lupu |
| Torsten Reiser 662 4.0 | | 0.0 622 Horatiu Bogdan Dudas |
| Timo Hehl 645 3.0 | | 1.0 576 Manel Manea ( (substituted on) 61 Ion Cercel) |
| Axel Schondelmaier 685 3.0 | | 1.0 630 Cosmin Craciun |
| Thomas Schneider 625 2.0 | | 2.0 631 Robert Merza |
| ( (substituted on) 61 Daniel Schmid) Timo Hoffmann 654 3.0 | | 1.0 601 Petrut Ovidiu Mihalcioiu |

Liedolsheim Sport Hall, Dettenheim
Head referee: Hans Jesenko (AUT)

=== Group B ===
| | | Pts | Matches | | | Team points | | Set points | | Qualification |
| Rank | Team | Pts | W | D | L | W | L | W | L | Qualification |
|---|---|---|---|---|---|---|---|---|---|---|
| 1 | Serbia | 4 | 2 | 0 | 0 | 13 | 3 | 29 | 19 | Quarterfinals |
| 2 | Slovakia | 2 | 1 | 0 | 1 | 10 | 6 | 29.5 | 18.5 | Quarterfinals |
| 3 | Poland | 0 | 0 | 0 | 2 | 1 | 15 | 13.5 | 34.5 | |

21 May 2017
15:00 CEST

| Poland | 0 - 8 | Slovakia |
|---|---|---|
| 3503 6.0 | Report | 18.0 3726 |
| Piotr Kieliba 579 2.0 | | 2.0 604 Bystrík Vadovič |
| Dawid Strzelczak 585 1.0 | | 3.0 604 Milan Tomka |
| Arkadiusz Stachecki 599 1.0 | | 3.0 611 Peter Nemček |
| Karol Sellmann 578 0.0 | | 4.0 645 Ivan Čech |
| Jarosław Bonk 585 1.0 | | 3.0 640 Tomáš Pašiak |
| Bartosz Krug 577 1.0 | | 3.0 622 Erik Kuna |

Liedolsheim Sport Hall, Dettenheim
Head referee: Hans Jesenko (AUT)

23 May 2017
08:00 CEST

| Slovakia | 2 - 6 | Serbia |
|---|---|---|
| 3775 11.5 | Report | 12.5 3788 |
| Martin Kozák 615 2.0 | | 2.0 645 Robert Ernješi |
| Tomáš Pašiak 619 2.0 | | 2.0 632 Čongor Baranj |
| Radoslav Foltin 591 2.0 | | 2.0 583 Uroš Jagličić ( (substituted on) 91 Miloš Simijonović) |
| Ivan Čech 647 3.0 | | 1.0 605 Danijel Tepša |
| Erik Kuna 679 1.5 | | 2.5 688 Vilmoš Zavarko |
| Peter Nemček 624 1.0 | | 3.0 635 Igor Kovačić |

Liedolsheim Sport Hall, Dettenheim
Head referee: Hans Jesenko (AUT)

25 May 2017
18:30 CEST

| Serbia | 7 - 1 | Poland |
|---|---|---|
| 3977 16.5 | Report | 7.5 3707 |
| Miloš Simijonović 676 3.0 | | 1.0 621 Arkadiusz Stachecki |
| Vilmoš Zavarko 674 3.5 | | 0.5 598 Dawid Strzelczak |
| Igor Kovačić 718 3.0 | | 1.0 632 Piotr Kieliba |
| Danijel Tepša 614 2.0 | | 2.0 630 Bartosz Krug |
| Robert Ernješi 663 2.0 | | 2.0 617 Mateusz Klecha |
| Čongor Baranj 663 3.0 | | 1.0 609 Jarosław Bonk |

Liedolsheim Sport Hall, Dettenheim
Head referee: Hans Jesenko (AUT)

=== Group C ===
| | | Pts | Matches | | | Team points | | Set points | | Qualification |
| Rank | Team | Pts | W | D | L | W | L | W | L | Qualification |
|---|---|---|---|---|---|---|---|---|---|---|
| 1 | Hungary | 6 | 3 | 0 | 0 | 20.5 | 3.5 | 48.5 | 23.5 | Quarterfinals |
| 2 | Czech Republic | 4 | 2 | 0 | 1 | 16.5 | 7.5 | 50.5 | 21.5 | Quarterfinals |
| 3 | France | 2 | 1 | 0 | 2 | 10 | 14 | 33.5 | 38.5 | |
| 4 | Denmark | 0 | 0 | 0 | 3 | 1 | 23 | 11.5 | 60.5 | |

21 May 2017
08:00 CEST

| Czech Republic | 7 - 1 | France |
|---|---|---|
| 3741 17.5 | Report | 6.5 3614 |
| Milan Svoboda 633 3.5 | | 0.5 594 Anthony Rabier |
| Radek Hejhal 574 1.0 | | 3.0 650 Julien Schmitt |
| Jaroslav Hažva 624 3.0 | | 1.0 659 Ludovic Rousselet ( (substituted on) 61 Kevin Vincent) |
| Pavel Jiroušek 634 3.0 | | 1.0 606 Gianni Della Martire |
| Miroslav Jelínek ( (substituted on) 68 Robin Parkan) 621 3.0 | | 1.0 626 Sylvian Brunot |
| Jiří Veselý 655 4.0 | | 0.0 634 Georges Ungurean |

Liedolsheim Sport Hall, Dettenheim
Head referee: Hans Jesenko (AUT)

21 May 2017
11:30 CEST

| Hungary | 8 - 0 | Denmark |
|---|---|---|
| 3876 20.5 | Report | 3.5 3298 |
| Levente Kakuk 625 3.5 | | 0.5 552 Finn Hjorth Madsen ( (substituted on) 61 Per Erik Andersson) |
| Zsombor Zapletán 664 3.0 | | 1.0 605 Theis Kyvsgård Jensen |
| Norbert Kiss 639 3.0 | | 1.0 557 Frank Nielsen |
| Gábor Kovács 641 3.0 | | 1.0 561 Daniel Host |
| ( (substituted on) 61 Sándor Farkas) László Karsai 651 4.0 | | 0.0 508 Mikkel Schnell Jensen |
| ( (substituted on) 61 Zoltan Flavius Fehér) Claudiu Boanta 656 4.0 | | 0.0 515 Jonas Jelle Winding |

Liedolsheim Sport Hall, Dettenheim
Head referee: Hans Jesenko (AUT)

23 May 2017
15:00 CEST

| France | 2 - 6 | Hungary |
|---|---|---|
| 3663 10.0 | Report | 14.0 3810 |
| Julien Schmitt 647 3.0 | | 1.0 674 Claudiu Boanta |
| Gianni Della Martire 594 2.0 | | 2.0 601 Levente Kakuk |
| Kevin Vincent 568 0.0 | | 4.0 617 János Brancsek |
| Emmanuel Nachin 586 0.0 | | 4.0 645 Zsombor Zapletán |
| Anthony Rabier 638 2.0 | | 2.0 660 Gabor Kovács |
| Georges Ungurean 630 3.0 | | 1.0 613 Norbert Kiss ( (substituted on) 61 Zoltan Flavius Fehér) |

Liedolsheim Sport Hall, Dettenheim
Head referee: Hans Jesenko (AUT)

23 May 2017
18:30 CEST

| Denmark | 0 - 8 | Czech Republic |
|---|---|---|
| 3267 1.0 | Report | 23.0 3783 |
| Jonas Jelle Winding 504 0.0 | | 4.0 613 Jan Bína |
| Theis Kyvsgård Jensen 593 1.0 | | 3.0 644 Radek Hejhal |
| Mikkel Schnell Jensen 560 0.0 | | 4.0 619 Robin Parkan |
| Daniel Host 536 0.0 | | 4.0 608 Jaroslav Hažva ( (substituted on) 61 Pavel Jiroušek) |
| Frank Nielsen 564 0.0 | | 4.0 640 Jiří Veselý |
| Per Erik Andersson 510 0.0 | | 4.0 659 Miroslav Jelínek |

Liedolsheim Sport Hall, Dettenheim
Head referee: Hans Jesenko (AUT)

25 May 2017
08:00 CEST

| France | 7 - 1 | Denmark |
|---|---|---|
| 3536 17.0 | Report | 7.0 3298 |
| Julien Schmitt 617 4.0 | | 0.0 565 Finn Hjorth Madsen |
| Gianni Della Martire 564 3.5 | | 0.5 512 Theis Kyvsgård Jensen ( (substituted on) 47 Per Erik Andersson) |
| Emmanuel Nachin 564 1.5 | | 2.5 557 Daniel Host |
| Kevin Vincent 559 2.0 | | 2.0 532 Jonas Jelle Winding |
| Ludovic Rousselet 591 2.0 | | 2.0 580 Frank Nielsen |
| Sylvain Brunot 641 4.0 | | 0.0 552 Mikkel Schnell Jensen |

Liedolsheim Sport Hall, Dettenheim
Head referee: Hans Jesenko (AUT)

25 May 2017
11:30 CEST

| Hungary | 6.5 - 1.5 | Czech Republic |
|---|---|---|
| 3267 1.0 | Report | 23.0 3783 |
| ( (substituted on) 61 Levente Kakuk) Sándor Farkas 609 2.0 | | 2.0 609 Milan Svoboda |
| Claudiu Boanta 655 2.0 | | 2.0 634 Jan Bína |
| László Karsai 644 2.0 | | 2.0 590 Jaroslav Hažva ( (substituted on) 61 Robin Parkan) |
| Zsombor Zapletán 646 4.0 | | 0.0 597 Pavel Jiroušek |
| Gabor Kovács 632 2.0 | | 2.0 611 Miroslav Jelínek ( (substituted on) 61 Radek Hejhal) |
| Norbert Kiss 674 2.0 | | 2.0 677 Jiří Veselý |

Liedolsheim Sport Hall, Dettenheim
Head referee: Hans Jesenko (AUT)

=== Group D ===
| | | Pts | Matches | | | Team points | | Set points | | Qualification |
| Rank | Team | Pts | W | D | L | W | L | W | L | Qualification |
|---|---|---|---|---|---|---|---|---|---|---|
| 1 | Austria | 6 | 3 | 0 | 0 | 18.5 | 5.5 | 46.5 | 25.5 | Quarterfinals |
| 2 | Croatia | 4 | 2 | 0 | 1 | 14 | 10 | 39 | 33 | Quarterfinals |
| 3 | Bosnia and Herzegovina | 1 | 0 | 1 | 2 | 8 | 16 | 32 | 40 | |
| 4 | Italy | 1 | 0 | 1 | 2 | 7.5 | 16.5 | 26.5 | 45.5 | |

21 May 2017
08:00 CEST

| Croatia | 5 - 3 | Italy |
|---|---|---|
| 3697 15.0 | Report | 9.0 3633 |
| Hrvoje Marinović 613 4.0 | | 0.0 544 Armin Schwienbacher ( (substituted on) 91 Aaron Peer Pratzer) |
| Matko Bulka 618 2.0 | | 2.0 642 Christian Mair |
| Nikola Muše 628 4.0 | | 0.0 598 Alex Posch |
| ( (substituted on) 61 Damir Ceković) Dario Radoš 586 0.5 | | 3.5 614 Wolfgang Blaas |
| Branko Manev 611 2.0 | | 2.0 615 Florian Thaler |
| Igor Šarkezi 641 2.5 | | 1.5 620 Armin Egger |

Liedolsheim Sport Hall, Dettenheim
Head referee: Hans Jesenko (AUT)

21 May 2017
11:30 CEST

| Austria | 5 - 3 | Bosnia and Herzegovina |
|---|---|---|
| 3733 13.5 | Report | 10.5 3709 |
| Philipp Vsetecka 640 2.0 | | 2.0 630 Darko Lotina |
| Martin Rathmayer 630 2.0 | | 2.0 653 Muamer Bešić |
| Reinhard Gruber 663 4.0 | | 0.0 590 Miodrag Trklja |
| ( (substituted on) 31 Matthias Zatschkowitsch) Jürgen Ertl 578 1.5 | | 2.5 603 Dinko Dundić |
| Martin Jantis 593 2.0 | | 2.0 607 Marko Trklja |
| Lukas Huber 629 2.0 | | 2.0 626 Ivan Petric |

Liedolsheim Sport Hall, Dettenheim
Head referee: Hans Jesenko (AUT)

23 May 2017
15:00 CEST

| Italy | 0.5 - 7.5 | Austria |
|---|---|---|
| 3536 6.0 | Report | 18.0 3765 |
| Wolfgang Blaas 611 1.0 | | 3.0 661 Philipp Vsetecka |
| Christian Mair 574 1.0 | | 3.0 616 Martin Rathmayer |
| Florian Thaler 575 1.0 | | 3.0 614 Reinhard Gruber |
| Armin Egger 620 2.0 | | 2.0 620 Christoph Essmeister |
| Aaron Peer Pratzer 597 1.0 | | 3.0 623 Martin Jantis |
| Hanes Krӧss 559 0.0 | | 4.0 631 Lukas Huber |

Liedolsheim Sport Hall, Dettenheim
Head referee: Hans Jesenko (AUT)

21 May 2017
11:30 CEST

| Bosnia and Herzegovina | 1 - 7 | Croatia |
|---|---|---|
| 3622 9.0 | Report | 15.0 3742 |
| Muamer Bešić 602 0.0 | | 4.0 665 Hrvoje Marinović |
| Darko Lotina 594 1.0 | | 3.0 621 Branko Manev |
| Dinko Dundić 601 1.0 | | 3.0 616 Matko Bulka |
| Nermin Hrustemović 563 1.0 | | 3.0 608 Nikola Muše |
| Ivan Petrić 601 2.0 | | 2.0 629 Luka Bolanča ( (substituted on) 61 Matija Mance) |
| Marko Trklja 661 4.0 | | 0.0 603 Igor Šarkezi ( (substituted on) 61 Ivan Totić) |

Liedolsheim Sport Hall, Dettenheim
Head referee: Hans Jesenko (AUT)

25 May 2017
08:00 CEST

| Italy | 4 - 4 | Bosnia and Herzegovina |
|---|---|---|
| 3662 11.5 | Report | 12.5 3629 |
| Florian Thaler 621 3.0 | | 1.0 591 Darko Lotina |
| Aaron Peer Pratzer 589 1.5 | | 2.5 589 Muamer Bešić |
| Alex Posch 623 2.0 | | 2.0 603 Miodrag Trklja |
| Wolfgang Blaas 624 1.5 | | 2.5 627 Dinko Dundić |
| Christian Mair ( (substituted on) 61 Armin Schwienbacher) 586 2.0 | | 2.0 603 Marko Trklja |
| Armin Egger 619 1.5 | | 2.5 616 Ivan Petrić |

Liedolsheim Sport Hall, Dettenheim
Head referee: Hans Jesenko (AUT)

25 May 2017
11:30 CEST

| Austria | 6 - 2 | Croatia |
|---|---|---|
| 3821 15.0 | Report | 9.0 3746 |
| Martin Rathmayer 640 3.0 | | 1.0 618 Luka Bolanča |
| Philipp Vsetecka 634 2.0 | | 2.0 645 Branko Manev |
| Martin Jantis 609 3.0 | | 1.0 597 Matko Bulka |
| Reinhard Gruber 685 3.0 | | 1.0 620 Nikola Muše |
| Matthias Zatschkowitsch 619 3.0 | | 1.0 607 Igor Šarkezi |
| Lukas Huber 634 1.0 | | 3.0 659 Hrvoje Marinović |

Liedolsheim Sport Hall, Dettenheim
Head referee: Hans Jesenko (AUT)

== Final Round ==
=== Bracket ===
Quarterfinals
A1 | Germany | 5 | -
C2 | Czech Republic | 3 | -
B1 | Serbia | 7 | -
D2 | Croatia | 1 | -
C1 | Hungary | 5 | -
A2 | Slovenia | 3 | -
D1 | Austria | 2 | -
B2 | Slovakia | 6 | -

Semifinals
Germany | 2 | -
Serbia | 6 | -
Hungary | 7 | -
Slovakia | 1 | -

Final
Serbia | 6 | -
Hungary | 2 | -

=== Quarterfinals ===
26 May 2017
08:00 CEST

| Germany | 5 - 3 | Czech Republic |
|---|---|---|
| 3866 12.0 | Report | 12.0 3819 |
| Matthias Weber 658 2.0 | | 2.0 667 Radek Hejhal |
| Torsten Reiser 636 3.0 | | 1.0 605 Jan Bína |
| Timo Hehl 643 2.0 | | 2.0 630 Pavel Jiroušek |
| Axel Schondelmaier 647 3.0 | | 1.0 626 Milan Svoboda |
| Timo Hoffmann 652 1.0 | | 3.0 671 Jiří Veselý |
| Thomas Schneider 630 1.0 | | 3.0 620 Miroslav Jelínek |

Liedolsheim Sport Hall, Dettenheim
Head referee: Hans Jesenko (AUT)

26 May 2017
11:30 CEST

| Serbia | 7 - 1 | Croatia |
|---|---|---|
| 3944 15.5 | Report | 8.5 3813 |
| Igor Kovačić 669 2.0 | | 2.0 656 Ivan Totić |
| Robert Ernješi 674 2.0 | | 2.0 658 Branko Manev |
| Miloš Simijonović 643 4.0 | | 0.0 578 Matija Mance |
| Čongor Baranj 645 3.0 | | 1.0 640 Igor Šarkezi |
| ( (substituted on) 61 Milan Jovetić) Radovan Vljakov 608 2.0 | | 2.0 632 Dario Radoš |
| Vilmoš Zavarko 705 2.5 | | 1.5 649 Hrvoje Marinović |

Liedolsheim Sport Hall, Dettenheim
Head referee: Hans Jesenko (AUT)

26 May 2017
15:00 CEST

| Hungary | 5 - 3 | Slovenia |
|---|---|---|
| 3923 14.0 | Report | 10.0 3841 |
| Levente Kakuk 640 2.0 | | 2.0 643 Uroš Stoklas |
| Claudiu Boanta 606 1.0 | | 3.0 654 Janže Lužan |
| Zoltan Flavius Fehér 671 4.0 | | 0.0 583 Matej Lepej |
| Zsombor Zapletán 662 3.0 | | 1.0 644 Blaž Čerin |
| Gábor Kovács 650 1.0 | | 3.0 677 Primož Pintarič |
| Norbert Kiss 694 3.0 | | 1.0 640 Aleš Blaž |

Liedolsheim Sport Hall, Dettenheim
Head referee: Hans Jesenko (AUT)

26 May 2017
18:30 CEST

| Austria | 2 - 6 | Slovakia |
|---|---|---|
| 3783 9.5 | Report | 14.5 3792 |
| Philipp Vsetecka 700 4.0 | | 0.0 619 Milan Tomka |
| Martin Rathmayer 639 2.0 | | 2.0 647 Bystrík Vadovič |
| Reinhard Gruber 657 2.0 | | 2.0 598 Peter Nemček |
| Martin Jantis 572 0.0 | | 4.0 658 Ivan Čech |
| Matthias Zatschkowitsch 587 1.0 | | 3.0 625 Tomáš Pašiak |
| Lukas Huber 628 0.5 | | 3.5 645 Erik Kuna |

Liedolsheim Sport Hall, Dettenheim
Head referee: Hans Jesenko (AUT)

=== Semifinals ===
27 May 2017
11:30 CEST

| Germany | 2 - 6 | Serbia |
|---|---|---|
| 3888 13.0 | Report | 11.0 4003 |
| Mathias Werber 663 2.0 | | 2.0 685 Igor Kovačić |
| Torsten Reiser 656 2.0 | | 2.0 687 Robert Ernješi |
| Timo Hehl 640 3.0 | | 1.0 615 Miloš Simijonović |
| Axel Schondelmaier 635 2.0 | | 2.0 661 Danijel Tepša |
| Timo Hoffmann 681 3.0 | | 1.0 668 Čongor Baranj |
| Thomas Schneider 613 1.0 | | 3.0 687 Vilmoš Zavarko |

Liedolsheim Sport Hall, Dettenheim
Head referee: Hans Jesenko (AUT)

27 May 2017
11:30 CEST

| Hungary | 7 - 1 | Slovakia |
|---|---|---|
| 3878 14.0 | Report | 10.0 3835 |
| ( (substituted on) 71 János Brancsek) Zoltan Flavius Fehér 593 0.0 | | 4.0 649 Milan Tomka |
| Levente Kakuk 683 4.0 | | 0.0 638 Bystrík Vadovič |
| Zsombor Zapletán 668 3.0 | | 1.0 658 Ivan Čech |
| László Karsai 653 3.0 | | 1.0 619 Peter Nemček |
| ( (substituted on) 91 Sándor Farkas) Gábor Kovács 621 2.0 | | 2.0 618 Tomáš Pašiak |
| Norbert Kiss 660 2.0 | | 2.0 653 Erik Kuna |

Liedolsheim Sport Hall, Dettenheim
Head referee: Hans Jesenko (AUT)

=== Final ===
27 May 2017
16:00 CEST

| Serbia | 6 - 2 | Hungary |
|---|---|---|
| 3982 12.0 | Report | 12.0 3861 |
| Igor Kovačić 653 1.0 | | 3.0 678 Levente Kakuk |
| Robert Ernješi 680 3.0 | | 1.0 615 Claudiu Boanta ( (substituted on) 91 Zoltan Flavius Fehér) |
| Danijel Tepša 680 2.0 | | 2.0 629 Zsombor Zapletán |
| Milan Jovetić 642 1.0 | | 3.0 653 László Karsai |
| Čongor Baranj 630 3.0 | | 1.0 614 Gábor Kovács |
| Vilmoš Zavarko 692 2.0 | | 2.0 672 Norbert Kiss |

Liedolsheim Sport Hall, Dettenheim
Head referee: Hans Jesenko (AUT)

== Final standing ==
| Rank | Team |
|---|---|
| 1st place, gold medalist(s) | Serbia |
| 2nd place, silver medalist(s) | Hungary |
| 3rd place, bronze medalist(s) | Germany |
| 3rd place, bronze medalist(s) | Slovakia |
| 5-8 | Austria |
| 5-8 | Croatia |
| 5-8 | Czech Republic |
| 5-8 | Slovenia |
| 9-12 | Bosnia and Herzegovina |
| 9-12 | France |
| 9-12 | Poland |
| 9-12 | Romania |
| 13-15 | Denmark |
| 13-15 | Estonia |
| 13-15 | Italy |
