= 2018 World Singles Ninepin Bowling Classic Championships – Men's single =

Men's single at the 2018 World Single Ninepin Bowling Classic Championships
- Location: Cluj-Napoca, Romania
- Dates: 21-22 May 2018 (Qualifying); 24-26 May 2018 (Knock-out phase)
- Competitors: 64 from 16 nations

Medalists
| gold medal | (Serbia) Vilmoš Zavarko |
| silver medal | (Germany) Manuel Weiß |
| bronze medal | (Czech Republic) Jan Bina |
| bronze medal | (Serbia) Igor Kovačić |

The men's single event at the 2018 World Singles Ninepin Bowling Classic Championships was held in Cluj-Napoca, Romania. Qualification took place on 21-22 May, while the knock-out phase from 24 May to 26 May 2018.

== Results ==
=== Qualification ===
32 players qualified for the knock-out phase.

| Rank | Name | Country | All | Clear off | Faults | Total | Notes |
|---|---|---|---|---|---|---|---|
| 1 | Timo Hoffmann | Germany | 411 | 282 | 0 | 693 | Q |
| 2 | Vilmoš Zavarko | Serbia | 442 | 240 | 1 | 682 | Q |
| 3 | Matej Lepej | Slovenia | 424 | 255 | 0 | 679 | Q |
| 4 | Tamás Kiss | Hungary | 406 | 268 | 0 | 674 | Q |
| 5 | Bojan Vlakevski | Macedonia | 406 | 254 | 0 | 660 | Q |
| 6 | Igor Kovačić | Serbia | 410 | 249 | 0 | 659 | Q |
| 7 | Robert Ernješi | Serbia | 434 | 223 | 0 | 657 | Q |
| 8 | Hrvoje Marinović | Croatia | 405 | 247 | 0 | 652 | Q |
| 9 | Levente Kakuk | Hungary | 410 | 239 | 0 | 649 | Q |
| 10 | Axel Schondelmaier | Germany | 407 | 236 | 0 | 643 | Q |
| 11 | Ion Cercel | Romania | 404 | 238 | 0 | 642 | Q |
| 12 | Károly Kozma | Hungary | 408 | 231 | 1 | 639 | Q |
| 13 | Manuel Weiß | Germany | 419 | 219 | 0 | 638 | Q |
| 14 | Jürgen Pointinger | Germany | 396 | 239 | 1 | 635 | Q |
| 15 | Flavius Zoltan Fehér | Hungary | 421 | 240 | 0 | 633 | Q |
| 16 | Jan Bína | Czech Republic | 404 | 228 | 1 | 632 | Q |
| 17 | Markus Vsetecka | Austria | 398 | 233 | 1 | 631 | Q |
| 18 | Nemanja Galić | Bosnia and Herzegovina | 400 | 230 | 1 | 630 | Q |
| 19 | Daniel Tepša | Serbia | 391 | 235 | 0 | 626 | Q |
| 20 | Michał Szulc | Poland | 407 | 219 | 0 | 626 | Q |
| 21 | Milan Jovetić | Serbia | 398 | 226 | 0 | 624 | Q |
| 22 | Mathias Weber | Germany | 400 | 223 | 0 | 623 | Q |
| 23 | Jan Endršt | Czech Republic | 407 | 216 | 0 | 623 | Q |
| 24 | Tomaš Pasiak | Slovakia | 422 | 201 | 2 | 623 | Q |
| 25 | Radovan Vlajkov | Serbia | 387 | 235 | 2 | 622 | Q |
| 26 | Franci Velišček | Slovenia | 392 | 229 | 1 | 621 | Q |
| 27 | Zsombor Zapletán | Hungary | 395 | 226 | 0 | 621 | Q |
| 28 | Mathias Dirnberger | Germany | 424 | 196 | 1 | 620 | Q |
| 29 | Lukas Huber | Austria | 380 | 238 | 0 | 618 | Q |
| 30 | Philipp Vsetecka | Austria | 403 | 215 | 1 | 618 | Q |
| 31 | Bartosz Krug | Poland | 386 | 224 | 0 | 610 | Q |
| 32 | Jiří Veselý | Czech Republic | 398 | 211 | 2 | 609 | Q |
| 33 | Piotr Kieliba | Poland | 376 | 231 | 1 | 607 | |
| 34 | Marko Trklja | Bosnia and Herzegovina | 382 | 222 | 0 | 604 | |
| 35 | László Karsai | Hungary | 383 | 219 | 2 | 602 | |
| 36 | Ivan Totić | Croatia | 390 | 211 | 2 | 601 | |
| 37 | Petruţ Ovidiu Mihălcioiu | Romania | 405 | 196 | 0 | 601 | |
| 38 | Erik Kuna | Slovakia | 397 | 203 | 1 | 600 | |
| 39 | Davor Sobočan | Slovenia | 399 | 200 | 3 | 599 | |
| 40 | Wolfgang Blaas | Italy | 384 | 214 | 1 | 598 | |
| 41 | Georg Righi | Italy | 389 | 209 | 1 | 598 | |
| 42 | Dario Radoš | Croatia | 389 | 207 | 1 | 596 | |
| 43 | Peter Nemček | Slovakia | 383 | 211 | 0 | 594 | |
| 44 | Gregor Bajželj | Slovenia | 393 | 197 | 2 | 590 | |
| 45 | Mihael Grivičić | Croatia | 388 | 200 | 3 | 588 | |
| 46 | Bystrík Vadovič | Slovakia | 392 | 196 | 2 | 588 | |
| 47 | Arkadiusz Stachecki | Poland | 373 | 214 | 2 | 587 | |
| 48 | Marko Jeličić | Croatia | 402 | 185 | 1 | 587 | |
| 49 | Armin Egger | Italy | 397 | 189 | 0 | 586 | |
| 50 | Ondřej Sobčák | Czech Republic | 397 | 185 | 1 | 582 | |
| 51 | Markko Abel | Estonia | 365 | 216 | 1 | 581 | |
| 52 | Nicolae Lupu | Romania | 380 | 201 | 1 | 581 | |
| 53 | Alexander Tischler | Austria | 363 | 216 | 1 | 579 | |
| 54 | Jürgen Ertl | Austria | 377 | 200 | 1 | 577 | |
| 55 | Guillaume Changenet | France | 379 | 197 | 4 | 576 | |
| 56 | Mario Liović | Croatia | 374 | 201 | 1 | 575 | |
| 57 | Martin Kozák | Slovakia | 381 | 194 | 4 | 575 | |
| 58 | Georges Ungurean | France | 364 | 207 | 1 | 571 | |
| 59 | Pavel Jiroušek | Czech Republic | 374 | 194 | 1 | 568 | |
| 60 | Đorđe Paštar | Bosnia and Herzegovina | 378 | 189 | 2 | 567 | |
| 61 | Henning Bo Poulsen | Denmark | 380 | 175 | 5 | 555 | |
| 62 | Filip Dejda | Czech Republic | 372 | 180 | 2 | 552 | |
| 63 | Marek Sööt | Estonia | 387 | 156 | 4 | 543 | |
| 64 | Peter Wiinberg Soerensen | Denmark | 371 | 171 | 5 | 542 | |

=== Finals ===
According to the results of the qualification, 32 players were put together in bouts, which took place on standard match rules - 4 sets of 30 throws. The competitor who obtains a larger number of sets wins. With an equal number of sets decides a higher total score.

Round of 32; 24 May
1 | (Germany) Timo Hoffmann | 1 | 651
32 | (Czech Republic) Jiří Veselý | 3 | 670
17 | (Austria) Markus Vsetecka | 0 | 603
16 | (Czech Republic) Jan Bína | 4 | 667
9 | (Hungary) Levente Kakuk | 4 | 686
24 | (Slovakia) Tomaš Pasiak | 0 | 574
25 | (Serbia) Radovan Vlajkov | 0 | 606
8 | (Croatia) Hrvoje Marinović | 4 | 696
5 | (North Macedonia) Bojan Vlakevski | 2 | 656
28 | (Germany) Mathias Dirnberger | 2 | 655
21 | (Serbia) Milan Jovetić | 1 | 619
12 | (Hungary) Károly Kozma | 3 | 630
13 | (Germany) Manuel Weiß | 2 | 666
20 | (Poland) Michał Szulc | 2 | 653
29 | (Austria) Lukas Huber | 3 | 669
4 | (Hungary) Tamás Kiss | 1 | 630
3 | (Slovenia) Matej Lepej | 1 | 605
30 | (Austria) Philipp Vsetecka | 3 | 604
19 | (Serbia) Daniel Tepša | 2 | 596
14 | (Germany) Jürgen Pointinger | 2 | 605
11 | (Romania) Ion Cercel | 3 | 620
22 | (Germany) Mathias Weber | 1 | 627
27 | (Hungary) Zsombor Zapletán | 1 | 602
6 | (Serbia) Igor Kovačić | 3 | 688
7 | (Serbia) Robert Ernješi | 3 | 638
26 | (Slovenia) Franci Velišček | 1 | 642
23 | (Czech Republic) Jan Endršt | 2 | 594
10 | (Germany) Axel Schondelmaier | 2 | 618
15 | (Hungary) Zoltan Flavius Fehér | 2 | 608
18 | (Bosnia and Herzegovina) Nemanja Galić | 2 | 600
31 | (Poland) Bartosz Krug | 0 | 604
2 | (Serbia) Vilmoš Zavarko | 4 | 696

Round of 16; 25 May
(Czech Republic) Jiří Veselý | 1 | 621
(Czech Republic) Jan Bína | 3 | 679
(Hungary) Levente Kakuk | 1 | 661
(Croatia) Hrvoje Marinović | 3 | 698
(North Macedonia) Bojan Vlakevski | 4 | 680
(Hungary) Károly Kozma | 0 | 604
(Germany) Manuel Weiß | 2,5 | 633
(Austria) Lukas Huber | 1,5 | 604
(Austria) Philipp Vsetecka | 3 | 672
(Germany) Jürgen Pointinger | 1 | 618
(Romania) Ion Cercel | 0 | 633
(Serbia) Igor Kovačić | 4 | 690
(Serbia) Robert Ernješi | 2 | 638
(Germany) Axel Schondelmaier | 2 | 648
(Hungary) Zoltan Flavius Fehér | 0 | 615
(Serbia) Vilmoš Zavarko | 4 | 687

Quarterfinals; 25 May
(Czech Republic) Jan Bína | 4 | 650
(Croatia) Hrvoje Marinović | 0 | 531
(North Macedonia) Bojan Vlakevski | 2 | 638
(Germany) Manuel Weiß | 2 | 659
(Austria) Philipp Vsetecka | 2 | 638
(Serbia) Igor Kovačić | 2 | 639
(Germany) Axel Schondelmaier | 0 | 566
(Serbia) Vilmoš Zavarko | 4 | 694

Semifinals; 26 May
(Czech Republic) Jan Bína | 0 | 584
(Germany) Manuel Weiß | 4 | 624
(Serbia) Igor Kovačić | 1 | 671
(Serbia) Vilmoš Zavarko | 3 | 678

Final; 26 May
(Germany) Manuel Weiß | 0,5 | 629
(Serbia) Vilmoš Zavarko | 3,5 | 695
