= Vilmoš Zavarko =

Serbian 9 pin bowling player (born 1988)

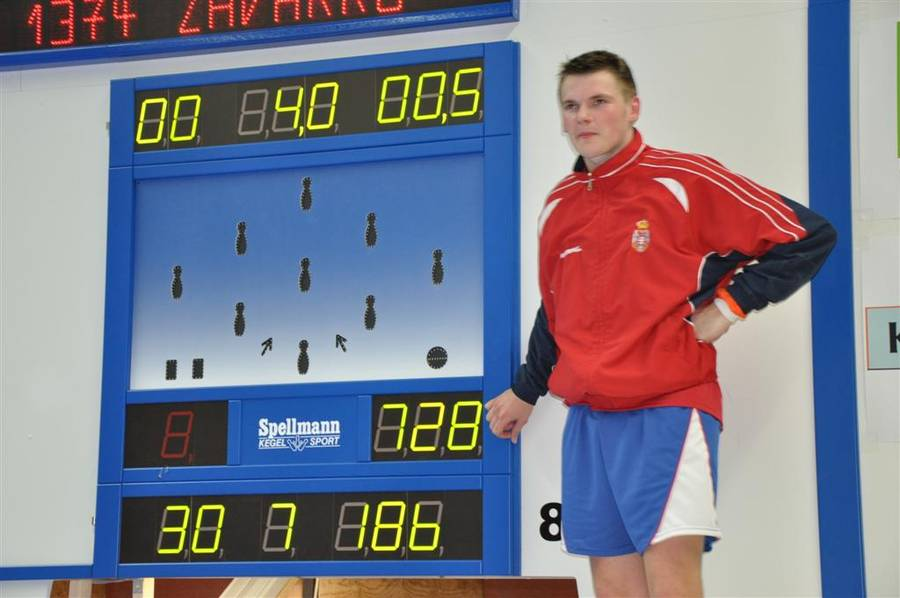
- Zavarko in 2009

Personal information
- Nationality: Serbian
- Born: March 14, 1988 (age 38) Bečej, Serbia

Sport
- Country: Serbia
- Sport: 9-pins
- Club: (Serbia and Montenegro) Univerzal Bečej (2000-2004) (Serbia and Montenegro) Vojvodina Bačko Gradište (2004-2006) (Hungary) Koszlog Kunferhertó (2006-2009) (Slovakia) ŽP Šport Podbrezová (2009-2019) (Italy) KK Neumarkt (2019- )

Achievements and titles
- Personal best: 120: 771 (St. Martin 2020)
Medal record
Men's 9-pins
Representing Serbia
Event	1st	2nd	3rd
World Championships	18	4	6
World Cup	2	2	0
U23 World Championships	7	1	1
U23 World Cup	1	0	0
U18 World Championships	2	0	0
Total	29	7	6
Event	1st	2nd	3rd
Single	8	2	1
Sprint	2	2	2
Combined	7	2	1
Team	8	1	3
Pair	2	0	0
Tandem	2	0	0
Mixed tandem	1	0	0
World Championships
Gold medal – first place	2008 Banja Luka	Mixed tandem
Gold medal – first place	2009 Dettenheim	Team
Gold medal – first place	2010 Ritzing	Single
Gold medal – first place	2010 Ritzing	Combined
Gold medal – first place	2011 Sarajevo	Team
Gold medal – first place	2012 Leszno	Combined
Gold medal – first place	2015 Speichersdorf	Team
Gold medal – first place	2016 Novigrad	Single
Gold medal – first place	2016 Novigrad	Sprint
Gold medal – first place	2017 Dettenheim	Team
Gold medal – first place	2018 Cluj-Napoca	Single
Gold medal – first place	2018 Cluj-Napoca	Sprint
Gold medal – first place	2018 Cluj-Napoca	Combined
Gold medal – first place	2019 Rokycany	Team
Gold medal – first place	2021 Tarnowo Podgórne	Team
Gold medal – first place	2022 Elva	Single
Gold medal – first place	2022 Elva	Combined
Gold medal – first place	2025 Székesfehérvár	Team
Silver medal – second place	2008 Banja Luka	Sprint
Silver medal – second place	2008 Banja Luka	Combined
Silver medal – second place	2010 Ritzing	Sprint
Silver medal – second place	2016 Novigrad	Combined
Bronze medal – third place	2012 Leszno	Single
Bronze medal – third place	2012 Leszno	Sprint
Bronze medal – third place	2013 Zalaegerszeg	Team
Bronze medal – third place	2014 Brno	Sprint
Bronze medal – third place	2014 Brno	Combined
Bronze medal – third place	2023 Varaždin	Team
World Cup
Gold medal – first place	2017 Straubing	Single
Gold medal – first place	2019 Přerov	Single
Silver medal – second place	2011 Tallinn	Single
Silver medal – second place	2015 Hirschau	Single
U23 World Championships
Gold medal – first place	2005 Náchod	Combined
Gold medal – first place	2005 Náchod	Pair
Gold medal – first place	2008 Zadar	Single
Gold medal – first place	2008 Zadar	Combined
Gold medal – first place	2008 Zadar	Pair
Gold medal – first place	2010 Rijeka	Tandem
Gold medal – first place	2010 Rijeka	Team
Silver medal – second place	2008 Zadar	Team
Bronze medal – third place	2005 Náchod	Team
U23 World Cup
Gold medal – first place	2009 Rijeka	Single
U18 World Championships
Gold medal – first place	2006 Sarajevo	Combined
Gold medal – first place	2006 Sarajevo	Tandem

Vilmoš Zavarko (born 14 March 1988 in Bečej) is a Serbian 9 pin bowling player who plays for Serbian national team and Italian club KK Neumarkt - Imperial Life since 2019.

Vilmoš Zavarko was the first player to bowl more than 700 pins at a World Championship and is currently considered the best classic bowler in the world. He is a multiple world champion, three times Champions League winner, winner of major tournaments, and holder of many records in the 120-throw system. His personal bests are unofficial world records. On February 8, 2020, during the Italian A1 League game against ASKC Passeier I - ITAS Walter, he scored 771 in 120 throws. On August 24, 2018, in Sandhausen in the tournament at distance of 200 throws he obtained the result of 1172.

For many years, he has also been the leader of the NBC world ranking and NBC Grand Prix.
