= 2022 World Singles Ninepin Bowling Classic Championships =

European bowling competition

8th World Singles Ninepin Bowling Classic Championships
- Host city: Elva
- Country: Estonia
- Nations: 15
- Athletes: 127
- Sport: 9-pins
- Events: 7
- Opening: May 24, 2022
- Closing: May 28, 2022
- Website: Facebook Official Site

Location in Europe
Location in Estonia

The 2022 World Singles Ninepin Bowling Classic Championships was the eighth edition of the world singles championships and held in Elva, Estonia, from 23 May to 28 May 2022.

Initially planned to take place in Tartu. However, the organizers, due to the preparation of new sports facilities, decided to replace Championships to Elva.

== Participants ==
Below is the list of countries who participated in the championships and the number of athletes places for each.

- Austria (10)
- Croatia (13)
- Czech Republic (12)
- Denmark (2)
- Estonia (4)
- France (5)
- Germany (12)
- Hungary (12)
- Italy (4)
- Poland (7)
- Romania (8)
- Serbia (12)
- Slovakia (11)
- Slovenia (12)
- Sweden (3)

== Schedule ==
Seven events will be held.

All times are local (UTC+3).

Date	Time	Event
23 May 2022	10:00	Single qualifications
24 May 2022	09:00	Single qualifications
24 May 2022	18:30	Mixed tandem 1. round
25 May 2022	09:00	Sprints 1. round
25 May 2022	13:15	Mixed tandem finals
25 May 2022	16:20	Sprints finals
26 May 2022	10:00	Single finals
27 May 2022	10:00	Single finals
28 May 2022	10:00	Single finals

== Medal summary ==
=== Medal table ===
* Host nation (Estonia)

Rank	Nation	Gold	Silver	Bronze	Total
1	Serbia (SRB)	2	0	1	3
2	Germany (GER)	1	2	6	9
3	Croatia (CRO)	1	1	1	3
4	Austria (AUT)	1	0	1	2
4	Romania (ROM)	1	0	1	2
6	Estonia (EST)*	1	0	0	1
7	Hungary (HUN)	0	3	0	3
8	Czech Republic (CZE)	0	1	0	1
9	France (FRA)	0	0	1	1
9	Slovenia (SLO)	0	0	1	1
Totals (10 entries)		7	7	12	26

=== Men ===
Event	Gold	Silver	Bronze
Single	Vilmoš Zavarko (SRB)	Alen Kujundžić (CRO)	Manuel Weiss (GER) Florian Fritzmann (GER)
Sprint	Matthias Zatschkowitsch (AUT)	Zsombor Zapletán (HUN)	Frédéric Koell (FRA) Bogdan Horatiu Dudas (ROU)
Combined	Vilmoš Zavarko (SRB)	Christian Wilke (GER)	Florian Fritzmann (GER)

=== Women ===
Event	Gold	Silver	Bronze
Single	Anna Müller (GER)	Boglarka Hari (HUN)	Jana-Sophie Bachert (GER) Yvonne Schneider (GER)
Sprint	Heret Ots (EST)	Hana Wiedermannová (CZE)	Jasmina Anđelković (SRB) Eva Sajko (SLO)
Combined	Luminita Viorica Dogaru (ROU)	Anna Müller (GER)	Jana-Sophie Bachert (GER)

=== Mixed ===
Event	Gold	Silver	Bronze
Mixed tandem	Nataša Ravnić; Hrvoje Marinović; Croatia	Edit Sass; Zoltán Móricz; Hungary	Fiona Steiner; Markus Vsetecka; Austria Venesa Bogdanović; Alen Kujundžić; Croatia
