= Norbert Kiss (bowler) =

Hungarian nine-pin bowling player

Personal information
- Nationality: Hungarian
- Born: June 29, 1980 (age 46) Kaposvár, Hungary

Sport
- Country: Hungary
- Sport: 9-pins
- Club: (Hungary) Kaposvári TK (?-2008) (Hungary) Szegedi TE (2008-2025) (Hungary) Zalaegerszegi TK (2025- )
Medal record
Men's 9-pins
Representing Hungary
Event	1st	2nd	3rd
World Championships	6	4	5
World Cup	4	5	3
European Cup	2	3	1
U23 World Championships	1	0	0
Total	13	12	8
Event	1st	2nd	3rd
Single	1	2	2
Sprint	1	0	0
Combination	1	0	1
Team	8	10	6
Pair	1	0	0
Mixed tandem	1	0	0
World Championships
Gold medal – first place	2004 Brașov	Team
Gold medal – first place	2007 Košice	Team
Gold medal – first place	2008 Banja Luka	Combination
Gold medal – first place	2011 Zalaegerszeg	Team
Gold medal – first place	2012 Leszno	Sprint
Gold medal – first place	2014 Brno	Mixed tandem
Silver medal – second place	2005 Novi Sad	Team
Silver medal – second place	2011 Sarajevo	Team
Silver medal – second place	2016 Novigrad	Single
Silver medal – second place	2017 Dettenheim	Team
Bronze medal – third place	2008 Banja Luka	Single
Bronze medal – third place	2012 Leszno	Combination
Bronze medal – third place	2015 Speichersdorf	Team
Bronze medal – third place	2019 Rokycany	Team
Bronze medal – third place	2025 Székesfehérvár	Team
World Cup
Gold medal – first place	2015 Veľký Šariš	Team
Gold medal – first place	2006 Osijek	Team
Gold medal – first place	2012 Augsburg	Team
Gold medal – first place	2015 Hirschau	Single
Silver medal – second place	2004 Eppelheim	Team
Silver medal – second place	2008 Ritzing	Team
Silver medal – second place	2009 Budapest	Team
Silver medal – second place	2011 Zalaegerszeg	Single
Silver medal – second place	2014 Hard/Koblach	Team
Bronze medal – third place	2003 Blansko/Přerov	Team
Bronze medal – third place	2009 Rijeka	Single
Bronze medal – third place	2019 Ludwigshafen	Team
European Cup
Gold medal – first place	2011 Bolzano	Team
Gold medal – first place	2013 Augsburg	Team
Silver medal – second place	2001 Târgoviște	Team
Silver medal – second place	2007 Augsburg	Team
Silver medal – second place	2010 Split	Team
Bronze medal – third place	2017 Hirschau	Team
U23 World Championships
Gold medal – first place	2003 Augsburg	Pair

Norbert Kiss (born 29 June 1980 in Kaposvár) is a Hungarian 9 pin bowling player who plays for Szegedi TE and Hungary national team.
