= 2022 World Singles Ninepin Bowling Classic Championships – Women's single =

Women's single at the 2022 World Single Ninepin Bowling Classic Championships
- Location: Elva, Estonia
- Dates: 23-24 May 2022 (Qualifying); 26-28 May 2022 (Knock-out phase)
- Competitors: 61 from 15 nations

Medalists
gold medal	Anna Müller	Germany
silver medal	Boglárka Hari	Hungary
bronze medal	Jana-Sophie Bachert	Germany
bronze medal	Yvonne Schneider	Germany

The women's single event at the 2022 World Singles Ninepin Bowling Classic Championships was held in Elva, Estonia. Qualifying took place on 23-24 May, while knock-out phase from 26 May to 28 May 2022.

Sina Beisser, who missed the championships, could not defend her title won at 2018 World Championships in Cluj-Napoca. The new world champion became also German Anna Müller, who defeated in the final Hungarian Boglárka Hari.

== Qualifying ==
=== Starting places ===
The starting places have been allocated on the basis of each nation achievements during the previous championships. The first were given on the basis of the places taken by the teams during 2021 World Championships, and the rest in reference to the competition of previous championships taken.

	(Austria) AUT	(Bosnia and Herzegovina) ~~BIH~~	(Croatia) CRO	(Czech Republic) CZE	(Denmark) DEN	(Estonia) EST	(France) FRA	(Germany) GER	(Hungary) HUN	(Italy) ITA	(Poland) POL	(Romania) ROU	(Slovenia) SLO	(Serbia) SRB	(Slovakia) SVK	(Sweden) SWE	Total
Number of seeds	4	0	5+1	6	1	2	3	6	4+2	1	3	4	4+2	5+1	3+3	1	61

=== Results ===
All players played qualifying game with 120 balls. Best 32 qualified to the knock-out phase.

Rank	Name	Country	All	Clear off	Faults	Total	Notes
1	Anna Müller	Germany	424	248	1	672	Q
2	Luminita Viorica Dogaru	Romania	388	270	0	658	Q
3	Eva Sajko	Slovenia	423	231	4	654	Q
4	Matea Juričić	Croatia	402	247	1	649	Q
5	Jana-Sophie Bachert	Germany	415	230	0	645	Q
6	Boglárka Hari	Hungary	416	229	2	645	Q
7	Jana Braunová	Czech Republic	392	250	0	642	Q
8	Natálie Topičová	Czech Republic	387	248	1	635	Q
9	Fiona Steiner	Austria	399	230	0	629	Q
10	Yvonne Schneider	Germany	395	232	2	627	Q
11	Hana Wiedermannová	Czech Republic	405	222	0	627	Q
12	Julia Huber	Austria	378	243	2	621	Q
13	Olivera Čikoš	Serbia	403	216	1	619	Q
14	Anita Méhész	Hungary	388	228	3	616	Q
15	Kristina Ljubenković	Serbia	391	224	0	615	Q
16	Ines Maričić	Croatia	401	214	1	615	Q
17	Irena Mejač	Slovenia	410	202	2	612	Q
18	Valentina Gal	Croatia	392	218	3	610	Q
19	Nikola Tatoušková	Czech Republic	399	211	2	610	Q
20	Alena Bimber	Germany	391	217	2	608	Q
21	Aurélie Remy	France	382	224	0	606	Q
22	Margot Gribelin	France	397	209	2	606	Q
23	Jasmina Anđelković	Serbia	395	210	0	605	Q
24	Milana Pavlić	Croatia	376	226	0	602	Q
25	Marija Ahačič Premrl	Slovenia	391	211	1	602	Q
26	Laura Runggatscher	Italy	383	218	1	601	Q
27	Katalin Tóth	Hungary	395	203	3	598	Q
28	Nicole Plamenig	Austria	380	216	1	596	Q
29	Patricija Bizjak	Slovenia	391	205	3	596	Q
30	Daniela Lăcătuşu	Romania	382	213	5	595	Q
31	Dana Martinkevič	Czech Republic	388	207	0	595	Q
32	Edit Sass	Hungary	408	186	2	594	Q
33	Vlasta Kohoutová	Czech Republic	371	222	1	593	
34	Nicoletta Dudziak	Poland	393	200	2	593	
35	Maja Plavčak	Slovenia	382	210	3	592	
36	Dijana Kormanjoš	Serbia	379	209	0	588	
37	Klaudia Pivková	Slovakia	386	201	4	587	
38	Ljiljana Frenc	Serbia	390	194	0	584	
39	Christina Neundörfer	Germany	398	185	3	583	
40	Vladimíra Vávrová	Slovakia	398	185	3	583	
41	Andrea Tóth	Hungary	362	220	1	582	
42	Aleksandra Bonk	Poland	406	172	2	578	
43	Nataša Ravnić	Croatia	372	205	0	577	
44	Klara Sedlar	Croatia	381	196	1	577	
45	Dominika Zygarłowska	Poland	379	196	4	575	
46	Amélie Zind	France	392	183	1	575	
47	Hermina Lukač	Serbia	396	176	3	572	
48	Alina Ştefania Sanda	Romania	370	201	4	571	
49	Celine Zenker	Germany	378	193	1	571	
50	Petra Pečovnik	Slovenia	379	192	0	571	
51	Marian Saar	Estonia	393	177	4	570	
52	Jenny Smevold	Sweden	376	192	1	568	
53	Heret Ots	Estonia	378	190	5	568	
54	Réka Fekete	Romania	371	196	3	567	
55	Jana Poliaková	Slovakia	384	177	1	561	
56	Dana Klubertová	Slovakia	362	197	3	559	
57	Katarína Večeríkova	Slovakia	375	178	1	553	
58	Dominika Kyselicová	Slovakia	360	189	3	549	
59	Nathalie Neubauer	Austria	369	180	6	549	
60	Beatrix Nagy	Hungary	360	175	0	535	
61	Bente Wiinberg	Denmark	333	123	24	456	

=== Finals ===
According to the results of the qualification, 32 players were put together in bouts, which took place on standard match rules - 4 sets of 30 throws. The competitor who obtains a larger number of sets wins. With an equal number of sets decides a higher total score.

=== Schedule ===
Round of 32 - Thursday, 26 May

Match #	Lanes	Player 1	Score	Player 2	Set 1	Set 2	Set 3	Set 4
1st unit 11:00 (EEST)
SCW 1	5 – 8	(Germany) Anna Müller	2 - 2; 651 - 633	(Hungary) Edit Sass	178 - 159	153 - 167	162 - 143	158 - 164
SCW 2	5 – 8	(Slovenia) Irena Mejač	3 - 1; 630 - 622	(Croatia) Ines Maričić	151 - 145	162 - 160	160 - 166	157 - 151
2nd unit 12:20 (EEST)
SCW 3	5 – 8	(Austria) Fiona Steiner	3 - 1; 591 - 597	(Croatia) Milana Pavlić	147 - 145	140 - 162	146 - 143	158 - 147
SCW 4	5 – 8	(Slovenia) Marija Ahačič Premrl	2 - 2; 577 - 610	(Czech Republic) Natálie Topičová	144 - 142	140 - 167	143 - 155	150 - 146
3rd unit 13:40 (EEST)
SCW 5	5 – 8	(Germany) Jana-Sophie Bachert	2 - 2; 604 - 595	(Austria) Nicole Plamenig	145 - 131	164 - 151	146 - 159	149 - 154
SCW 6	5 – 8	(France) Aurélie Remy	2 - 2; 586 - 629	(Austria) Julia Huber	143 - 161	158 - 151	134 - 171	151 - 146
4th unit 15:00 (EEST)
SCW 7	5 – 8	(Serbia) Olivera Čikoš	2 - 2; 609 - 556	(Germany) Alena Bimber	164 - 119	172 - 141	133 - 150	140 - 146
SCW 8	5 – 8	(Slovenia) Patricija Bizjak	1.5 - 2.5; 596 - 611	(Croatia) Matea Juričić	155 - 155	136 - 163	147 - 155	158 - 138
5th unit 16:20 (EEST)
SCW 9	5 – 8	(Slovenia) Eva Sajko	3 - 1; 610 - 554	(Romania) Daniela Lăcătuşu	151 - 142	161 - 137	153 - 125	145 - 150
SCW 10	5 – 8	(Czech Republic) Nikola Tatoušková	3 - 1; 610 - 598	(Hungary) Anita Méhész	158 - 148	156 - 147	154 - 150	142 - 153
6th unit 17:40 (EEST)
SCW 11	5 – 8	(Czech Republic) Hana Wiedermannová	2 - 2; 586 - 580	(France) Margot Gribelin	153 - 160	132 - 141	147 - 141	154 - 138
SCW 12	5 – 8	(Hungary) Katalin Tóth	2 - 2; 606 - 613	(Hungary) Boglárka Hari	146 - 160	156 - 150	167 - 158	137 - 145
7th unit 19:00 (EEST)
SCW 13	5 – 8	(Czech Republic) Jana Braunová	1 - 3; 602 - 600	(Italy) Laura Runggatscher	145 - 147	153 - 156	159 - 148	145 - 149
SCW 14	5 – 8	(Serbia) Jasmina Anđelković	1 - 3; 598 - 620	(Germany) Yvonne Schneider	149 - 152	163 - 157	144 - 159	142 - 152
8th unit 20:20 (EEST)
SCW 15	5 – 8	(Serbia) Kristina Ljubenković	1 - 3; 597 - 631	(Croatia) Valentina Gal	157 - 161	143 - 166	152 - 132	145 - 172
SCW 16	5 – 8	(Czech Republic) Dana Martinkevič	2 - 2; 592 - 613	(Romania) Luminita Viorica Dogaru	162 - 142	133 - 175	133 - 162	164 - 134

Round of 16 - Friday, 27 May

Match #	Lanes	Player 1	Score	Player 2	Set 1	Set 2	Set 3	Set 4
1st unit 10:00 (EEST)
SCW 17	1 – 4	(Germany) Anna Müller	2.5 - 1.5; 608 - 584	(Slovenia) Irena Mejač	153 - 152	156 - 168	148 - 148	151 - 116
SCW 18	1 – 4	(Austria) Fiona Steiner	2 - 4; 588 - 664	(Czech Republic) Natálie Topičová	138 - 158	161 - 168	144 - 167	145 - 171
2nd unit 11:20 (EEST)
SCW 19	1 – 4	(Germany) Jana-Sophie Bachert	3 - 1; 632 - 583	(Austria) Julia Huber	168 - 140	150 - 144	148 - 152	166 - 147
SCW 20	1 – 4	(Serbia) Olivera Čikoš	3 - 1; 621 - 614	(Croatia) Matea Juričić	158 - 152	151 - 165	150 - 143	162 - 154
3rd unit 12:40 (EEST)
SCW 21	1 – 4	(Slovenia) Eva Sajko	2 - 2; 603 - 638	(Czech Republic) Nikola Tatoušková	143 - 188	144 - 154	147 - 140	169 - 156
SCW 22	1 – 4	(Czech Republic) Hana Wiedermannová	1 - 3; 602 - 619	(Hungary) Boglárka Hari	165 - 174	123 - 136	168 - 153	146 - 156
4th unit 14:00 (EEST)
SCW 23	1 – 4	(Italy) Laura Runggatscher	0.5 - 3.5; 577 - 607	(Germany) Yvonne Schneider	146 - 152	156 - 165	144 - 144	131 - 146
SCW 24	1 – 4	(Croatia) Valentina Gal	3 - 1; 647 - 618	(Romania) Luminita Viorica Dogaru	152 - 162	161 - 157	166 - 165	168 - 134

Quarterfinals - Friday, 27 May

Match #	Lanes	Player 1	Score	Player 2	Set 1	Set 2	Set 3	Set 4
1st unit 15:30 (EEST)
SCW 25	5 – 8	(Germany) Anna Müller	3 - 1; 626 - 595	(Czech Republic) Natálie Topičová	165 - 153	145 - 147	144 - 142	172 - 153
SCW 26	5 – 8	(Germany) Jana-Sophie Bachert	3 - 1; 593 - 588	(Serbia) Olivera Čikoš	140 - 134	154 - 139	141 - 162	158 - 153
2nd unit 16:50 (EEST)
SCW 27	5 – 8	(Czech Republic) Nikola Tatoušková	2 - 2; 587 - 595	(Hungary) Boglárka Hari	124 - 145	145 - 139	162 - 151	156 - 160
SCW 28	5 – 8	(Germany) Yvonne Schneider	3 - 1; 567 - 568	(Croatia) Valentina Gal	154 - 144	142 - 135	132 - 152	139 - 137

Semifinals - Saturday, 28 May

Match #	Lanes	Player 1	Score	Player 2	Set 1	Set 2	Set 3	Set 4
10:00 (EEST)
SCW 29	1 – 4	(Germany) Anna Müller	2 - 2; 645 - 636	(Germany) Jana-Sophie Bachert	158 - 159	170 - 146	165 - 159	152 - 172
SCW 30	1 – 4	(Hungary) Boglárka Hari	4 - 0; 634 - 555	(Germany) Yvonne Schneider	149 - 148	148 - 142	171 - 134	166 - 131

Final - Saturday, 28 May

Match #	Lanes	Player 1	Score	Player 2	Set 1	Set 2	Set 3	Set 4
11:30 (EEST)
SCW 31	3 – 6	(Germany) Anna Müller	3 - 1; 648 - 615	(Hungary) Boglárka Hari	165 - 152	177 - 150	155 - 163	151 - 150

=== Bracket ===
Round of 32; 26 May
1	(Germany) Anna Müller	2	651
32	(Hungary) Edit Sass	2	633
17	(Slovenia) Irena Mejač	3	630
16	(Croatia) Ines Maričić	1	622
9	(Austria) Fiona Steiner	3	591
24	(Croatia) Milana Pavlić	1	597
25	(Slovenia) Marija Ahačič Premrl	2	577
8	(Czech Republic) Natálie Topičová	2	610
5	(Germany) Jana-Sophie Bachert	2	604
28	(Austria) Nicole Plamenig	2	595
21	(France) Aurélie Remy	2	586
12	(Austria) Julia Huber	2	629
13	(Serbia) Olivera Čikoš	2	609
20	(Germany) Alena Bimber	2	556
29	(Slovenia) Patricija Bizjak	1.5	596
4	(Croatia) Matea Juričić	2.5	611
3	(Slovenia) Eva Sajko	3	610
30	(Romania) Daniela Lăcătuşu	1	554
19	(Czech Republic) Nikola Tatoušková	3	610
14	(Hungary) Anita Méhész	1	598
11	(Czech Republic) Hana Wiedermannová	2	586
22	(France) Margot Gribelin	2	580
27	(Hungary) Katalin Tóth	2	606
6	(Hungary) Boglárka Hari	2	613
7	(Czech Republic) Jana Braunová	1	602
26	(Italy) Laura Runggatscher	3	600
23	(Serbia) Jasmina Anđelković	1	598
10	(Germany) Yvonne Schneider	3	620
15	(Serbia) Kristina Ljubenković	1	597
18	(Croatia) Valentina Gal	3	631
31	(Czech Republic) Dana Martinkevič	2	592
2	(Romania) Luminita Viorica Dogaru	2	613

Round of 16; 27 May
(Germany) Anna Müller	2.5	608
(Slovenia) Irena Mejač	1.5	584
(Austria) Fiona Steiner	0	588
(Czech Republic) Natálie Topičová	4	664
(Germany) Jana-Sophie Bachert	3	632
(Austria) Julia Huber	1	583
(Serbia) Olivera Čikoš	3	621
(Croatia) Matea Juričić	1	614
(Slovenia) Eva Sajko	2	603
(Czech Republic) Nikola Tatoušková	2	638
(Czech Republic) Hana Wiedermannová	1	602
(Hungary) Boglárka Hari	3	619
(Italy) Laura Runggatscher	0.5	577
(Germany) Yvonne Schneider	3.5	607
(Croatia) Valentina Gal	3	647
(Romania) Luminita Viorica Dogaru	1	618

Quarterfinals; 27 May
(Germany) Anna Müller	3	626
(Czech Republic) Natálie Topičová	1	595
(Germany) Jana-Sophie Bachert	3	593
(Serbia) Olivera Čikoš	1	588
(Czech Republic) Nikola Tatoušková	2	587
(Hungary) Boglárka Hari	2	595
(Germany) Yvonne Schneider	3	567
(Croatia) Valentina Gal	1	568

Semifinals; 28 May
(Germany) Anna Müller	2	645
(Germany) Jana-Sophie Bachert	2	636
(Hungary) Boglárka Hari	4	634
(Germany) Yvonne Schneider	0	555

Final; 28 May
(Germany) Anna Müller	3	648
(Hungary) Boglárka Hari	1	615
