= 2016 World Singles Ninepin Bowling Classic Championships – Women's sprint =

Women's sprint at the 2016 World Singles Ninepin Bowling Classic Championships
- Location: Novigrad, Croatia
- Dates: 23 May 2018
- Competitors: 32 from 16 nations

Medalists
gold medal	(Poland) Beata Włodarczyk
silver medal	(Slovenia) Brigita Strelec
bronze medal	(Bosnia and Herzegovina) Tatjana Zlojutro
bronze medal	(France) Gwennaelle Adler

The women's sprint event at the 2016 World Singles Ninepin Bowling Classic Championships was held in Cluj-Napoca, Romania on 23 May 2018.

The title of world champion was won by Pole Beata Włodarczyk, who defeated Slovene Brigita Strelec in the final. Bronze medals went to semi-finalists French Gwennaelle Adler and Bosnian Tatjana Zlojutro.

== Results ==
=== Starting places ===
The starting places have been allocated on the basis of each team's achievements during the previous championships.

	(Austria) AUT	(Bosnia and Herzegovina) BIH	(Croatia) CRO	(Czech Republic) CZE	(Denmark) DEN	(Estonia) EST	(France) FRA	(Germany) GER	(Hungary) HUN	(Italy) ITA	(Montenegro) MNE	(Poland) POL	(Romania) ROU	(Slovenia) SLO	(Serbia) SRB	(Slovakia) SVK	(Sweden) SWE	Total
Number of seeds	2	1	2	3	1	1	2	2	2	1	1	1	2	3	3	3	1	32

=== Draw ===
The players were drawn into pairs with the reservation that competitors from the same country can not play in the first round against each other.

Round of 32
(Germany) Corinna Kastner	1	21
(Italy) Adele Ainhauser	1	19
(Serbia) Renata Vilov	2
(Slovakia) Lenka Gordiková	0
(Romania) Anna Gyeresi	1	17
(Denmark) Heidi Poulsen	1	11
(Slovenia) Eva Sajko	1	21
(Bosnia and Herzegovina) Tatjana Zlojutro	1	22
(Austria) Dominique Pumpler	2
(Slovenia) Anja Kozmus	0
(Germany) Sabrina Imbs	1	34
(Slovenia) Brigita Strelec	1	38
(Hungary) Edina Tímár	1	19
(Montenegro) Marija Hamm	1	20
(Croatia) Marijana Liović	1	20
(Romania) Cristina-Alexandra Samson	1	19
(Serbia) Zorica Barać	0
(Croatia) Ines Maričić	2
(Slovakia) Dana Klubertová	1	15
(Hungary) Anita Méhész	1	19
(Sweden) Carola Grüttner
(Slovakia) Katarina Valigurová	2
(France) Aurelie Remy	0
(Poland) Beata Włodarczyk	2
(Austria) Lisa Vsetecka	0
(Czech Republic) Hana Wiedermannová	2
(Czech Republic) Renata Navrkalová	1	17
(Germany) Sina Beißer	1	15
(Serbia) Jasmina Anđelković	1	19
(Czech Republic) Aneta Cvejnová	1	16
(Estonia) Heret Ots	0
(France) Gwenaëlle Adler	2

Round of 16
(Germany) Corinna Kastner	0
(Serbia) Renata Vilov	2
(Romania) Anna Gyeresi	1	16
(Bosnia and Herzegovina) Tatjana Zlojutro	1	25
(Austria) Dominique Pumpler	0
(Slovenia) Brigita Strelec	2
(Montenegro) Marija Hamm	0
(Croatia) Marijana Liović	2
(Croatia) Ines Maričić	0
(Hungary) Anita Méhész	2
(Slovakia) Katarina Valigurová	0
(Poland) Beata Włodarczyk	2
(Czech Republic) Hana Wiedermannová	2
(Czech Republic) Renata Navrkalová	0
(Serbia) Jasmina Anđelković	1	19
(France) Gwenaëlle Adler	1	20

Quarterfinals
(Serbia) Renata Vilov	0
(Bosnia and Herzegovina) Tatjana Zlojutro	2
(Slovenia) Brigita Strelec	1	18
(Croatia) Marijana Liović	1	17
(Hungary) Anita Méhész	0
(Poland) Beata Włodarczyk	2
(Czech Republic) Hana Wiedermannová	1	17
(France) Gwenaëlle Adler	1	18

Semifinals
(Bosnia and Herzegovina) Tatjana Zlojutro	1	22
(Slovenia) Brigita Strelec	1	23
(Poland) Beata Włodarczyk	2
(France) Gwenaëlle Adler	0

Final
(Slovenia) Brigita Strelec	0
(Poland) Beata Włodarczyk	2
