= 2016 in bowling =

== PBA Bowling Tour: 2016 season ==
- February 25 – March 2: H.H. Emir Cup in (Qatar) Doha
  - Winner: (United States) Danielle McEwan
- March 4 – 9: 14th Kingdom of Bahrain International Bowling Championships in Manama
  - Winner: (Bahrain) Ahmed Al-Awadhi
- March 13 – 20: Brunswick Euro Challenge in (Germany) Unterföhring
  - Winner: (Sweden) Jesper Svensson
- August 6 – 12: PBA–WBT Thailand in Bangkok
  - Winner: (Sweden) Jesper Svensson
- November 1 – 8: UAE Open in (United Arab Emirates) Abu Dhabi
  - Canceled
- November 10 – 16: Kuwait Open in Kuwait City
  - Canceled
- November 18 – 23: 10th Kingdom International Open in (Saudi Arabia) Riyadh
  - Canceled
- December 10 – 16: Qatar Open 2016 in Doha
  - Winner: (Latvia) Diana Zavjalova
- December: PBA World Championship (final) in (United States) Reno
  - Winner: (United States) E. J. Tackett

== European Bowling Tour 2016 ==
- December 29, 2015 – January 10, 2016: Brunswick Ballmaster Open in (Finland) Helsinki
  - Winner: (United States) Parker Bohn III
- January 10 – 17: 28th Irish Open Championships in association with Storm in (Republic of Ireland) Dublin
  - Winner: (Republic of Ireland) Tom Byrne
- January 31 – February 7: Hammer Bronzen Schietspoel Tournament 2016 in (Netherlands) Tilburg
  - Winner: (Sweden) Daniel Fransson
- February 17 – 21: 10th International Wroclaw Open in (Poland) Wrocław
  - Winner: (Sweden) Daniel Fransson
- March 12 – 20: Brunswick Euro Challenge in (Germany) Unterföhring
  - Winner: (Sweden) Jesper Svensson
- May 23 – 29: Kegel Aalborg International 2016 in (Denmark) Aalborg
  - Winner: (Sweden) Peter Hellström
- May 29 – June 5: Odense International in (Denmark) Odense
  - Winner: (England) Richard Teece
- July 2 – 10: IV Brunswick Madrid Challenge in (Spain) Madrid
  - Winner: (England) Ray Teece
- July 9 – 17: 12th Storm San Marino Open in Serravalle
  - Winner: (England) Dominic Barrett
- July 16 – 24: Track Dream-Bowl Palace Open by Erdinger in (Germany) Munich
  - Winner: (Malaysia) Sin Li Jane
- July 25 – 31: Polish Open in (Poland) Wrocław
  - Winner: (England) Richard Teece
- September 11 – 18: Chandra Open 2016 in (Netherlands) Nieuwegein
  - Winner: (Netherlands) Ghislaine Stigter-van der Tol
- September 26 – October 2: 14th Columbia 300 Vienna Open in (Austria) Vienna
  - Winner: (Sweden) Jesper Svensson
- October 3 – 9: 1st Emax Open in (Germany) Munich
  - Winner: (England) Richard Teece
- October 7 – 16: Norwegian Open 2016 by Brunswick in (Norway) Oslo
  - Winner: (Sweden) Jesper Svensson
- December 10 – 16: Qatar Bowling Open 2016 (final) in Doha

== Asian Bowling Tour 2016 ==
- April 8: ABF Tour - Thailand 2016 in Bangkok
  - Men's winner: (Australia) Sam Cooley
  - Women's winner: (Malaysia) Sharon Koh
- June 27: ABF Tour – Macau 2016 in Macau
  - Men's winner: (Japan) Daisuke Yoshida
  - Women's winner: (South Korea) Lee Young Seung
- July 10: ABF Tour – Chinese Taipei 2016 in Kaohsiung
  - Men's winner: (Hong Kong) Michael Mak
  - Women's winner: (Hong Kong) Hsu Chun-Yi
- July 18: ABF Tour – Hong Kong 2016 in Hong Kong
  - Men's winner: (Hong Kong) Michael Mak
  - Women's winner: (South Korea) Han Kyeo Rae
- October 13: ABF Tour - China 2016 in Shanghai
  - Men's winner: (China) Mi Zhongli
  - Women's winner: (China) Yang Liyan
- October 24: ABF Tour - Indonesia 2016 in Jakarta
  - Men's winner: (Singapore) Remy Ong
  - Women's winner: (Malaysia) Esther Cheah
- November 8 – 9: ABF Tour Tournament of Champions 2016 in Kuwait
  - Canceled

== Other in bowling ==
- March 19 – 28: European Youth Championships 2016 in (Iceland) Reykjavík
  - Boys' singles winner: (Denmark) Patrik Sörensen
  - Girls' singles winner: (Russia) Maria Bulanova
  - Boys' all events winner: (Finland) Niko Oksanen
  - Girls' all events winner: (Sweden) Cajsa Wegner
  - Boys' Masters winner: (Sweden) William Svensson
  - Girls' Masters winner: (Russia) Maria Bulanova
  - Boys' doubles winners: Sweden 1 (William Svensson & Robert Lindberg)
  - Girls' doubles winners: Germany 2 (Bettina Burghard & Lea Degenhardt)
  - Boys' team winners: Slovenia (Aleksander Kostric, Rok Kostric, Ziga Zalar, Tim Cerkvenik)
  - Girls' team winners: Sweden (Amanda Nyman, Alida Molander, Cajsa Wegner, Madelene Gullberg)
- April 3 – 10: CONCECABOL Senior and Super Senior in Medellín
  - Colombia won both the gold and overall medal tallies.
- April 22 – 26: PABCON Champion of Champions in (Mexico) Mérida
  - Men's winner: (Canada) François Lavoie
  - Women's winner: (Colombia) Rocio Restrepo
- May 22 – 28: 2016 WNBA Nine-Pin Bowling World Championships in (Croatia) Novigrad
  - Men's Single winner: (Serbia) Vilmoš Zavarko
  - Men's Sprint winner: (Serbia) Vilmoš Zavarko
  - Men's Combined winner: (Serbia) Igor Kovačić
  - Women's Single winner: (Croatia) Ines Maričić
  - Women's Sprint winner: (Poland) Beata Włodarczyk
  - Women's Combined winner: (Croatia) Ines Maričić
  - Mixed Tandem winners: Romania (Luminiţa Viorica Dogaru & Nicolae Lupu)
- May 7 – 14: 2nd CONCECABOL Championship in (Mexico) Mérida
  - Winners: (Colombia) Harvey Ramos (m) / (Mexico) Jessica Sandoval (f)
- May 27 – June 2: 27th East Asian Tenpin Bowling Championship in (Guam) Tamuning
  - South Korea wins overall gold and medal tally.
- June 8 – 19: European Women Championships 2016 in (Austria) Vienna
  - Women's Singles winner: (England) Keira Reay
  - Women's Doubles winners: Sweden 3 (Nina Flack & Joline Persson Planefors)
  - Women's Trio winners: Germany 1 (Birgit Pöppler, Tina Hulsch, Nadine Geißler)
  - Women's Team winners: Sweden
- June 25 – July 1: European Senior Bowling Championships 2016 in (Denmark) Copenhagen
  - Singles winners: (Denmark) Michael Wittendorff (m) / (Germany) Martina Beckel (f)
  - Doubles winners: Sweden 11 (Fred Larsson, Clas-Göran Henriksson) (m) / Czech Republic 1 (Miluše Nováková, Jana Lébrová) (f)
  - Trios winners: England 2 (Larry Exell, Kim Johnson, Paul Morris) (m) / Finland 12 (Jaana Anttas, Tuula Tamminen, Helvi Nybakka) (f)
  - All events winners: (Denmark) Michael Wittendorff (m) / (Germany) Martina Beckel (f)
- July 24 – August 3: 2016 World Tenpin Bowling Youth Championships in Lincoln, Nebraska
  - Singles winners: (United States) Wesley Low Jr. (m) / (United States) Gazmine Mason (f)
  - Doubles winners: United States 1 (Anthony Simonsen, Wesley Low Jr.) (m) / South Korea 1 (Lee Yeong-seung, Pak Yu-na) (f)
  - Teams winners: United States 1 (Kamron Doyle, Wesley Low Jr., Anthony Simonsen, Michael Tang) (m) / South Korea 1 (Hong Sun-hwa, Kim Jin-ju, Lee Yeong-seung, Pak Yu-na) (f)
  - All Event winners: (Sweden) Pontus Andersson (m) / (United States) Gazmine Mason (f)
  - Masters winners: (United States) Anthony Simonsen (m) / (Malaysia) Natasha Roslan (f)
- August 17 – 28: European Men Championship 2016 in (Belgium) Wemmel
  - Singles winner: (Denmark) Jesper Agerbo
  - Doubles winners: Finland 3 (Joonas Jähi, Osku Palermaa)
  - Trios winners: Norway 1 (Glenn Morten Pedersen, Oyvin Kulseng, Tore Torgersen)
  - Team winners: Sweden (Peter Hellström, Martin Larsen, Jesper Svensson, Markus Jansson, Mattias Wetterberg, Pontus Andersson)
  - All Event winner: (Denmark) Jesper Agerbo
- August 21 – 28: Pabcon Senior & Super Senior Championship in (Dominican Republic) Santo Domingo
  - Seniors winners: (Puerto Rico) Tony Santa (m) / (Mexico) Veronica Berumen (f)
  - Super Senior winners: (Canada) Bob Puttick (m) / (Colombia) Nora Delgado
- September 10 – 24:Pabcon Championships (combined men and women) in Cali
  - Singles winners: (United States) Sean Rash (m) / (United States) Missy Parkin (f)
  - Doubles winners: United States (John Szczerbinski, AJ Chapman) (m) / Colombia (Clara Guerrero, Rocio Restrepo) (f)
  - Trios winners: Canada (Zach Wilkinis, Mitch Hupé, François Lavoie) (m) / United States (Shannon Pluhowsky, Shannon O'Keefe, Josie Earnest) (f)
  - Team winners: United States (m) / Colombia (f)
  - All Event winners: (Canada) Zach Wilkinis (m) / (Colombia) Clara Guerrero (f)
  - Masters winners: (United States) Marshall Kent (m) / (United States) Shannon Pluhowsky (f)
- September 18 – 28: 24th Asian Tenpin Bowling Championships in Hong Kong
  - Hong Kong won both the gold. South Korea overall medal tallies.
- October 14 – 23: QubicaAMF World Cup 2016 in (China) Shanghai
  - Winners: (China) Wang Hongbo (m) / (Sweden) Jenny Wegner
- October 24 – 31: European Champions Cup 2016 in (Czech Republic) Olomouc
  - Winners: (Czech Republic) Jaroslav Lorenc (m) / (Sweden) Cajsa Wegner
- October 25 – 31: 30th Asian Intercity Bowling Championships in (Indonesia) Jakarta
  - Senior Men's Medal Tally: (Indonesia) Jakarta (m) / (Indonesia) Jakarta (f)
  - Men's winners: (South Korea) Daegu / Women's winners: Singapore
  - Overall Medal Tally: Singapore
- November 19 – 27: Commonwealth Championships 2016 in (South Africa) Johannesburg
  - Winners: (Malaysia) Mohd Nur Aiman (m) / (Malaysia) Siti Amirah (f)
- November 20 – 30: 14th Asian Senior Bowling Championship in (South Korea) Seoul
  - Seniors Masters winners: (South Korea) Jang Rang Hyun (m) / (Japan) Yumiko Yoshida (f)
  - Grand Seniors Masters winners: (Japan) Masanobu Matsui (m) / (Japan) Junko Kuji (f)
- December 2 – 9: World Single Championships – men and women in (Qatar) Doha
