= 2016 World Singles Ninepin Bowling Classic Championships – Women's single =

Women's single at the 2016 World Singles Ninepin Bowling Classic Championships
- Location: Novigrad, Croatia
- Dates: 23-24 May 2016 (Qualification); 26-28 May 2018 (Knock-out phase)
- Competitors: 64 from 16 nations
- Top scorer: (Croatia) Ines Maričić 675

Medalists
gold medal	(Croatia) Ines Maričić
silver medal	(Germany) Sina Beißer
bronze medal	(Czech Republic) Aneta Cvejnová
bronze medal	(Croatia) Nataša Ravnić-Gašparini

The women's single event at the 2016 World Singles Ninepin Bowling Classic Championships was held in Novigrad, Croatia. Qualification took place on 23-24 May, while the knock-out phase from 26 May to 28 May 2016.

== Results ==
=== Qualification ===
32 players qualified for the knock-out phase.

Rank	Name	Country	All	Clean	X	Total	Notes
1	Edina Tímár	Hungary	418	235	0	653	Q
2	Eva Sajko	Slovenia	410	239	2	649	Q
3	Jasmina Anđelković	Serbia	410	223	1	633	Q
4	Petra Fegyveres	Hungary	386	240	0	626	Q
5	Klara Sedlar	Croatia	394	232	5	626	Q
6	Renáta Navrkalová	Czech Republic	403	221	1	624	Q
7	Ines Maričić	Croatia	408	216	0	624	Q
8	Cristina-Alexandra Samson	Romania	410	211	3	621	Q
9	Corinna Kastner	Germany	402	216	1	618	Q
10	Gabriella Rózsa-Drajko	Hungary	397	218	0	615	Q
11	Aneta Cvejnová	Czech Republic	380	234	1	614	Q
12	Nikola Tatoušková	Czech Republic	402	210	0	612	Q
13	Sina Beißer	Germany	396	215	3	611	Q
14	Marion Thaler	Italy	380	230	0	610	Q
15	Annemarie Innerhofer	Italy	384	226	5	610	Q
16	Katarína Valigurová	Slovakia	378	230	1	608	Q
17	Nataša Ravnić-Gašparini	Croatia	396	212	2	608	Q
18	Anita Méhész	Hungary	391	216	1	607	Q
19	Anna Gyeresi	Romania	391	216	3	607	Q
20	Heret Ots	Estonia	387	219	2	606	Q
21	Renata Vilov	Serbia	387	219	3	606	Q
22	Marijana Liović	Croatia	397	206	1	603	Q
23	Hana Wiedermannová	Czech Republic	398	205	3	603	Q
24	Brigita Strelec	Slovenia	385	215	0	600	Q
25	Anita Dallosné Takács	Hungary	360	239	4	599	Q
26	Anja Kozmus	Slovenia	398	201	1	599	Q
27	Heidi Poulsen	Denmark	388	210	4	598	Q
28	Tatjana Zlojutro	Bosnia and Herzegovina	401	197	2	598	Q
29	Luminita Viorica Dogaru	Romania	395	200	6	595	Q
30	Tatjana Dajić	Bosnia and Herzegovina	391	202	0	593	Q
31	Zorica Barać	Serbia	369	223	3	592	Q
32	Ana Jambrović	Croatia	393	199	3	592	Q
33	Beata Włodarczyk	Poland	392	199	1	591	
34	Sabrina Imbs	Germany	403	188	0	591	
35	Dagmar Kyselicová	Slovakia	380	210	4	590	
36	Melina Zimmermann	Germany	386	204	2	590	
37	Marija Kresović	Serbia	397	192	1	589	
38	Dana Wiedermannová	Czech Republic	366	220	0	586	
39	Simone Schneider	Germany	366	220	3	586	
40	Irena Mejač	Slovenia	368	217	1	585	
41	Lenka Gordiková	Slovakia	385	196	4	581	
42	Adele Ainhauser	Italy	392	188	5	580	
43	Dana Klubertová	Slovakia	387	191	4	578	
44	Ana Bacan	Croatia	373	204	0	577	
45	Lisa Vsetecka	Austria	371	205	1	576	
46	Anita Sáfrány	Hungary	386	188	2	574	
47	Joanna Lajtke	Poland	390	184	5	574	
48	Daniela Kicker	Germany	377	196	2	573	
49	Anja Ulaga	Slovenia	369	203	1	572	
50	Dominique Pumpler	Austria	377	195	3	572	
51	Daniela Lacatusu	Romania	386	183	2	569	
52	Marian Saar	Estonia	375	193	3	568	
53	Aurélie Rémy	France	392	174	5	566	
54	Edith Pfattner	Italy	369	196	3	565	
55	Dragana Lotina	Bosnia and Herzegovina	387	176	6	563	
56	Nada Savić	Slovenia	374	185	1	559	
57	Marija Hamm	Montenegro	385	174	6	559	
58	Markéta Hofmanová	Czech Republic	372	184	1	556	
59	Nataša Savić	Serbia	382	167	3	549	
60	Neda Mijović	Montenegro	374	170	6	544	
61	Gwennaelle Adler	France	354	186	2	540	
62	Maria Jönnsson	Sweden	385	144	16	529	
63	Monika Nguyen	Austria	359	167	10	526	
64	Christina Soerensen	Denmark	346	173	9	519	

=== Finals ===
According to the results of the qualification, 32 players were put together in bouts, which took place on standard match rules - 4 sets of 30 throws. The competitor who obtains a larger number of sets wins. With an equal number of sets decides a higher total score.

Round of 32; 26 May
1	(Hungary) Edina Tímár	0	575
32	(Croatia) Ana Jambrović	4	620
17	(Croatia) Nataša Ravnić-Gašparini	4	628
16	(Slovakia) Katarína Valigurová	0	566
9	(Germany) Corinna Kastner	0	575
24	(Slovenia) Brigita Strelec	4	638
25	(Hungary) Anita Dallosné Takács	0	561
8	(Romania) Cristina-Alexandra Samson	4	641
5	(Croatia) Klara Sedlar	4	648
28	(Bosnia and Herzegovina) Tatjana Zlojutro	0	513
21	(Serbia) Renata Vilov	1.5	597
12	(Czech Republic) Nikola Tatoušková	2.5	591
13	(Germany) Sina Beißer	4	616
20	(Estonia) Heret Ots	0	550
29	(Romania) Luminita Viorica Dogaru	1.5	622
4	(Hungary) Petra Fegyveres	2.5	621
3	(Serbia) Jasmina Anđelković	4	612
30	(Bosnia and Herzegovina) Tatjana Dajić	0	548
19	(Czech Republic) Anna Gyeresi	3	573
14	(Italy) Marion Thaler	1	602
11	(Czech Republic) Aneta Cvejnová	3	605
22	(Croatia) Marijana Liović	1	591
27	(Denmark) Heidi Poulsen	1	537
6	(Czech Republic) Renáta Navrkalová	3	639
7	(Croatia) Ines Maričić	4	656
26	(Slovenia) Anja Kozmus	0	589
23	(Czech Republic) Hana Wiedermannová	2	628
10	(Hungary) Gabriella Rózsa-Drajko	2	613
15	(Italy) Annemarie Innerhofer	1	576
18	(Hungary) Anita Méhész	3	592
31	(Serbia) Zorica Barać	3	599
2	(Slovenia) Eva Sajko	1	590

Round of 16; 27 May
(Croatia) Ana Jambrović	0	576
(Croatia) Nataša Ravnić-Gašparini	4	620
(Slovenia) Brigita Strelec	3	597
(Romania) Cristina-Alexandra Samson	1	575
(Croatia) Klara Sedlar	1	585
(Czech Republic) Nikola Tatoušková	3	626
(Germany) Sina Beißer	2.5	628
(Hungary) Petra Fegyveres	1.5	606
(Serbia) Jasmina Anđelković	4	654
(Romania) Anna Gyeresi	0	581
(Czech Republic) Aneta Cvejnová	4	609
(Czech Republic) Renáta Navrkalová	0	561
(Croatia) Ines Maričić	2	654
(Czech Republic) Hana Wiedermannová	2	606
(Hungary) Anita Méhész	2	634
(Serbia) Zorica Barać	2	613

Quarterfinals; 27 May
(Croatia) Nataša Ravnić-Gašparini	3	597
(Slovenia) Brigita Strelec	1	593
(Czech Republic) Nikola Tatoušková	2	605
(Germany) Sina Beißer	2	611
(Serbia) Jasmina Anđelković	1	571
(Czech Republic) Aneta Cvejnová	3	594
(Croatia) Ines Maričić	2	613
(Hungary) Anita Méhész	2	605

Semifinals; 28 May
(Croatia) Nataša Ravnić-Gašparini	1	567
(Germany) Sina Beißer	3	631
(Czech Republic) Aneta Cvejnová	0	593
(Croatia) Ines Maričić	4	649

Final; 28 May
(Germany) Sina Beißer	1	617
(Croatia) Ines Maričić	3	675
