= 2016 World Singles Ninepin Bowling Classic Championships – Women's combined =

Women's combined at the 2016 World Singles Ninepin Bowling Classic Championships
- Location: Novigrad, Croatia
- Dates: 23-28 May 2016
- Competitors: 65 from 17 nations
- Winning score: 876

Medalists
gold medal	(Croatia) Ines Maričić
silver medal	(Hungary) Edina Timár
bronze medal	(Slovenia) Brigita Strelec

The women's combined event at the 2016 World Singles Ninepin Bowling Classic Championships was held in Novigrad, Croatia from 23 May to 28 May 2016.

== Results ==
The result for the combined was the sum of best results from a single starts in the single classic and sprint.

Rank	Name	Country	Single classic						Sprint					Total
Rank	Name	Country	Q	1/16	1/8	1/4	1/2	F	1/16	1/8	1/4	1/2	F	Total
1st place, gold medalist(s)	Ines Maričić	Croatia	624	656	654	613	649	**675**	**201**	195				876
2nd place, silver medalist(s)	Edina Timár	Hungary	**653**	575					**213**					866
3rd place, bronze medalist(s)	Brigita Strelec	Slovenia	600	**638**	597	593			211	205	**223**	191	182	861
4	Cristina-Alexandra Samson	Romania	621	**641**	575				**212**					853
5	Renata Navrkalova	Czech Republic	624	**639**	561				**212**	184				851
6	Anita Mehesz	Hungary	607	592	**634**	605			200	**217**	185			851
7	Hana Wiedermannová	Czech Republic	603	**628**	606				197	**216**	196			844
8	Jasmina Anðelković	Serbia	633	612	**654**	571			186	**188**				842
9	Sina Beisser	Germany	611	616	628	611	**631**	617	**205**					836
10	Eva Sajko	Slovenia	**649**	590					**186**					835
11	Beata Włodarczyk	Poland	**591**						214	226	**238**	197	209	829
12	Sabrina Imbs	Germany	**591**						**235**					826
13	Renata Vilov	Serbia	**606**	597					206	**213**	176			819
14	Corinna Kastner	Germany	**618**	575					**200**	176				818
15	Anna Gyeresi	Romania	**607**	573	581				201	**210**				817
16	Marijana Liović	Croatia	**603**	591					**213**	198	198			816
17	Tatjana Zlojutro	Bosnia and Herzegovina	**598**	513					183	**211**	203	192		809
18	Heidi Poulsen	Denmark	**598**	537					**202**					800
19	Aneta Cvejnova	Czech Republic	614	605	609	594	593		**181**					795
20	Heret Ots	Estonia	**606**	550					**188**					794
21	Zorica Barać	Serbia	592	599	**613**				**179**					792
22	Katarina Valigurova	Slovakia	**608**	566					179	**180**				788
23	Anja Kozmus	Slovenia	**599**	589					**179**					778
24	Lenka Gordikova	Slovakia	**581**						**195**					776
25	Dana Klubertova	Slovakia	**578**						**196**	191				774
26	Aurelie Remy	France	**566**						**207**					773
27	Dominique Pumpler	Austria	**572**						**195**	167				767
28	Lisa Vsetecka	Austria	**576**						**190**					766
29	Adele Ainhauser	Italy	**580**						**184**					764
30	Marija Hamm	Montenegro	**559**						**187**	174				746
31	Gwennaelle Adler	France	**540**						**192**	158	206	162		746
32	Klara Sedlar	Croatia	626	**648**	585									648
33	Nataša Ravnić-Gasparini	Croatia	608	626	**640**	597	567							640
34	Petra Fegyveres	Hungary	**626**	621	606									626
35	Nikola Tatouskova	Czech Republic	612	591	**626**	605								626
36	Luminita Viorica Dogaru	Romania	595	**622**										622
37	Ana Jambrović	Croatia	592	**620**	676									620
38	Gabriela Rozsa-Drajko	Hungary	**615**	613										615
39	Marion Thaler	Italy	**610**	602										610
40	Annemarie Innerhofer	Italy	**610**	576										610
41	Anita Takacs	Hungary	**599**	561										599
42	Tatjana Dajić	Bosnia and Herzegovina	**593**	548										593
43	Dagmar Kyselicova	Slovakia	**590**											590
44	Mellina Zimmermann	Germany	**590**											590
45	Marija Kresović	Serbia	**589**											589
46	Dana Wiedermannová	Czech Republic	**586**											586
47	Simone Schneider	Germany	**586**											586
48	Irena Mejač	Slovenia	**586**											586
49	Ana Bacan	Croatia	**577**											577
50	Anita Sáfrány	Hungary	**574**											574
51	Joanna Lajtke	Poland	**574**											574
52	Daniela Kicker	Germany	**573**											573
53	Anja Ulaga	Slovenia	**572**											572
54	Daniela Lacatusu	Romania	**569**											569
55	Maria Saar	Estonia	**568**											568
56	Edith Pfattner	Italy	**565**											565
57	Dragana Lotina	Bosnia and Herzegovina	**563**											563
58	Nada Savić	Slovenia	**559**											559
59	Markéta Hofmanová	Czech Republic	**556**											556
60	Nataša Savić	Serbia	**549**											549
61	Neda Mijović	Montenegro	**544**											544
62	Maria Jönnsson	Sweden	**529**											529
63	Monika Nguyen	Austria	**526**											526
64	Christina Soerensen	Denmark	**519**											519
65	Carola Grütner	Italy							**158**					158

Key
Colour	Result
Red	Do not qualify (DNQ)
White	Do not participate (DNP)
Blank	No result (—)
Blank	Whithdrawn (WD)
Text formatting	Meaning
**Bold**	Best result
Italics	Comment
