= 2021 World Team Ninepin Bowling Classic Championships =

European bowling competition

9th nine-pin bowling World Team Championships
- Host city: Tarnowo Podgórne
- Country: Poland
- Nations: 14
- Sport: 9-pins
- Events: 2
- Opening: October 23, 2021
- Closing: October 30, 2021

Location in Europe
Location in Poland

The 2021 nine-pin bowling World Team Championships was the ninth edition of the team championships and held in Tarnowo Podgórne, Poland, in October 2021.

In men's tournament Serbia has secured gold medal, while in women's tournament world champion title was captured by Germany.

== Postponement and new bidding ==
Initially scheduled to take place from 19 May to 29 May 2021 and be held in Plauen, Germany, however, on August 31, 2020, the contract with the WNBA was terminated.

On December 21, WNBA announced that due to the COVID-19 pandemic, the championship scheduled for May will not be held. The event will not be moved to another date.

There were plans to organize the championships on special rules together with the youth championships in Kranj and Kamnik, but it was not approved by the national federations. On July 21, during the online conference, Tarnowo Podgórne was chosen as the host of the October competition as compensation for the championships not held a year earlier.

2021 World Team Championships bidding results
City	Nation	Votes
Tarnowo Podgórne	Poland	14
Munich	Germany	4
Kranj-Kamnik	Slovenia	WD

== Schedule ==
Two competitions was held.

All time are local (UTC+2).

Date	Time	Round
23 Oct 2021	11:00	Men group A & B games
23 Oct 2021	19:00	Opening ceremony
24 Oct 2021	08:00	Group stage
25 Oct 2021	08:00	Group stage
26 Oct 2021	08:00	Group stage
27 Oct 2021	08:00	Group stage
28 Oct 2021	08:00	Quarterfinals
29 Oct 2021	12:00	Semifinals
30 Oct 2021	10:00	Third place games
30 Oct 2021	14:00	Women Final
30 Oct 2021	16:30	Men Final
30 Oct 2021	19:30	Medal and closing ceremony

== Participating teams ==
=== Men ===
- Austria
- Bosnia and Herzegovina
- Croatia
- Czech Republic
- Estonia
- France
- Germany
- Hungary
- North Macedonia
- Poland
- Romania
- Serbia
- Slovakia
- Slovenia

=== Women ===
- Austria
- Bosnia and Herzegovina
- Croatia
- Czech Republic
- Estonia
- France
- Germany
- Hungary
- Poland
- Romania
- Serbia
- Slovakia
- Slovenia

== Medal summary ==
Event	Gold	Silver	Bronze
Men	Serbia; Čongor Baranj; Robert Ernješi; Bojan Kličarić; Igor Kovačić; Adrijan Lončarević; Aleksandar Milinković; Daniel Tepša; Radovan Vlajkov; Vilmoš Zavarko	Germany; Tim Brachtel; Florian Fritzmann; Timo Hoffmann; Manuel Lallinger; Dominik Kunze; Jürgen Pointinger; Daniel Schmid; Manuel Weiß; Christian Wilke	Croatia; Luka Bolanča; Mihael Grivičić; Alen Kujundžić; Matija Mance; Branko Manev; Hrvoje Marinović; Nikola Muše; Ivan Totić; Bojan Vlakevski
Women	Germany; Jana-Sophie Bachert; Sina Beißer; Alena Bimber; Anna Müller; Yvonne Schneider; Saskia Seitz; Sandra Sellner; Celine Zenker	Czech Republic; Jana Braunová; Helena Gruszková; Vlasta Kohoutová; Simona Koutníková; Kateřina Majerová; Dana Martinkevič; Natalia Tatoušková; Natalie Topičová; Hana Wiedermannová	Croatia; Ana Bacan-Schneider; Mirna Bosak; Valentina Gal; Amela Nicol Imširović; Marijana Liović; Ines Maričić; Milana Pavlić; Nataša Ravnić; Klara Sedlar

=== Medal table ===
Rank	Nation	Gold	Silver	Bronze	Total
1	Germany (GER)	1	1	0	2
2	Serbia (SRB)	1	0	0	1
3	Czech Republic (CZE)	0	1	0	1
4	Croatia (CRO)	0	0	2	2
Totals (4 entries)		2	2	2	6
