= 2022 World Singles Ninepin Bowling Classic Championships – Women's sprint =

Women's sprint at the 2022 World Singles Ninepin Bowling Classic Championships
- Location: Elva, Estonia
- Dates: 25 May 2022
- Competitors: 32 from 14 nations

Medalists
gold medal	Heret Ots	Estonia
silver medal	Hana Wiedermannová	Czech Republic
bronze medal	Jasmina Anđelković	Serbia
bronze medal	Eva Sajko	Slovenia

The women's sprint event at the 2022 World Singles Ninepin Bowling Classic Championships was held in Elva, Estonia on 25 May 2022.

World Champion became representative of host - Estonia Heret Ots thus winning the first world championship gold medal in history for his country. Silver was won by Czech Hana Wiedermannová, while bronze medals went to semi-finalists Serbian Jasmina Anđelković and Slovenian Eva Sajko.

== Results ==
=== Starting places ===
The starting places have been allocated on the basis of each nation achievements during the previous championships.

	(Austria) AUT	(Bosnia and Herzegovina) ~~BIH~~	(Croatia) CRO	(Czech Republic) CZE	(Denmark) DEN	(Estonia) EST	(France) FRA	(Germany) GER	(Hungary) HUN	(Italy) ITA	(Poland) POL	(Romania) ROU	(Serbia) SRB	(Slovakia) SVK	(Slovenia) SLO	(Sweden) SWE	Total
Number of seeds	1+2	0	1+2	1+2	1	1+1	1	1+2	1+2	1	1	1	1+2	1+1	1+2	1+1	32

=== Schedule ===
The players were drawn into bouts with the reservation that competitors from the same country can not play in the first round against each other.

Round of 32 - Wednesday, 25 May

Match #	Lanes	Player 1	Score	Player 2	Set 1	Set 2	SV
1st unit 09:00 (EEST)
SPW 1	1 – 2	(Croatia) Ines Maričić	2 – 0	(Sweden) Jenny Smevold	90 – 89	97 – 93	—N/a
SPW 2	3 – 4	(Slovenia) Irena Mejač	0 – 2	(Germany) Yvonne Schneider	102 – 110	106 – 108	—N/a
SPW 3	5 – 6	(Croatia) Valentina Gal	1 – 1	(Austria) Nicole Plamenig	83 – 85	109 – 101	62 – 63
SPW 4	7 – 8	(Croatia) Matea Juričić	1 – 1	(Serbia) Jasmina Anđelković	93 – 100	113 – 105	18 – 21
2nd unit 09:35 (EEST)
SPW 5	1 – 2	(Estonia) Heret Ots	2 – 0	(Slovakia) Dana Klubertová	97 – 100	104 – 88	23 – 22
SPW 6	3 – 4	(Poland) Nicoletta Dudziak	2 – 0	(Denmark) Bente Wiinberg	93 – 83	97 – 87	—N/a
SPW 7	5 – 6	(Estonia) Marian Saar	1 – 1	(Slovenia) Patricija Bizjak	104 – 92	103 – 111	18 – 23
SPW 8	7 – 8	(Czech Republic) Nikola Tatoušková	1 – 1	(Germany) Anna Müller	99 – 101	114 – 108	60 – 56
3rd unit 10:10 (EEST)
SPW 9	1 – 2	(Romania) Luminiţa Viorica Dogaru	1 – 1	(Hungary) Boglárka Hari	112 – 109	90 – 107	39 – 37
SPW 10	3 – 4	(Slovakia) Klaudia Pivková	0 – 2	(Italy) Laura Runggatscher	117 – 80	98 – 109	18 – 18
SPW 11	5 – 6	(Austria) Julia Huber	2 – 0	(Slovenia) Eva Sajko	88 – 102	104 – 102	19 – 18
SPW 12	7 – 8	(Sweden) Maria Jönnsson	0 – 2	(France) Margot Gribelin	87 – 115	79 – 85	—N/a
4th unit 10:45 (EEST)
SPW 13	1 – 2	(Serbia) Dijana Kormanjoš	1 – 1	(Hungary) Anita Méhész	103 – 84	105 – 120	20 – 24
SPW 14	3 – 4	(Czech Republic) Hana Wiedermannová	1 – 1	(Austria) Fiona Steiner	16 – 20	102 – 99	40 – 38
SPW 15	5 – 6	(Germany) Jana-Sophie Bachert	2 – 0	(Serbia) Ljiljana Frenc	102 – 100	117 – 98	—N/a
SPW 16	7 – 8	(Czech Republic) Jana Braunová	1 – 1	(Hungary) Katalin Tóth	84 – 105	107^{7} – 107^{5}	19 – 17

Round of 16 - Wednesday, 25 May

Match #	Lanes	Player 1	Score	Player 2	Set 1	Set 2	SV
1st unit 17:30 (EEST)
SPW 18	1 – 2	(Austria) Nicole Plamenig	0 – 2	(Serbia) Jasmina Anđelković	97 – 109	95 – 104	—N/a
SPW 20	3 – 4	(Slovenia) Patricija Bizjak	2 – 0	(Czech Republic) Nikola Tatoušková	97 – 85	107 – 94	—N/a
SPW 17	5 – 6	(Croatia) Ines Maričić	0 – 2	(Germany) Yvonne Schneider	89 – 99	95 – 99	—N/a
SPW 19	7 – 8	(Estonia) Heret Ots	1 – 1	(Poland) Nicoletta Dudziak	99 – 100	105 – 92	23 – 22
2nd unit 18:05 (EEST)
SPW 22	1 – 2	(Slovenia) Eva Sajko	1 – 1	(France) Margot Gribelin	88 – 104	102 – 89	19 – 18
SPW 24	3 – 4	(Germany) Jana-Sophie Bachert	1 – 1	(Czech Republic) Jana Braunová	107 – 101	92 – 98	25 – 20
SPW 21	5 – 6	(Romania) Luminiţa Viorica Dogaru	2 – 0	(Italy) Laura Runggatscher	111 – 95	122 – 90	—N/a
SPW 23	7 – 8	(Hungary) Anita Méhész	1 – 1	(Czech Republic) Hana Wiedermannová	117 – 82	93 – 113	63 – 65

Quarterfinals - Wednesday, 25 May

Match #	Lanes	Player 1	Score	Player 2	Set 1	Set 2	SV
1st unit 21:30 (EEST)
SPW 25	5 – 6	(Germany) Yvonne Schneider	0 – 2	(Serbia) Jasmina Anđelković	102 – 104	89 – 105	—N/a
SPW 27	7 – 8	(Romania) Luminiţa Viorica Dogaru	1 – 1	(Slovenia) Eva Sajko	95 – 107	95 – 87	16 – 25
2nd unit 22:05 (EEST)
SPW 26	5 – 6	(Estonia) Heret Ots	1 – 1	(Slovenia) Patricija Bizjak	88 – 100	91 – 109	21 – 17
SPW 28	7 – 8	(Czech Republic) Hana Wiedermannová	2 – 0	(Germany) Jana-Sophie Bachert	114 – 103	120 – 102	—N/a

Semifinals - Wednesday, 25 May

Match #	Lanes	Player 1	Score	Player 2	Set 1	Set 2	SV
23:15 (EEST)
SPW 30	5 – 6	(Slovenia) Eva Sajko	1 – 1	(Czech Republic) Hana Wiedermannová	92 – 111	108 – 103	21 – 23
SPW 29	7 – 8	(Serbia) Jasmina Anđelković	1 – 1	(Estonia) Heret Ots	121 – 91	101 – 108	17 – 22

Final - Wednesday, 25 May

Match #	Lanes	Player 1	Score	Player 2	Set 1	Set 2	SV
23:50 (EEST)
SPW 31	7 – 8	(Estonia) Heret Ots	2 – 0	(Czech Republic) Hana Wiedermannová	96 – 89	108 – 103	—N/a

=== Draw ===
Round of 32
(Croatia) Ines Maričić	2
(Sweden) Jenny Smevold	0
(Slovenia) Irena Mejač	0
(Germany) Yvonne Schneider	2
(Croatia) Valentina Gal	1	62
(Austria) Nicole Plamenig	1	63
(Croatia) Matea Juričić	1	18
(Serbia) Jasmina Anđelković	1	21
(Estonia) Heret Ots	1	23
(Slovakia) Dana Klubertová	1	22
(Poland) Nicoletta Dudziak	2
(Denmark) Bente Wiinberg	0
(Estonia) Marian Saar	1	18
(Slovenia) Patricija Bizjak	1	23
(Czech Republic) Nikola Tatoušková	1	60
(Germany) Anna Müller	1	56
(Romania) Luminiţa Viorica Dogaru	1	39
(Hungary) Boglárka Hari	1	37
(Slovakia) Klaudia Pivková	1	18
(Italy) Laura Runggatscher	1	19
(Austria) Julia Huber	1	19
(Slovenia) Eva Sajko	1	20
(Sweden) Maria Jönnsson	0
(France) Margot Gribelin	2
(Serbia) Dijana Kormanjoš	1	20
(Hungary) Anita Méhész	1	24
(Czech Republic) Hana Wiedermannová	1	40
(Austria) Fiona Steiner	1	38
(Germany) Jana-Sophie Bachert	2
(Serbia) Liljana Frenc	0
(Czech Republic) Jana Braunová	1	19
(Hungary) Katalin Tóth	1	17

Round of 16
(Croatia) Ines Maričić	0
(Germany) Yvonne Schneider	2
(Austria) Nicole Plamenig	0
(Serbia) Jasmina Anđelković	2
(Estonia) Heret Ots	1	23
(Poland) Nicoletta Dudziak	1	22
(Slovenia) Patricija Bizjak	2
(Czech Republic) Nikola Tatoušková	0
(Romania) Luminiţa Viorica Dogaru	2
(Italy) Laura Runggatscher	0
(Slovenia) Eva Sajko	1	19
(France) Margot Gribelin	1	18
(Hungary) Anita Méhész	1	63
(Czech Republic) Hana Wiedermannová	1	65
(Germany) Jana-Sophie Bachert	1	25
(Czech Republic) Jana Braunová	1	20

Quarterfinals
(Germany) Yvonne Schneider	0
(Serbia) Jasmina Anđelković	2
(Estonia) Heret Ots	1	21
(Slovenia) Patricija Bizjak	1	17
(Romania) Luminiţa Viorica Dogaru	1	16
(Slovenia) Eva Sajko	1	25
(Czech Republic) Hana Wiedermannová	2
(Germany) Jana-Sophie Bachert	0

Semifinals
(Serbia) Jasmina Anđelković	1	17
(Estonia) Heret Ots	1	22
(Slovenia) Eva Sajko	1	21
(Czech Republic) Hana Wiedermannová	1	23

Final
(Estonia) Heret Ots	2
(Czech Republic) Hana Wiedermannová	0
