= 2018 World Singles Ninepin Bowling Classic Championships – Mixed tandem =

Mixed tandem at the 2018 World Singles Ninepin Bowling Classic Championships
- Location: Cluj-Napoca, Romania
- Dates: 22–23 May 2018
- Competitors: 64 from 16 nations

Medalists
gold medal	Renáta Navrkalová; Jan Endršt	Czech Republic
silver medal	Ana Jambrović; Hrvoje Marinović	Croatia
bronze medal	Ramona Lienbacher; Philipp Vsetecka	Austria
bronze medal	Tilda Duka; Petruţ Ovidiu Mihălcioiu	Romania

The mixed tandem event at the 2018 World Singles Ninepin Bowling Classic Championships was held in Cluj-Napoca, Romania on 22–23 May 2018. The first round took place after ending of the sprint events. Rest part was played the next day.

The new world champions in mixed tandems became the Czechs Renáta Navrkalová and Jan Endršt. The silver medals went to Croatian Ana Jambrović and Hrvoje Marinović, while the bronzes were won by Austrians Ramona Lienbacher and Philipp Vsetecka, and Romanians Tilda Duka and Petruţ Ovidiu Mihălcioiu.

== Results ==
=== Starting places ===
The starting places have been allocated on the basis of each team's achievements during the previous championships.

	(Austria) AUT	(Bosnia and Herzegovina) BIH	(Croatia) CRO	(Czech Republic) CZE	(Denmark) DEN	(Estonia) EST	(France) FRA	(Germany) GER	(Hungary) HUN	(Italy) ITA	(North Macedonia) MKD	(Poland) POL	(Romania) ROU	(Slovenia) SLO	(Serbia) SRB	(Slovakia) SVK	Total
Number of seeds	3	1	2	2	1	2	1	2	3	1	1	1	3	2	4	3	32

=== Draw ===
The tandems were drawn into bouts with the reservation that pair from the same country can not play in the first round against each other.

Round of 32; 22 May
(Czech Republic) Renáta Navrkalová (Czech Republic) Jan Endršt	2
(Hungary) Anita Dallosné Takács (Hungary) Károly Kozma	0
(Romania) Luminita Viorica Dogaru (Romania) Nicolae Lupu	1	15
(Denmark) Anni Johnna Malm (Denmark) Peter Wiinberg Soerensen	1	13
(France) Aurélie Remy (France) Guillaume Changenet	1	11
(Serbia) Marijana Oros (Serbia) Radovan Vlajkov	1	13
(Germany) Alina Dollheimer (Germany) Mathias Dirnberger	1	9
(Hungary) Dorottya Bordács (Hungary) Zoltan Flavius Fehér	1	17
(Czech Republic) Veronika Petrov (Czech Republic) Filip Dejda	0
(Germany) Melina Zimmermann (Germany) Manuel Weiß	2
(Serbia) Marija Kresović (Serbia) Milan Jovetić	0
(Poland) Anna Chwastyniak (Poland) Piotr Kieliba	2
(Austria) Nicole Plamenig (Austria) Markus Vsetecka	2
(Slovakia) Klaudia Pivková (Slovakia) Erik Kuna	0
(Estonia) Enikö Tot (Estonia) Georg Righi	0
(Austria) Ramona Lienbacher (Austria) Philipp Vsetecka	2
(Hungary) Anita Sáfrány (Hungary) László Karsai	0
(Slovakia) Maria Tomková (Slovakia) Martin Kozák	2
(Slovenia) Eva Sajko (Slovenia) Gregor Bajželj	2
(Slovakia) Gabriela Kuchárová (Slovakia) Bystrik Vadović	0
(Croatia) Ana Jambrović (Croatia) Hrvoje Marinović	2
(Austria) Monika Lengauer (Austria) Alexander Tischler	0
(Italy) Laura Runggatscher (Italy) Armin Egger	2
(Estonia) Gertrud Saetalu (Estonia) Marek Sööt	0
(Slovenia) Petra Bašek (Slovenia) Matej Lepej	1	28
(Serbia) Zorica Barać (Serbia) Daniel Tepša	1	27
(Bosnia and Herzegovina) Maja Kovačević (Bosnia and Herzegovina) Marko Trklja	0
(Romania) Daniela Lacatusu (Romania) Ion Cercel	2
(Serbia) Milana Pavlić (Serbia) Dario Radoš	0
(Romania) Tilda Duka (Romania) Petruţ Ovidiu Mihălcioiu	2
(Croatia) Valentina Gal Mesarić (Croatia) Mario Liović	0
(North Macedonia) Bilijana Gavrilova (North Macedonia) Boris Benedik	2

Round of 16; 23 May
(Czech Republic) Renáta Navrkalová (Czech Republic) Jan Endršt	2
(Romania) Luminita Viorica Dogaru (Romania) Nicolae Lupu	0
(Serbia) Marijana Oros (Serbia) Radovan Vlajkov	2
(Hungary) Dorottya Bordács (Hungary) Zoltan Flavius Fehér	0
(Germany) Melina Zimmermann (Germany) Manuel Weiß	2
(Poland) Anna Chwastyniak (Poland) Piotr Kieliba	0
(Austria) Nicole Plamenig (Austria) Markus Vsetecka	1	10
(Austria) Ramona Lienbacher (Austria) Philipp Vsetecka	1	12
(Slovakia) Maria Tomková (Slovakia) Martin Kozák	1	10
(Slovenia) Eva Sajko (Slovenia) Gregor Bajželj	1	12
(Croatia) Ana Jambrović (Croatia) Hrvoje Marinović	2
(Italy) Laura Runggatscher (Italy) Armin Egger	0
(Slovenia) Petra Bašek (Slovenia) Matej Lepej	1	16
(Romania) Daniela Lacatusu (Romania) Ion Cercel	1	11
(Romania) Tilda Duka (Romania) Petruţ Ovidiu Mihălcioiu	1	13
(North Macedonia) Bilijana Gavrilova (North Macedonia) Boris Benedik	1	11

Quarterfinals; 23 May
(Czech Republic) Renáta Navrkalová (Czech Republic) Jan Endršt	1	17
(Serbia) Marijana Oros (Serbia) Radovan Vlajkov	1	12
(Germany) Melina Zimmermann (Germany) Manuel Weiß	0
(Austria) Ramona Lienbacher (Austria) Philipp Vsetecka	2
(Slovenia) Eva Sajko (Slovenia) Gregor Bajželj	0
(Croatia) Ana Jambrović (Croatia) Hrvoje Marinović	2
(Slovenia) Petra Bašek (Slovenia) Matej Lepej	1	22
(Romania) Tilda Duka (Romania) Petruţ Ovidiu Mihălcioiu	1	23

Semifinals; 23 May
(Czech Republic) Renáta Navrkalová (Czech Republic) Jan Endršt	1	16
(Austria) Ramona Lienbacher (Austria) Philipp Vsetecka	1	10
(Croatia) Ana Jambrović (Croatia) Hrvoje Marinović	2
(Romania) Tilda Duka (Romania) Petruţ Ovidiu Mihălcioiu	0

Final; 23 May
(Czech Republic) Renáta Navrkalová (Czech Republic) Jan Endršt	1	14
(Croatia) Ana Jambrović (Croatia) Hrvoje Marinović	1	12
