= 2018 World Singles Ninepin Bowling Classic Championships – Women's sprint =

Women's sprint at the 2018 World Singles Ninepin Bowling Classic Championships
- Location: Cluj-Napoca, Romania
- Dates: 23 May 2018
- Competitors: 32 from 17 nations

Medalists
gold medal	(Croatia) Ines Maričić
silver medal	(Croatia) Mirna Bosak
bronze medal	(Hungary) Anita Méhész
bronze medal	(Sweden) Jenny Smevold

The women's sprint event at the 2018 World Singles Ninepin Bowling Classic Championships was held in Cluj-Napoca, Romania on 23 May 2018.

The defender of the title was the Pole Beata Włodarczyk, who did not take off in Cluj after the end of her career and therefore did not have the opportunity to defend the championship. The new champion of the world became Croatian Ines Maričić, after defeated her compatriot Mirna Bosak in final. The bronze medals was won by Hungarian Anita Méhész and Swedish Jenny Smevold.

== Results ==
=== Starting places ===
The starting places have been allocated on the basis of each team's achievements during the previous championships.

	(Austria) AUT	(Bosnia and Herzegovina) BIH	(Croatia) CRO	(Czech Republic) CZE	(Denmark) DEN	(Estonia) EST	(France) FRA	(Germany) GER	(Hungary) HUN	(Italy) ITA	(North Macedonia) MKD	(Poland) POL	(Romania) ROU	(Slovenia) SLO	(Serbia) SRB	(Slovakia) SVK	(Sweden) SWE	Total
Number of seeds	1	1	3	3	1	1	1	1	2	1	1	2	2	2	3	1	1	32

=== Draw ===
The players were drawn into pairs with the reservation that competitors from the same country can not play in the first round against each other.

Round of 32
(Austria) Nicole Plamenig	1	14
(Slovakia) Dana Klubertová	1	23
(Slovenia) Eva Sajko	1	18
(Hungary) Irén Nemes	1	21
(Hungary) Edit Sass	0
(Serbia) Jasmina Anđelković	2
(North Macedonia) Biljana Gavrilova	0
(Hungary) Anita Méhész	2
(Germany) Sina Beißer	2
(Italy) Nathalie Profanter	0
(Slovenia) Brigita Strelec	2
(Germany) Corinna Kastner	0
(Croatia) Ana Jambrović	1	21
(Denmark) Ena Emma Bargholz	1	20
(Croatia) Ines Maričić	2
(Czech Republic) Nikola Tatoušková	0
(Croatia) Mirna Bosak	2
(France) Aurélie Remy	0	DSQ
(Austria) Ramona Lienbacher	2
(Romania) Luminita Viorica Dogaru	0
(Poland) Anna Chwastyniak	0
(Bosnia and Herzegovina) Tatjana Zlojutro	2
(Czech Republic) Lucie Vaverková	2
(Romania) Daniela Lacatusu	0
(Serbia) Zorica Barać	1	35
(Germany) Simone Schneider	1	33
(Sweden) Jenny Smevold	2
(Slovakia) Katarína Valigurová	0
(Serbia) Maja Đukić	1	24
(Czech Republic) Alena Kantnerová	1	21
(Poland) Kinga Konopa	0
(Estonia) Heret Ots	2

Round of 16
(Slovakia) Dana Klubertová	0
(Hungary) Irén Nemes	2
(Serbia) Jasmina Anđelković	0
(Hungary) Anita Méhész	2
(Germany) Sina Beißer	2
(Slovenia) Brigita Strelec	0
(Croatia) Ana Jambrović	0
(Croatia) Ines Maričić	2
(Croatia) Mirna Bosak	2
(Austria) Ramona Lienbacher	0
(Bosnia and Herzegovina) Tatjana Zlojutro	1	19
(Czech Republic) Lucie Vaverková	1	22
(Serbia) Zorica Barać	1	34
(Sweden) Jenny Smevold	1	38
(Serbia) Maja Đukić	1	18
(Estonia) Heret Ots	1	20

Quarterfinals
(Hungary) Irén Nemes	0
(Hungary) Anita Méhész	2
(Germany) Sina Beißer	0
(Croatia) Ines Maričić	2
(Croatia) Mirna Bosak	1	21
(Czech Republic) Lucie Vaverková	1	19
(Sweden) Jenny Smevold	1	19
(Estonia) Heret Ots	1	17

Semifinals
(Hungary) Anita Méhész	0
(Croatia) Ines Maričić	2
(Croatia) Mirna Bosak	2
(Sweden) Jenny Smevold	0

Final
(Croatia) Ines Maričić	1	23
(Croatia) Mirna Bosak	1	20
