= 2018 World Singles Ninepin Bowling Classic Championships – Women's combined =

Women's combined at the 2018 World Singles Ninepin Bowling Classic Championships
- Location: Cluj-Napoca, Romania
- Dates: 21-26 May 2018
- Competitors: 67 from 17 nations
- Winning score: 890

Medalists
gold medal	(Serbia) Jasmina Anđelković
silver medal	(Croatia) Ines Maričić
bronze medal	(Croatia) Mirna Bosak

The women's combined event at the 2018 World Singles Ninepin Bowling Classic Championships was held in Cluj-Napoca, Romania from 21 May to 26 May 2018.

== Results ==
The result for the combined was the sum of best results from a single starts in the single classic and sprint.

Rank	Name	Country	Single classic						Sprint					Total
Rank	Name	Country	Q	1/16	1/8	1/4	1/2	F	1/16	1/8	1/4	1/2	F	Total
1st place, gold medalist(s)	Jasmina Anđelković	Serbia	640	**670**	607	580			**220**	188				890
2nd place, silver medalist(s)	Ines Maričić	Croatia	620	584	**660**	631	645		200	**228**	194	211	208	888
3rd place, bronze medalist(s)	Mirna Bosak	Croatia	581	**665**	622				—	202	196	**211**	207	876
4	Anita Méhész	Hungary	607	611	**647**	647	647	594	203	**227**	211	195		874
5	Brigita Strelec	Slovenia	602	624	**652**	589	610		**220**	186				872
6	Ana Jambrović	Croatia	604	620	**677**	625			**182**	179				859
7	Lucie Vaverková	Czech Republic	606	602	604	**633**			**222**	176	196			855
8	Sina Beißer	Germany	585	607	606	610	612	**617**	213	**214**	181			831
9	Maja Đukić	Serbia	587	**606**	573				**213**	196				819
10	Katarína Valigurová	Slovakia	603	**626**	576				**186**					812
11	Zorica Barać	Serbia	**601**	572	559				**210**	182				811
12	Eva Sajko	Slovenia	597	**604**					**204**					808
13	Irén Nemes	Hungary	**577**	543					199	191	**231**			808
14	Edit Sass	Hungary	590	**622**	609				**185**					807
15	Alena Kantnerová	Czech Republic	583	557	595	**603**			**209**					812
16	Corinna Kastner	Germany	579	**606**					**193**					799
17	Heret Ots	Estonia	**566**						**225**	207	181			791
18	Ramona Lienbacher	Austria	**558**						**230**	185				788
19	Nikola Tatoušková	Czech Republic	581	**599**					**188**					787
20	Luminita Viorica Dogaru	Romania	578	**604**	550				**182**					786
21	Kinga Konopa	Poland	**600**	602					**179**					781
22	Dana Klubertová	Slovakia	**600**	535					173	**174**				774
23	Simone Schneider	Germany	**574**						**193**					767
24	Nicole Plamenig	Austria	**571**						**193**					764
25	Tatjana Zlojutro	Bosnia and Herzegovina	**556**						**200**	191				756
26	Nathalie Profanter	Italy	**572**						**181**					753
27	Daniela Lacatusu	Romania	**570**						**182**					752
28	Ena Emma Bargholz	Denmark	**479**						**184**					663
29	Anja Forštnarič	Slovenia	594	**646**	574									646
30	Anita Dallosné Takács	Hungary	576	**615**										615
31	Maria Ciobanu	Romania	**605**	489										605
32	Patricija Bizjak	Slovenia	**605**	538										605
33	Milana Pavlić	Serbia	**602**	577										602
34	Petra Bašek	Slovenia	**602**	570										602
35	Zuzana Musilová	Czech Republic	580	**598**										598
36	Klaudia Pivkova	Slovakia	**590**	585										590
37	Daniela Kicker	Germany	**590**	587										590
38	Tihana Čavlović	Croatia	**583**	568										583
39	Dagmar Wiedenhofer	Italy	**579**	544	569									579
40	Veronika Petrov	Czech Republic	**577**	546										577
41	Renáta Navrkalová	Czech Republic	**576**											576
42	Melina Zimmermann	Germany	**574**											574
43	Nataša Ravnić-Gašparini	Croatia	**574**											574
44	Alina Dollheimer	Germany	**572**											572
45	Aurélie Remy	France	**567**											567
46	Enikö Tot	Italy	**567**											567
47	Andrea Mioara Baiocianu	Romania	**566**											566
48	Anita Sáfrány	Hungary	**566**											566
49	Laura Runggatscher	Italy	**565**											565
50	Gertrud Saetalu	Estonia	**561**											561
51	Marijana Oros	Serbia	**561**											561
52	Marija Kresović	Serbia	**561**											561
53	Maja Kovačević	Bosnia and Herzegovina	**560**											560
54	Maria Tomková	Slovakia	**558**											558
55	Monika Lengauer	Austria	**558**											558
56	Dorottya Bordács	Hungary	**553**											553
57	Tanja Trpkovska	Macedonia	**551**											551
58	Gabriela Kuchárová	Slovakia	**544**											544
59	Irena Mejač	Slovenia	**543**											543
60	Triinu Saetalu	Estonia	**542**											542
61	Renata Vilov	Serbia	**522**											522
62	Tatjana Perišić	Bosnia and Herzegovina	**520**											520
63	Ani Johnna Malm	Denmark	**500**											500
64	Maria Jönnsson	Sweden	**485**											485
65	Jenny Smevold	Sweden							**211**	178	184	182		211
66	Bilijana Gavrilova	Macedonia							**189**					189
67	Anna Chwastyniak	Poland							**189**					189

Key
Colour	Result
Red	Do not qualify (DNQ)
Black	Disqualified (DSQ)
White	Do not participate (DNP)
Blank	No result (—)
Blank	Whithdrawn (WD)
Text formatting	Meaning
**Bold**	Best result
Italics	Comment
