= 2021 World Team Ninepin Bowling Classic Championships – Women's tournament =

Tournament details
- Host country: Poland
- City: Tarnowo Podgórne
- Venue: 1 (in 1 host city)
- Dates: 24–30 Oct
- Teams: 13

Final positions
- Champions: Germany (3rd title)
- Runners-up: Czech Republic
- Third place: Croatia
- Fourth place: Serbia

Tournament statistics
- Matches played: 23
- Top scorers: Player: (Czech Republic) Nikola Tatoušková 673; Team: Germany 3723

The women's tournament at the 2021 World Team Ninepin Bowling Classic Championships was held in Tarnowo Podgórne, Poland, from 24 to 30 May 2021.

Germany captured their third title by defeating Czech Republic 7–1 in the final match. Bronze was secured by Croatia who beat Serbia 5–3.

== Participating teams ==
13 associations applied to participate in the women's teams competition.

- Austria
- Bosnia and Herzegovina
- Croatia
- Czech Republic
- Estonia
- France
- Germany
- Hungary
- Poland
- Romania
- Serbia
- Slovakia
- Slovenia

=== Draw ===
Groups were drawn on August 27, 2021 during the technical briefing in Kranj.

| Pot 1 | Pot 2 | Pot 3 |
|---|---|---|
| Croatia; Czech Republic; Germany; Hungary | Austria; Romania; Slovenia; Serbia | Bosnia and Herzegovina; Estonia; France; Poland (hosts); Slovakia |

=== Groups ===
| Group A | Group B | Group C | Group D |
|---|---|---|---|
| Croatia; Romania; Slovakia; Estonia | Germany; Serbia; France | Czech Republic; Austria; Bosnia and Herzegovina | Hungary; Slovenia; Poland (hosts) |

== Group stage ==
=== Group A ===
| | | Pts | Matches | | | Team points | | Set points | | Qualification |
| Rank | Team | Pts | W | D | L | W | L | W | L | Qualification |
|---|---|---|---|---|---|---|---|---|---|---|
| 1 | Croatia | 6 | 3 | 0 | 0 | 24 | 0 | 60 | 12 | Advance to quarterfinals |
| 2 | Romania | 4 | 2 | 0 | 1 | 13 | 11 | 35.5 | 36.5 | Advance to quarterfinals |
| 3 | Slovakia | 2 | 1 | 0 | 2 | 6 | 18 | 24.5 | 47.5 | |
| 4 | Estonia | 0 | 0 | 0 | 3 | 5 | 19 | 24 | 48 | |

24 Oct 2021
15:00 CEST

| Croatia | 8 - 0 | Estonia |
|---|---|---|
| 3668 20.0 | Report | 4.0 3310 |
| Valentina Gal 626 3.0 | | 1.0 529 Kaidi Kirs |
| Ines Maričić 597 4.0 | | 0.0 561 Karin Abel |
| Klara Sedlar 607 3.0 | | 0.0 534 Heret Ots |
| Amela Nicol Imširović 641 3.0 | | 1.0 605 Gertrud Orrin |
| ( (substituted on) 61 Marijana Liović) Mirna Bosak 594 3.0 | | 1.0 540 Triinu Saetalu |
| ( (substituted on) 61 Nataša Ravnić) Milana Pavlić 603 4.0 | | 0.0 541 Kertu Rohumägi |

ZST Hall, Tarnowo Podgórne
Head referee: Mitja Hudovernik

24 Oct 2021
18:30 CEST

| Romania | 7 - 1 | Slovakia |
|---|---|---|
| 3382 15.0 | Report | 9.0 3300 |
| Daniela Lăcătuşu 536 3.0 | | 1.0 522 Monika Šintálová |
| Alina Ştefania Sanda 593 1.0 | | 3.0 588 Vladimíra Vávrová |
| Georgiana Alice Vasile 552 3.0 | | 1.0 526 Alexandra Duračková |
| Réka Fekete 564 3.0 | | 1.0 556 Jana Poliaková |
| Noemi Budoi 536 2.0 | | 2.0 533 Mária Tomková |
| Luminiţa Viorica Dogaru 601 3.0 | | 1.0 575 Klaudia Pivková |

ZST Hall, Tarnowo Podgórne
Head referee: Mitja Hudovernik

25 Oct 2021
15:00 CEST

| Slovakia | 0 - 8 | Croatia |
|---|---|---|
| 3346 3.0 | Report | 21.0 3624 |
| Klaudia Pivková 531 1.0 | | 4.0 612 Marijana Liović |
| Lenka Tranová 535 0.0 | | 4.0 580 Ana Bacan-Schneider |
| Natalia Šintálová 573 1.0 | | 3.0 622 Ines Maričić |
| Jana Poliaková 575 1.0 | | 3.0 611 Valentina Gal |
| Vladimíra Vávrová 583 1.0 | | 3.0 566 Milana Pavlić ( (substituted on) 91 Klara Sedlar) |
| Alexandra Duračková 549 0.0 | | 4.0 633 Nataša Ravnić |

ZST Hall, Tarnowo Podgórne
Head referee: Mitja Hudovernik

25 Oct 2021
18:30 CEST

| Romania | 6 - 2 | Estonia |
|---|---|---|
| 3394 15.5 | Report | 8.5 3229 |
| Daniela Lăcătuşu 566 2.5 | | 1.5 542 Gertrud Orrin |
| Alina Ştefania Sanda 549 2.0 | | 2.0 556 Heret Ots |
| Georgiana Alice Vasile 546 2.0 | | 2.0 507 Triinu Saetalu |
| Réka Fekete 603 4.0 | | 0.0 497 Carmen Klein |
| Noemi Budoi 524 1.0 | | 3.0 563 Liilia Tõnisson |
| Luminiţa Viorica Dogaru 606 4.0 | | 0.0 564 Kertu Rohumägi |

ZST Hall, Tarnowo Podgórne
Head referee: Mitja Hudovernik

26 Oct 2021
11:30 CEST

| Slovakia | 5 - 3 | Estonia |
|---|---|---|
| 3349 12.5 | Report | 11.5 3306 |
| Natalia Šintálová 539 1.0 | | 3.0 518 Karin Abel |
| Jana Poliaková 571 1.5 | | 2.5 577 Heret Ots |
| Lenka Tranová 574 3.0 | | 1.0 546 Kaidi Kirs |
| Alexandra Duračková 574 3.0 | | 1.0 504 Carmen Klein |
| Klaudia Pivková 583 3.0 | | 1.0 583 Liilia Tõnisson |
| Vladimíra Vávrová 546 1.0 | | 3.0 578 Gerturd Orrin |

ZST Hall, Tarnowo Podgórne
Head referee: Mitja Hudovernik

27 Oct 2021
08:00 CEST

| Croatia | 8 - 0 | Romania |
|---|---|---|
| 3805 19.0 | Report | 5.0 3436 |
| Amela Nicol Imširović 660 3.0 | | 1.0 578 Georgiana Alice Vasile |
| Valentina Gal 649 2.0 | | 2.0 624 Daniela Lăcătuşu |
| Mirna Bosak 623 3.0 | | 1.0 569 Alina Ştefania Sanda |
| Marijana Liović 606 4.0 | | 0.0 537 Roxana-Andreea Bordianu |
| Nataša Ravnić 631 3.0 | | 1.0 594 Réka Fekete |
| Ines Maričić 636 4.0 | | 0.0 534 Luminiţa Viorica Dogaru ( (substituted on) 49 Noemi Budoi) |

ZST Hall, Tarnowo Podgórne
Head referee: Mitja Hudovernik

=== Group B ===
| | | Pts | Matches | | | Team points | | Set points | | Qualification |
| Rank | Team | Pts | W | D | L | W | L | W | L | Qualification |
|---|---|---|---|---|---|---|---|---|---|---|
| 1 | Germany | 4 | 2 | 0 | 0 | 15 | 1 | 37 | 11 | Advance to quarterfinals |
| 2 | Serbia | 2 | 1 | 0 | 1 | 6 | 10 | 18 | 30 | Advance to quarterfinals |
| 3 | France | 0 | 0 | 0 | 2 | 3 | 13 | 17 | 31 | |

24 Oct 2021
11:30 CEST

| Serbia | 5 - 3 | France |
|---|---|---|
| 3434 11.0 | Report | 13.0 3415 |
| Kristina Ljubenković 575 2.0 | | 2.0 569 Lauren Carminati |
| Olivera Čikoš 548 0.0 | | 4.0 592 Aurélie Remy |
| Jasmina Anđelković 600 2.0 | | 2.0 602 Stéphanie Rauscher |
| Dijana Kormanjoš 582 3.0 | | 1.0 546 Sandrine Bouton |
| Ljiljana Frenc 563 2.0 | | 2.0 532 Lya Klenkle |
| Višnja Živanović 566 2.0 | | 2.0 574 Amélie Zind |

ZST Hall, Tarnowo Podgórne
Head referee: Mitja Hudovernik

26 Oct 2021
08:00 CEST

| France | 0 - 8 | Germany |
|---|---|---|
| 3363 4.0 | Report | 20.0 3753 |
| Aurélie Remy 581 0.0 | | 4.0 637 Sina Beißer |
| Lauren Carminati 559 1.0 | | 2.0 628 Celine Zenker |
| Sandrine Bouton 524 1.0 | | 3.0 612 Anna Müller |
| Stéphanie Rauscher 559 0.0 | | 4.0 604 Sandra Sellner |
| Amélie Zind 597 2.0 | | 2.0 635 Alena Bimber |
| Laetitia Hert 543 0.0 | | 4.0 637 Saskia Seitz ( (substituted on) 61 Yvonne Schneider) |

ZST Hall, Tarnowo Podgórne
Head referee: Mitja Hudovernik

27 Oct 2021
11:30 CEST

| Germany | 7 - 1 | Serbia |
|---|---|---|
| 3675 17.0 | Report | 7.0 3517 |
| Celine Zenker 576 2.0 | | 2.0 591 Višnja Živanović |
| Sina Beißer 641 4.0 | | 0.0 612 Kristina Ljubenković |
| Sandra Sellner 610 2.0 | | 2.0 591 Jasmina Anđelković |
| Anna Müller 607 3.0 | | 1.0 562 Vladana Obrenić |
| Alena Bimber 612 3.0 | | 1.0 594 Dijana Kormanjoš ( (substituted on) 61 Kristina Trošić) |
| ( (substituted on) 91 Jana-Sophie Bachert) Saskia Seitz 629 3.0 | | 1.0 567 Olivera Čikoš ( (substituted on) 61 Ljiljana Frenc) |

ZST Hall, Tarnowo Podgórne
Head referee: Mitja Hudovernik

=== Group C ===
| | | Pts | Matches | | | Team points | | Set points | | Qualification |
| Rank | Team | Pts | W | D | L | W | L | W | L | Qualification |
|---|---|---|---|---|---|---|---|---|---|---|
| 1 | Czech Republic | 4 | 2 | 0 | 0 | 15 | 1 | 39 | 9 | Advance to quarterfinals |
| 2 | Austria | 2 | 1 | 0 | 1 | 5 | 11 | 16 | 32 | Advance to quarterfinals |
| 3 | Bosnia and Herzegovina | 0 | 0 | 0 | 2 | 4 | 12 | 17 | 31 | |

25 Oct 2021
08:00 CEST

| Austria | 5 - 3 | Bosnia and Herzegovina |
|---|---|---|
| 3392 13.0 | Report | 11.0 3371 |
| Fiona Steiner 575 2.5 | | 1.5 567 Maja Kovačević |
| Vanessa Laibacher 576 1.0 | | 3.0 580 Renata Kozlina |
| Monika Nguyen 584 2.5 | | 1.5 554 Jelena Jojinović |
| Nathalie Neubauer 571 2.0 | | 2.0 586 Tatjana Zlojutro |
| Monika Lengauer 588 4.0 | | 0.0 527 Minela Češko |
| ( (substituted on) 61 Karin Niederwimmer) Nicole Plamenig 498 1.0 | | 3.0 557 Dragana Lotina |

ZST Hall, Tarnowo Podgórne
Head referee: Mitja Hudovernik

26 Oct 2021
15:00 CEST

| Bosnia and Herzegovina | 1 - 7 | Czech Republic |
|---|---|---|
| 3268 6.0 | Report | 18.0 3593 |
| Maja Kovačević 558 1.0 | | 3.0 626 Dana Martinkevič |
| Renata Kozlina 544 0.0 | | 4.0 622 Nikola Tatoušková |
| Minela Češko 528 1.0 | | 3.0 563 Vlasta Kohoutová |
| Tatjana Zlojutro 551 1.0 | | 3.0 621 Natálie Topičová |
| Jelena Jojinović 567 3.0 | | 1.0 568 Helena Gruszková ( (substituted on) 61 Simona Koutníková) |
| ( (substituted on) 31 Tatjana Perišić) Dragana Lotina 520 0.0 | | 4.0 593 Hana Wiedermannová ( (substituted on) 61 Kateřina Majerová) |

ZST Hall, Tarnowo Podgórne
Head referee: Mitja Hudovernik

27 Oct 2021
15:00 CEST

| Czech Republic | 8 - 0 | Austria |
|---|---|---|
| 3664 21.0 | Report | 3.0 3414 |
| Nikola Tatoušková 673 4.0 | | 0.0 572 Monika Lengauer |
| Dana Martinkevič 624 4.0 | | 0.0 572 Fiona Steiner |
| Natálie Topičová 608 3.0 | | 1.0 586 Nathalie Neubauer |
| Kateřina Majerová 568 3.0 | | 1.0 549 Monika Nguyen |
| Hana Wiedermannová 619 4.0 | | 0.0 555 Nicola Plamenig ( (substituted on) 80 Sarah Walch) |
| ( (substituted on) 91 Jana Braunová) Simona Koutníková 572 3.0 | | 1.0 580 Vanessa Laibacher |

ZST Hall, Tarnowo Podgórne
Head referee: Mitja Hudovernik

=== Group D ===
| | | Pts | Matches | | | Team points | | Set points | | Qualification |
| Rank | Team | Pts | W | D | L | W | L | W | L | Qualification |
|---|---|---|---|---|---|---|---|---|---|---|
| 1 | Hungary | 4 | 2 | 0 | 0 | 12 | 4 | 33 | 15 | Advance to quarterfinals |
| 2 | Slovenia | 2 | 1 | 0 | 1 | 9 | 7 | 19 | 29 | Advance to quarterfinals |
| 3 | Poland (H) | 0 | 0 | 0 | 2 | 3 | 13 | 20 | 28 | |

25 Oct 2021
11:30 CEST

| Slovenia | 6 - 2 | Poland |
|---|---|---|
| 3440 11.0 | Report | 13.0 3416 |
| Nataša Radić 587 2.0 | | 2.0 568 Julia Sidło |
| Maja Plavčak 581 1.0 | | 3.0 586 Aleksandra Bonk |
| Patricija Bizjak 584 2.0 | | 2.0 563 Julia Brodziszewska |
| Maša Miklavec 554 2.0 | | 2.0 549 Agata Banaszak Kamińska ( (substituted on) 38 Anna Chwastyniak) |
| Tadeja Kokalj 557 3.0 | | 1.0 549 Barbara Gandecka |
| Marija Ahačič Premrl 577 1.0 | | 3.0 601 Nicoletta Dudziak |

ZST Hall, Tarnowo Podgórne
Head referee: Mitja Hudovernik

26 Oct 2021
18:30 CEST

| Poland | 1 - 7 | Hungary |
|---|---|---|
| 3287 7.0 | Report | 17.0 3526 |
| Julia Sidło 554 0.0 | | 4.0 648 Boglárka Hari |
| Aleksandra Bonk 566 2.0 | | 2.0 576 Gyöngyi Csongrádi |
| Barbara Gandecka 543 0.0 | | 4.0 620 Anita Méhész |
| Dominika Zygarłowska 542 2.0 | | 2.0 534 Beatrix Nagy |
| Nicoletta Dudziak 558 1.0 | | 3.0 600 Edit Sass ( (substituted on) 61 Krisztina Petene Bruszt) |
| Weronika Paszyk 524 2.0 | | 2.0 548 Katalin Tóth ( (substituted on) 91 Andrea Tóth) |

ZST Hall, Tarnowo Podgórne
Head referee: Mitja Hudovernik

27 Oct 2021
15:00 CEST

| Hungary | 5 - 3 | Slovenia |
|---|---|---|
| 3625 16.0 | Report | 8.0 3475 |
| Gyöngyi Csongrádi 613 2.0 | | 2.0 621 Nataša Radić |
| Boglárka Hari 604 3.0 | | 1.0 566 Maja Plavčak |
| Anita Méhész 622 2.0 | | 2.0 626 Marija Ahačič Premrl |
| ( (substituted on) 31 Andrea Tóth) Beatrix Nagy 547 2.0 | | 2.0 554 Patricija Bizjak |
| ( (substituted on) 91 Krisztina Petene Bruszt) Edit Sass 636 4.0 | | 0.0 540 Tadeja Kokalj ( (substituted on) 61 Tea Repnik) |
| Katalin Tóth 603 3.0 | | 1.0 568 Tina Mrzljak |

ZST Hall, Tarnowo Podgórne
Head referee: Mitja Hudovernik

== Final Round ==
=== Bracket ===
Quarterfinals
1A | Croatia | 8
2C | Austria | 0
1B | Germany | 7
2D | Slovenia | 1
1C | Czech Republic | 8
2A | Romania | 0
1D | Hungary | 2
2B | Serbia | 6

Semifinals
Croatia | 3
Germany | 5
Czech Republic | 6
Serbia | 2

Final
Germany | 7
Czech Republic | 1
Third place
Croatia | 5
Serbia | 3

=== Quarterfinals ===
28 Oct 2021
08:00 CEST

| Croatia | 8 - 0 | Austria |
|---|---|---|
| 3775 21.0 | Report | 3.0 3488 |
| Klara Sedlar 625 4.0 | | 0.0 564 Karin Niederwimmer |
| Ana Bacan-Schneider 625 3.0 | | 1.0 606 Fiona Steiner |
| ( (substituted on) 61 Valentina Gal) Amela Nicol Imširović 606 3.0 | | 1.0 595 Vanessa Laibacher |
| Ines Maričić 663 4.0 | | 0.0 586 Nathalie Neubauer |
| Mirna Bosak 634 4.0 | | 0.0 548 Sarah Walch |
| Milana Pavlić 622 3.0 | | 1.0 589 Monika Lengauer |

ZST Hall, Tarnowo Podgórne
Head referee: Mitja Hudovernik

28 Oct 2021
11:30 CEST

| Germany | 7 - 1 | Slovenia |
|---|---|---|
| 3675 17.0 | Report | 7.0 3533 |
| Celine Zenker 616 2.0 | | 2.0 636 Maja Plavčak |
| Sina Beißer 634 4.0 | | 0.0 564 Maša Miklavec |
| Sandra Sellner 583 3.5 | | 0.5 576 Patricija Bizjak |
| Anna Müller 653 3.0 | | 1.0 570 Nataša Radić |
| Alena Bimber 600 2.5 | | 1.5 601 Tina Mrzljak |
| ( (substituted on) 91 Jana-Sophie Bachert) Saskia Seitz 589 2.0 | | 2.0 586 Marija Ahačič Premrl |

ZST Hall, Tarnowo Podgórne
Head referee: Mitja Hudovernik

28 Oct 2021
15:00 CEST

| Czech Republic | 8 - 0 | Romania |
|---|---|---|
| 3719 18.0 | Report | 6.0 3528 |
| Nikola Tatoušková 641 3.0 | | 1.0 620 Alina Ştefania Sanda |
| Dana Martinkevič 630 4.0 | | 0.0 559 Georgiana Alice Vasile |
| Natálie Topičová 583 2.0 | | 2.0 558 Noemi Budoi |
| Vlasta Kohoutová 588 3.0 | | 1.0 550 Daniela Lăcătuşu |
| Hana Wiedermannová 656 3.0 | | 1.0 654 Luminiţa Viorica Dogaru |
| Jana Braunová 621 3.0 | | 1.0 587 Réka Fekete |

ZST Hall, Tarnowo Podgórne
Head referee: Mitja Hudovernik

28 Oct 2021
18:30 CEST

| Hungary | 2 - 6 | Serbia |
|---|---|---|
| 3585 9.0 | Report | 15.0 3632 |
| Anita Méhész 636 3.0 | | 1.0 628 Kristina Ljubenković |
| ( (substituted on) 61 Beatrix Nagy) Gyöngyi Csongrádi 535 0.0 | | 4.0 598 Višnja Živanović |
| Krisztina Petene Bruszt 636 3.0 | | 1.0 598 Ljiljana Frenc |
| Katalin Tóth 582 1.0 | | 3.0 581 Vladana Obrenić |
| Boglárka Hari 595 1.0 | | 3.0 615 Jasmina Anđelković |
| Edit Sass 601 1.0 | | 3.0 612 Dijana Kormanjoš |

ZST Hall, Tarnowo Podgórne
Head referee: Mitja Hudovernik

=== Semifinals ===
29 Oct 2021
12:00 CEST

| Croatia | 3 - 5 | Germany |
|---|---|---|
| 3648 9.0 | Report | 15.0 3733 |
| ( (substituted on) 91 Klara Seldar) Marijana Liović 568 0.0 | | 4.0 656 Sina Beißer |
| Valentina Gal 616 1.0 | | 3.0 622 Anna Müller |
| Amela Nicol Imširović 621 2.0 | | 2.0 615 Celine Zenker |
| ( (substituted on) 91 Milana Pavlić) Mirna Bosak 577 0.0 | | 4.0 653 Saskia Seitz |
| Nataša Ravnić 623 3.0 | | 1.0 569 Alena Bimber |
| Ines Maričić 643 3.0 | | 1.0 618 Sandra Sellner |

ZST Hall, Tarnowo Podgórne
Head referee: Mitja Hudovernik

29 Oct 2021
16:00 CEST

| Czech Republic | 6 - 2 | Serbia |
|---|---|---|
| 3663 13.5 | Report | 10.5 3612 |
| Nikola Tatoušková 632 2.5 | | 1.5 644 Jasmina Anđelković |
| Dana Martinkevič 615 3.0 | | 1.0 587 Višnja Živanović |
| Natálie Topičová 634 3.0 | | 1.0 607 Kristina Ljubenković |
| Helena Gruszková 585 1.0 | | 3.0 608 Ljiljana Frenc |
| Hana Wiedermannová 610 1.0 | | 3.0 600 Dijana Kormanjoš |
| Jana Braunová 587 3.0 | | 1.0 566 Vladana Obrenić ( (substituted on) 116 Kristina Trošić) |

ZST Hall, Tarnowo Podgórne
Head referee: Mitja Hudovernik

=== Third place game ===
30 Oct 2021
10:00 CEST

| Croatia | 5 - 3 | Serbia |
|---|---|---|
| 3670 13.5 | Report | 10.5 3602 |
| Valentina Gal 608 1.0 | | 3.0 624 Kristina Ljubenković |
| Amela Nicol Imširović 624 3.0 | | 1.0 607 Višnja Živanović |
| Klara Sedlar 612 1.0 | | 3.0 609 Ljiljana Frenc |
| Milana Pavlić 592 2.0 | | 2.0 596 Vladana Obrenić |
| Nataša Ravnić 612 2.5 | | 1.5 598 Jasmina Anđelković |
| Ines Maričić 622 4.0 | | 0.0 568 Dijana Kormanjoš |

ZST Hall, Tarnowo Podgórne
Head referee: Mitja Hudovernik

=== Final ===
30 Oct 2021
14:00 CEST

| Germany | 7 - 1 | Czech Republic |
|---|---|---|
| 3823 19.0 | Report | 5.0 3628 |
| Sina Beißer 650 3.0 | | 1.0 627 Natalia Tatoušková |
| Celine Zenker 624 4.0 | | 0.0 563 Helena Gruszková ( (substituted on) 61 Vlasta Kohoutová) |
| Anna Müller 639 4.0 | | 0.0 591 Dana Martinkevič |
| Sandra Sellner 624 3.0 | | 1.0 605 Natalie Topičová |
| Alena Bimber 628 2.0 | | 2.0 630 Hana Wiedermannová |
| Saskia Seitz 658 3.0 | | 1.0 612 Jana Braunová |

ZST Hall, Tarnowo Podgórne
Head referee: Mitja Hudovernik

== Final standing ==
| Rank | Team |
|---|---|
| 1st place, gold medalist(s) | Germany |
| 2nd place, silver medalist(s) | Czech Republic |
| 3rd place, bronze medalist(s) | Croatia |
| 4 | Serbia |
| 5-8 | Austria |
| 5-8 | Hungary |
| 5-8 | Romania |
| 5-8 | Slovenia |
| 9-12 | Bosnia and Herzegovina |
| 9-12 | France |
| 9-12 | Poland |
| 9-12 | Slovakia |
| 13 | Estonia |

2021 Women's World Champions

Germany
3rd title

Team roster: Jana-Sophie Bachert, Sina Beißer, Alena Bimber, Anna Müller, Yvonne Schneider, Saskia Seitz, Sandra Sellner, Celine Zenker
Head coach: Sandra Hirsch
