= 2019 World Team Ninepin Bowling Classic Championships =

European bowling competition

8th World Team Ninepin Bowling Classic Championships
- Host city: Rokycany
- Country: Czech Republic
- Events: 2
- Opening: May 16, 2019
- Closing: May 26, 2019

Location in Europe
Location in the Czech Republic

The 2019 World Team Ninepin Bowling Classic Championships was the eighth edition of the team championships and held in Rokycany, Czech Republic, from 16 May to 26 May 2019.

In men's tournament Serbia has secured gold medal, while in women's tournament world champion title was captured by Croatia.

== Schedule ==
Two competitions will be held.

All time are local (UTC+2).

Date	Time	Round
16 May 2019	10:00	Men group B games
17 July 2019	10:00	Men group B games
17 July 2019	19:00	Opening ceremony
18 May 2019	08:00	Group stage
19 May 2019	08:00	Group stage
20 May 2019	08:00	Group stage
21 May 2019	08:00	Group stage
22 May 2019	08:00	Group stage
23 May 2019	08:00	Group stage
24 May 2019	08:00	Quarterfinals
25 May 2019	10:00	Semifinals
26 May 2019	08:00	Third place games
26 May 2019	11:30	Women Final
26 May 2019	15:00	Men Final
26 May 2019	18:30	Medal and closing ceremony

== Participating teams ==
=== Men ===
- Austria
- Bosnia and Herzegovina
- Croatia
- Czech Republic
- Denmark
- Estonia
- France
- Germany
- Hungary
- Italy
- North Macedonia
- Poland
- Romania
- Serbia
- Slovakia
- Slovenia
- Sweden

=== Women ===
- Austria
- Bosnia and Herzegovina
- Croatia
- Czech Republic
- Denmark
- Estonia
- France
- Germany
- Hungary
- Italy
- Poland
- Romania
- Serbia
- Slovakia
- Slovenia

== Medal summary ==
Event	Gold	Silver	Bronze
Men	Serbia; Čongor Baranj; Robert Ernješi; Uroš Jagličić; Milan Jovetić; Igor Kovačić; Aleksandar Milinković; Miloš Simijonović; Daniel Tepša; Radovan Vlajkov; Vilmoš Zavarko	Germany; Mathias Dirnberger; Timo Hoffmann; Dominik Kunze; Jürgen Pointinger; Thomas Schneider; Mathias Weber; Manuel Weiß; Christian Wilke	Hungary; János Brancsek; Levente Kakuk; László Karsai; Norbert Kiss; Tamas Kiss; Gábor Kovács; Zoltan Móricz; Zsombor Zapletán
Women	Croatia; Ana Bacan-Schneider; Mirna Bosak; Ana Jambrović; Marijana Liović; Ines Maričić; Milana Pavlić; Nataša Ravnić; Klara Sedlar	Hungary; Gyöngyi Csongradi; Boglarka Hári; Anita Méhész; Anita Sáfrány; Edit Sass; Petra Simon; Andrea Tóth; Katalin Tóth	Germany; Alina Dollheimer; Kathrin Lutz; Anna Müller; Simone Schneider; Saskia Seitz; Sandra Sellner; Celine Zenker

=== Medal table ===
Rank	Nation	Gold	Silver	Bronze	Total
1	Croatia (CRO)	1	0	0	1
1	Serbia (SRB)	1	0	0	1
3	Germany (GER)	0	1	1	2
3	Hungary (HUN)	0	1	1	2
Totals (4 entries)		2	2	2	6
