= 2019 World Team Ninepin Bowling Classic Championships – Women's tournament =

Tournament details
- Host country: Czech Republic
- City: Rokycany
- Venue: 1 (in 1 host city)
- Dates: 18–26 May
- Teams: 15

Final positions
- Champions: Croatia (2nd title)
- Runners-up: Hungary
- Third place: Germany
- Fourth place: Czech Republic

Tournament statistics
- Matches played: 29
- Top scorer: (Croatia) Ines Maričić 687

The women's tournament at the 2019 World Team Ninepin Bowling Classic Championships were held in Rokycany, Czech Republic, from 18 to 26 May 2019.

Croatia captured their second title by defeating Hungary 5–3 in the final match. Bronze was secured by Germany who beat host Czechia 7–1.

== Participating teams ==
- Austria
- Bosnia and Herzegovina
- Croatia
- Czech Republic
- Denmark
- Estonia
- France
- Germany
- Hungary
- Italy
- Poland
- Romania
- Serbia
- Slovakia
- Slovenia

=== Draw ===
Pot 1	Pot 2	Pot 3	Pot 4
Croatia; Czech Republic (hosts); Germany; Slovenia	Hungary; Italy; Serbia; Slovakia	Austria; Bosnia and Herzegovina; France; Romania	Denmark; Estonia; Poland

=== Groups ===
Group A	Group B	Group C	Group D
Croatia; Slovakia; Romania; Denmark	Germany; Italy; Austria; Poland	Czech Republic (hosts); Serbia; Bosnia and Herzegovina; Estonia	Slovenia; Hungary; France

== Group stage ==
=== Group A ===
		Pts	Matches			Team points		Set points		Qualification
Rank	Team	Pts	W	D	L	W	L	W	L	Qualification
1	Croatia	6	3	0	0	22	2	55	17	Advance to quarterfinals
2	Romania	4	2	0	1	14	10	36.5	35.5	Advance to quarterfinals
3	Slovakia	2	1	0	2	11	13	37.5	34.5	
4	Denmark	0	0	0	3	1	23	15	57	

18 May 2019
15:00 CEST

Slovakia	2 - 6	Romania
3383 9.0	Report	15.0 3500
Katarína Valigurová 573 4.0		0.0 533 Maria Ciobanu
Dana Klubertová 565 1.0		3.0 620 Daniela Lacatusu
( (substituted on) 61 Monika Magalová) Gabriela Kuchárová 522 1.0		3.0 564 Tilda Duka
Mária Tomková 555 0.0		4.0 593 Florentina Naghi
Lenka Stasinková 572 0.0		4.0 614 Luminita Viorica Dogaru
Klaudia Pivková 596 3.0		1.0 576 Andrea Mioara Baicoianu

Zimní Stadion, Rokycany

18 May 2019
18:30 CEST

Croatia	8 - 0	Denmark
3671 23.0	Report	1.0 2975
Ana Bacan - Schneider 579 3.0		1.0 525 Bente Wiinberg
Ana Jambrović 618 4.0		0.0 493 Linda Holst Bille
Mirna Bosak 612 4.0		0.0 468 Helene Holst Jensen
( (substituted on) 61 Tihana Čavlović) Nataša Ravnić 601 4.0		0.0 447 Marita Geinitz
( (substituted on) 61 Klara Sedlar) Milana Pavlić 622 4.0		0.0 629 Anni Johnna Malm
Ines Maričić 639 4.0		0.0 513 Ena Emma Bargholz

Zimní Stadion, Rokycany

20 May 2019
08:00 CEST

Romania	1 - 7	Croatia
3465 7.5	Report	16.5 3628
Andrea Mioara Baicoianu 501 1.0		3.0 583 Mirna Bosak
Daniela Lacatusu 605 0.0		4.0 636 Klara Sedlar
Florentina Naghi 588 1.0		3.0 607 Ana Jambrović
Maria Ciobanu 570 2.0		2.0 576 Milana Pavlić ( (substituted on) 91 Ana Bacan - Schneider)
Luminita Viorica Dogaru 618 2.5		1.5 616 Nataša Ravnić
Reka Fekete 583 1.0		3.0 610 Ines Maričić ( (substituted on) 91 Tihana Čavlović)

Zimní Stadion, Rokycany

21 May 2019
18:30 CEST

Denmark	0 - 8	Slovakia
3051 4.0	Report	20.0 3386
( (substituted on) 91 Ulla Jensen) Helene Holst Jensen 491 1.0		3.0 532 Monika Magalová
Bente Wiinberg 496 1.0		3.0 547 Patrícia Machálková
Marita Geinitz 467 0.0		4.0 571 Mária Tomková
Linda Holst Bille 545 0.0		4.0 607 Dana Klubertová
Anni Johnna Malm 526 1.0		3.0 572 Lenka Stasinkova
Ena Emma Bargholz 526 1.0		3.0 557 Klaudia Pivková

Zimní Stadion, Rokycany

22 May 2019
15:00 CEST

Romania	7 - 1	Denmark
3276 14.0	Report	10.0 3192
Daniela Lacatusu 563 2.0		2.0 540 Anni Johnna Malm
Maria Ciobanu 544 2.5		1.5 570 Ena Emma Bargholz
Andrea Mioara Baicoianu 569 3.0		1.0 522 Ulla Jensen
Florentina Naghi 542 2.5		1.5 499 Marita Geinitz
Reka Fekete 508 2.0		2.0 529 Linda Holst Bille
Luminita Viorica Dogaru 550 2.0		2.0 532 Bente Wiinberg

Zimní Stadion, Rokycany

22 May 2019
18:30 CEST

Croatia	7 - 1	Slovakia
3629 15.5	Report	8.5 3498
Marijana Liović 618 3.0		1.0 579 Katarína Valigurová
Ana Bacan - Schneider 626 3.0		1.0 590 Patricia Michalková
( (substituted on) 61 Valentina Gal) Tihana Čavlović 573 3.0		1.0 541 Mária Tomková ( (substituted on) 61 Gabriela Kuchárová)
( (substituted on) 61 Milana Pavlić) Mirna Bosak 604 3.0		1.0 597 Dana Klubertová
Klara Sedlar 619 2.5		1.5 584 Lenka Stasinková
Ines Maričić 589 1.0		3.0 607 Klaudia Pivkova

Zimní Stadion, Rokycany

=== Group B ===
		Pts	Matches			Team points		Set points		Qualification
Rank	Team	Pts	W	D	L	W	L	W	L	Qualification
1	Germany	6	3	0	0	21	3	51.5	20.5	Advance to quarterfinals
2	Austria	4	2	0	1	14	10	40.5	31.5	Advance to quarterfinals
3	Italy	2	1	0	2	9	15	28.5	43.5	
4	Poland	0	0	0	3	4	20	23.5	48.5	

18 May 2019
15:00 CEST

Italy	2 - 6	Austria
3395 7.0	Report	17.0 3573
( (substituted on) 30 Dagmar Wiedenhofer) Christine Innferhofer 565 1.0		3.0 623 Fiona Steiner
Enikö Tot 600 3.0		1.0 575 Lisa Vsetecka
Laura Runggatscher 583 3.0		1.0 574 Dominique Pumpler
Jasmin Ladurner 533 0.0		4.0 600 Gabriele Bürger
( (substituted on) 61 Annemarie Innerhofer) Nadia Nußbaumer 546 0.0		4.0 576 Monika Lengauer
Nathalie Profanter 568 0.0		4.0 625 Nicole Plamenig

Zimní Stadion, Rokycany

18 May 2019
18:30 CEST

Germany	8 - 0	Poland
3595 17.0	Report	7.0 3413
Simone Schneider 604 3.0		1.0 559 Justyna Szymańska
Celina Zenker 603 3.0		1.0 560 Natalia Postrożny
Alina Dollheimer 595 2.0		2.0 572 Julia Rzyha
Anna Müller 611 3.0		1.0 565 Anna Chwastyniak ( (substituted on) 61 Nicoletta Dudziak)
Saskia Seitz 610 3.0		1.0 593 Kinga Konopa
Kathrin Lutz 572 3.0		1.0 564 Liwia Strzelczak

Zimní Stadion, Rokycany

20 May 2019
08:00 CEST

Austria	1 - 7	Germany
3386 5.5	Report	18.5 3555
Nicole Plamenig 553 0.0		4.0 601 Celine Zenker
Gabriele Bürger 616 1.5		2.5 608 Simone Schneider
Monika Lengauer 557 0.0		4.0 606 Alina Dollheimer
Fiona Steiner 569 2.0		2.0 553 Anna Müller
( (substituted on) 95 Dominique Pumpler) Nathalie Beubauer 538 0.0		4.0 605 Saskia Seitz ( (substituted on) 61 Sandra Sellner)
( (substituted on) 41 Vanessa Laibacher) Lisa Vsetecka 553 2.0		2.0 582 Kathrin Lutz

Zimní Stadion, Rokycany

20 May 2019
11:30 CEST

Poland	3 - 5	Italy
3392 10.5	Report	13.5 3439
Nicoletta Dudziak 591 3.0		1.0 566 Christine Innerhofer
( (substituted on) 73 Justyna Szymańska) Anna Chwastyniak 519 1.0		3.0 581 Enikö Tot
Natalia Postrożny 585 2.5		1.5 578 Laura Runggatscher
Julia Rzyha 587 3.0		1.0 514 Dagmar Wiedenhofer ( (substituted on) 29 Nadia Nußbaumer)
Liwia Strzelczak 583 1.0		3.0 568 Annemarie Innerhofer
Kinga Konopa 527 0.0		4.0 632 Nathalie Profanter

Zimní Stadion, Rokycany

22 May 2019
15:00 CEST

Austria	7 - 1	Poland
3567 18.0	Report	6.0 3343
Fiona Steiner 597 3.0		1.0 553 Nicoletta Dudziak
Lisa Vsetecka 596 3.0		1.0 538 Kinga Konopa
Dominique Pumpler 559 2.0		2.0 584 Natalia Postrożny
Gabriele Bürger 596 3.0		1.0 542 Julia Rzyha
Monika Lengauer 594 3.0		1.0 562 Liwia Strzelczak
Nicole Plamenig 625 4.0		0.0 564 Anna CHwastyniak

Zimní Stadion, Rokycany

22 May 2019
18:30 CEST

Germany	6 - 2	Italy
3572 16.0	Report	8.0 3354
Kathrin Lutz 568 1.0		3.0 617 Nathalie Profanter
Celine Zenker 565 1.0		3.0 566 Enikö Tot
Yvonne Schneider 586 2.0		2.0 567 Laura Runggatscher
Saskia Seitz 636 4.0		0.0 564 Jasmin Ladurner
Sandra Sellner 605 4.0		0.0 517 Annemarie Innerhofer ( (substituted on) 61 Nadia Nußbaumer)
Alina Dollheimer 612 4.0		0.0 523 Christine Innerhofer ( (substituted on) 61 Dagmar Wiedenhofer)

Zimní Stadion, Rokycany

=== Group C ===
		Pts	Matches			Team points		Set points		Qualification
Rank	Team	Pts	W	D	L	W	L	W	L	Qualification
1	Czech Republic (H)	6	3	0	0	21	3	47.5	24.5	Advance to quarterfinals
2	Serbia	4	2	0	1	16	8	44.5	27.5	Advance to quarterfinals
3	Bosnia and Herzegovina	2	1	0	2	7	17	29.5	42.5	
4	Estonia	0	0	0	3	4	20	22.5	49.5	

18 May 2019
08:00 CEST

Serbia	7 - 1	Bosnia and Herzegovina
3527 16.5	Report	7.5 3369
Nataša Lemić 606 2.0		2.0 600 Tatjana Zlojutro
Kristina Ljubenković 601 4.0		0.0 554 Una Smajić
Hermina Lukač 614 1.5		2.5 643 Maja Kovačević
Dijana Kormanjos 532 2.0		2.0 511 Edina Kovačević ( (substituted on) 61 Bogdana Vicanović)
Zorica Barać 583 3.0		1.0 549 Rešida Rahmanović
Marijana Oros 591 4.0		0.0 512 Tatjana Perišić

Zimní Stadion, Rokycany

18 May 2019
11:30 CEST

Czech Republic	8 - 0	Estonia
3584 19.0	Report	5.0 3259
Lucie Vaverková 572 2.0		2.0 546 Kaidi Kirs
Martina Hrdinová 574 4.0		0.0 495 Kaja Peets
Natalie Topicová 598 2.0		2.0 588 Heret Ots
Helena Gruszková 598 3.0		1.0 560 Kaire Kalberg
Hana Wiedermanová 634 4.0		0.0 548 Kertu Rohumägi
Olga Hejhalová 608 4.0		0.0 522 Merie Rohumägi

Zimní Stadion, Rokycany

20 May 2019
15:00 CEST

Estonia	1 - 7	Serbia
3316 7.0	Report	17.0 3481
Kaire Kalberg 529 0.0		4.0 618 Olivera Čikoš
Heret Ots 547 2.0		2.0 564 Dijana Kormanjos
Gertrud Saetalu 569 2.0		2.0 571 Kristina Ljubenković
Kaidi Kirs 586 2.0		2.0 580 Dragana Dorožan
Triinu Saetalu 543 1.0		3.0 559 Marija Kresović
Kertu Rohumägi 542 0.0		4.0 589 Hermina Lukač

Zimní Stadion, Rokycany

20 May 2019
18:30 CEST

Bosnia and Herzegovina	1 - 7	Czech Republic
3305 8.5	Report	15.5 3546
Una Smajić 532 1.0		3.0 575 Martina Hrdinová
Tatjana Perišić 533 1.5		2.5 586 Jana Braunová
Tatjana Zlojutro 557 1.0		3.0 628 Dana Martinkević
Bogdana Vicanović 559 1.0		3.0 573 Helena Gruszková ( (substituted on) 61 Natalie Topicová)
Maja Kovačević 600 3.0		1.0 560 Alena Kantnerová
Rešida Rahmanović 524 1.0		3.0 624 Hana Wiedermanová

Zimní Stadion, Rokycany

22 May 2019
08:00 CEST

Bosnia and Herzegovina	5 - 3	Estonia
3382 13.5	Report	10.5 3339
Una Smajić 589 3.0		1.0 575 Kaire Kalberg
Tatjana Zlojutro 554 3.0		1.0 521 Katja Peets
( (substituted on) 91 Tatjana Perišić) 523 1.5		2.5 553 Gertrud Saetalu
Bogdana Vicanović 556 2.0		2.0 565 Kaidi Kirs
Maja Kovačević 602 3.0		1.0 525 Triinu Saetalu
Rešida Rahmanović 558 1.0		3.0 603 Heret Ots

Zimní Stadion, Rokycany

22 May 2019
11:30 CEST

Czech Republic	6 - 2	Serbia
3572 13.0	Report	11.0 3491
Lucie Vaverková 597 2.0		2.0 576 Kristina Ljubenković
Jana Braunová 624 2.0		2.0 616 Nataša Lemić
Natalie Topicová 555 1.0		3.0 593 Hermina Lukač
Dana Martinkević 580 3.0		1.0 554 Marija Kresović
Hana Wiedermanová 629 4.0		0.0 559 Marijana Oros
Olga Hejhalová 587 1.0		3.0 593 Zorica Barać

Zimní Stadion, Rokycany

=== Group D ===
		Pts	Matches			Team points		Set points		Qualification
Rank	Team	Pts	W	D	L	W	L	W	L	Qualification
1	Hungary	4	2	0	1	14	10	34	38	Advance to quarterfinals
2	Slovenia	2	1	0	1	8	8	21	27	Advance to quarterfinals
3	France	0	0	0	2	2	14	17	31	

18 May 2019
08:00 CEST

Hungary	7 - 1	France
3470 15.0	Report	9.0 3337
Gyöngyi Csongradi 581 3.0		1.0 563 Aurélie Remy
Boglárka Hári 589 3.0		1.0 556 Cyndie Labe
Anita Méhész 616 3.0		1.0 585 Magaly Simon
Petra Simon 580 2.0		2.0 547 Emmanuelle Mall
( (substituted on) 61 Edit Sass) Katalin Tóth 579 2.0		2.0 559 Amélie Zind
( (substituted on) 61 Anita Sáfrány) Andrea Tóth 525 2.0		2.0 527 Sabrina Solano

Zimní Stadion, Rokycany

20 May 2019
15:00 CEST

France	1 - 7	Slovenia
3340 8.0	Report	16.0 3453
Aurélie Remy 542 0.0		4.0 583 Eva Sajko
( (substituted on) 61 Sabrina Solano) Cyndie Labe 555 1.0		3.0 602 Barbara Jurančič
Magaly Simon 557 2.0		2.0 561 Anja Forštnarič
Emmanuelle Mall 526 1.0		3.0 571 Maja Plavčak
Amélie Zind 585 1.0		3.0 593 Brigitte Strelec
Mathilde Chapotot 575 3.0		1.0 543 Patricija Bizjak

Zimní Stadion, Rokycany

22 May 2019
11:30 CEST

Slovenia	1 - 7	Hungary
3475 5.0	Report	19.0 3685
Barbara Jurančič 571 0.0		4.0 629 Boglárka Hári
Eva Sajko 621 3.0		1.0 597 Gyöngy Csongradi
Tadeja Kokalj 553 0.0		4.0 603 Andrea Tóth
Anja Forštnarič 591 0.0		4.0 634 Petra Simon
Brigitte Strelec 582 2.0		2.0 602 Anita Méhész
( (substituted on) 61 Noemi Živković) Maja Plavčak 557 0.0		4.0 616 Anita Sáfrány

Zimní Stadion, Rokycany

== Final Round ==
=== Bracket ===
Quarterfinals
1A	Croatia	6
2C	Serbia	2
1B	Germany	5
2D	Slovenia	3
1C	Czech Republic	7
2A	Romania	1
1D	Hungary	6
2B	Austria	2

Semifinals
Croatia	6
Germany	2
Czech Republic	3
Hungary	5

Final
Croatia	5
Hungary	3
Third place
Germany	6
Czech Republic	2

=== Quarterfinals ===
24 May 2019
08:00 CEST

Croatia	6 - 2	Serbia
3631 15.5	Report	8.5 3478
Marijana Liović 604 3.0		1.0 535 Nataša Lemić
( (substituted on) 61 Klara Sedlar) Ana Bacan - Schneider 595 1.5		2.5 609 Kristina Ljubenković
Ana Jambrović 597 4.0		0.0 556 Olivera Čikoš
Nataša Ravnić 630 4.0		0.0 554 Dragana Dorožan
Ines Maričić 603 1.0		3.0 630 Zorica Barać
Milana Pavlić 602 2.0		2.0 594 Hermina Lukač

Zimní Stadion, Rokycany

24 May 2019
11:30 CEST

Germany	5 - 3	Slovenia
3585 15.0	Report	9.0 3498
Simone Schneider 626 3.0		1.0 602 Eva Sajko
Celine Zenker 594 1.0		3.0 608 Barbara Jurančič
Yvonne Schneider 578 2.0		2.0 592 Anja Forštnarič
Alina Dollheimer 623 4.0		0.0 528 Noemi Živković ( (substituted on) 61 Tadeja Kokalj)
Sandra Sellner 599 4.0		0.0 561 Maja Plavčak
( (substituted on) 61 Kathrin Lutz) Saskia Seitz 565 1.0		3.0 607 Brigitte Strelec

Zimní Stadion, Rokycany

24 May 2019
15:00 CEST

Czech Republic	7 - 1	Romania
3716 14.0	Report	10.0 3567
Lucie Vaverková 639 2.5		1.5 609 Daniela Lacatusu
Jana Braunová 631 2.0		2.0 611 Tilda Duka
Natalie Topicová 607 2.0		2.0 598 Andrea Mioara Baicoianu
Dana Martinkević 620 3.5		0.5 582 Florentina Naghi
( (substituted on) 61 Alena Kantnerová) Hana Wiedermanová 655 4.0		0.0 543 Maria Ciobanu
Olga Hejhalová 564 0.0		4.0 624 Luminita Viorica Dogaru

Zimní Stadion, Rokycany

24 May 2019
18:30 CEST

Hungary	6 - 2	Austria
3604 13.0	Report	11.0 3562
Boglarka Hári 645 3.0		1.0 603 Fiona Steiner
Gyöngyi Csongradi 567 1.0		3.0 614 Lisa Vsetecka
Andrea Tóth 599 3.0		1.0 559 Dominique Pumpler ( (substituted on) 91 Vanessa Laibacher)
Petra Simon 574 1.0		3.0 659 Gabriele Bürger
( (substituted on) 61 Katalin Tóth) Edit Saas 563 2.0		2.0 547 Monika Lengauer
Anita Méhész 656 3.0		1.0 580 Nicole Plamenig

Zimní Stadion, Rokycany

=== Semifinals ===
25 May 2019
10:00 CEST

Croatia	6 - 2	Germany
3720 12.0	Report	12.0 3714
Mirna Bosak 649 3.0		1.0 609 Celine Zenker
Klara Sedlar 581 1.0		3.0 599 Simone Schneider
Marijana Liović 655 3.0		1.0 661 Alina Dollheimer
Ana Jambrović 618 2.0		2.0 607 Sandra Sellner
Ines Maričić 616 2.0		2.0 608 Saskia Seitz
Nataša Ravnić 601 1.0		3.0 630 Kathrin Lutz

Zimní Stadion, Rokycany

25 May 2019
13:30 CEST

Czech Republic	3 - 5	Hungary
3555 11.0	Report	13.0 3663
Lucie Vaverková 604 0.0		4.0 644 Boglarka Hári
Jana Braunová 617 3.0		1.0 577 Gyöngyi Csongradi
Natalie Topicová 621 2.0		2.0 623 Andrea Tóth
( (substituted on) 61 Olga Hejhalová) Dana Martinkević 597 3.0		1.0 586 Petra Simon
( (substituted on) 31 Helena Gruszková) Alena Kantnerová 504 0.0		4.0 643 Anita Méhész
Hana Wiedermanová 612 3.0		1.0 590 Anita Sáfrány

Zimní Stadion, Rokycany

=== Third place game ===
26 May 2019
08:00 CEST

Germany	6 - 2	Czech Republic
3675 12.0	Report	12.0 3624
Celine Zenker 628 3.0		1.0 601 Lucie Vaverková
Simone Schneider 587 3.0		1.0 567 Martina Hrdinová
Alina Dollheimer 631 2.0		2.0 604 Jana Braunová
Sandra Sellner 610 3.0		1.0 573 Natalie Topicová
( (substituted on) 61 Anna Müller) Saskia Seitz 602 1.0		3.0 633 Hana Wiedermanová
Kathrin Lutz 615 0.0		4.0 646 Olga Hejhalová

Zimní Stadion, Rokycany

=== Final ===
26 May 2019
12:00 CEST

Croatia	5 - 3	Hungary
3759 11.0	Report	13.0 3665
Mirna Bosak 589 1.0		3.0 601 Gyöngyi Csongradi
Ana Bacan - Schneider 616 4.0		0.0 576 Andrea Tóth
Marijana Liović 640 2.0		2.0 597 Boglarka Hári
Ines Maričić 687 3.0		1.0 609 Petra Simon ( (substituted on) 91 Edit Sass)
Milana Pavlić 631 1.0		3.0 664 Anita Méhész
( (substituted on) 31 Klara Sedlar, (substituted on) 91 Nataša Ravnić) Ana Jambrović 596 0.0		4.0 618 Anita Sáfrány ( (substituted on) 91 Katalin Tóth)

Zimní Stadion, Rokycany

== Final standing ==
Rank	Team
1st place, gold medalist(s)	Croatia
2nd place, silver medalist(s)	Hungary
3rd place, bronze medalist(s)	Germany
4	Czech Republic
5-8	Austria
5-8	Romania
5-8	Serbia
5-8	Slovenia
9-12	Bosnia and Herzegovina
9-12	France
9-12	Italy
9-12	Slovakia
13-15	Denmark
13-15	Estonia
13-15	Poland
