= 2018 World Singles Ninepin Bowling Classic Championships – Women's single =

Event

Women's single at the 2018 World Singles Ninepin Bowling Classic Championships
- Location: Cluj-Napoca, Romania
- Dates: 21-22 May 2018 (Qualification); 24-26 May 2018 (Knock-out phase)
- Competitors: 64 from 17 nations

Medalists
gold medal	(Germany) Sina Beißer
silver medal	(Hungary) Anita Méhész
bronze medal	(Slovenia) Brigita Strelec
bronze medal	(Croatia) Ines Maričić

The women's single event at the 2018 World Singles Ninepin Bowling Classic Championships was held in Cluj-Napoca, Romania. Qualification took place on 21-22 May, while the knock-out phase from 24 May to 26 May 2018.

== Results ==
=== Qualification ===
32 players qualified for the knock-out phase.

Rank	Name	Country	All	Clean	Faults	Total	Notes
1	Jasmina Anđelković	Serbia	392	248	1	640	Q
2	Ines Maričić	Croatia	401	219	2	620	Q
3	Anita Méhész	Hungary	405	202	1	607	Q
4	Maria Ciobanu	Romania	376	229	1	605	Q
5	Patricia Bizjak	Slovenia	391	214	2	605	Q
6	Ana Jambrović	Serbia	402	202	0	604	Q
7	Katarína Valigurová	Czech Republic	378	225	0	603	Q
8	Milana Pavlić	Serbia	382	220	0	602	Q
9	Brigita Strelec	Slovenia	387	215	0	602	Q
10	Petra Bašek	Slovenia	392	210	2	602	Q
11	Zorica Barać	Serbia	382	219	1	601	Q
12	Dana Klubertová	Slovakia	369	231	3	600	Q
13	Kinga Konopa	Poland	387	213	0	600	Q
14	Eva Sajko	Slovenia	396	201	2	597	Q
15	Anja Forštnarič	Slovenia	395	199	0	594	Q
16	Edit Sass	Hungary	378	212	1	590	Q
17	Klaudia Pivková	Slovakia	378	212	2	590	Q
18	Daniela Kicker	Germany	378	212	3	590	Q
19	Maja Đukić	Serbia	385	202	0	585	Q
20	Sina Beißer	Germany	397	188	0	585	Q
21	Alena Kantnerová	Czech Republic	365	218	1	583	Q
22	Tihana Čavlović	Croatia	378	205	0	583	Q
23	Lucie Vaverková	Czech Republic	382	201	0	583	Q
24	Nikola Tatoušková	Czech Republic	357	224	1	581	Q
25	Mirna Bosak	Croatia	396	185	0	581	Q
26	Zuzana Musilová	Czech Republic	378	202	2	580	Q
27	Corinna Kastner	Germany	383	196	1	579	Q
28	Dagmar Wiedenhofer	Italy	398	181	4	579	Q
29	Luminita Dogaru	Romania	387	191	0	578	Q
30	Veronika Petrov	Czech Republic	371	206	5	577	Q
31	Irén Nemes	Hungary	383	194	0	577	Q
32	Anita Dallosné Takács	Hungary	361	215	1	576	Q
33	Renáta Navrkalová	Czech Republic	384	192	1	576	
34	Simone Schneider	Germany	372	202	5	574	
35	Natasa Ravnić-Gasparini	Croatia	374	200	2	574	
36	Melina Zimmermann	Germany	382	192	1	574	
37	Alina Dollheimer	Germany	357	215	0	572	
38	Nathalie Profanter	Italy	367	205	1	572	
39	Nicole Plamenig	Austria	367	204	2	571	
40	Daniela Lacatusu	Romania	358	212	2	570	
41	Enikö Tot	Italy	363	204	2	567	
42	Aurélie Remy	France	385	182	5	567	
43	Anita Sáfrány	Hungary	364	202	2	566	
44	Andrea Mioara Baicoianu	Romania	380	186	4	566	
45	Heret Ots	Estonia	388	178	1	566	
46	Laura Runggatscher	Italy	374	191	4	565	
47	Marija Kresović	Serbia	353	208	1	561	
48	Marijana Oros	Serbia	375	186	5	561	
49	Gertrud Saetalu	Estonia	376	185	7	561	
50	Maja Kovačević	Bosnia and Herzegovina	376	184	5	560	
51	Maria Tomková	Slovakia	374	184	2	558	
52	Monika Lengauer	Austria	374	184	3	558	
53	Ramona Lienbacher	Austria	376	182	2	558	
54	Tatjana Zlojutro	Bosnia and Herzegovina	358	198	1	556	
55	Dorottya Bordács	Hungary	369	184	3	553	
56	Tanja Trpkovska	Macedonia	384	167	6	551	
57	Gabriela Kuchárová	Slovakia	361	183	1	544	
58	Irena Mejač	Slovenia	370	173	1	543	
59	Triinu Setalu	Estonia	375	167	5	542	
60	Renata Vilov	Serbia	363	159	6	522	
61	Tatjana Perišić	Bosnia and Herzegovina	376	144	12	520	
62	Anni Johnna Malm	Denmark	354	146	16	500	
63	Maria Jonnsson	Sweden	338	147	7	485	
64	Ena Emma Bargholz	Denmark	345	134	7	479	

=== Finals ===
According to the results of the qualification, 32 players were put together in bouts, which took place on standard match rules - 4 sets of 30 throws. The competitor who obtains a larger number of sets wins. With an equal number of sets decides a higher total score.

Round of 32; 24 May
1	(Serbia) Jasmina Anđelković	4	670
32	(Hungary) Anita Dallosné Takács	0	615
17	(Czech Republic) Klaudia Pivková	1,5	585
16	(Hungary) Edit Sass	2,5	622
9	(Slovenia) Brigita Strelec	4	624
24	(Czech Republic) Nikola Tatoušková	0	599
25	(Croatia) Milana Pavlić	0,5	577
8	(Croatia) Mirna Bosak	3,5	665
5	(Slovenia) Patricija Bizjak	2	538
28	(Italy) Dagmar Wiedenhofer	2	544
21	(Czech Republic) Alena Kantnerová	2,5	557
12	(Slovakia) Dana Klubertová	1,5	535
13	(Poland) Kinga Konopa	1	602
20	(Germany) Sina Beißer	3	607
29	(Romania) Luminita Viorica Dogaru	3	604
4	(Romania) Maria Ciobanu	1	489
3	(Hungary) Anita Méhész	3	611
30	(Czech Republic) Veronika Petrov	1	546
19	(Serbia) Maja Ðukić	2	606
14	(Slovenia) Eva Sajko	2	604
11	(Serbia) Zorica Barać	2	572
22	(Croatia) Tihana Čavlović	2	568
27	(Germany) Corinna Kastner	2	606
6	(Croatia) Ana Jambrović	2	620
7	(Slovakia) Katarína Valigurová	2	626
26	(Czech Republic) Zuzana Musilová	2	598
23	(Czech Republic) Lucie Vaverková	3	602
10	(Slovenia) Petra Bašek	1	570
15	(Slovenia) Anja Forštnarič	3	646
18	(Germany) Daniela Kicker	1	587
31	(Hungary) Irén Nemes	1	543
2	(Croatia) Ines Maričić	3	584

Round of 16; 25 May
(Serbia) Jasmina Anđelković	3	607
(Hungary) Edit Sass	1	609
(Slovenia) Brigita Strelec	3	652
(Croatia) Mirna Bosak	1	622
(Italy) Dagmar Wiedenhofer	1	569
(Czech Republic) Alena Kantnerova	3	595
(Germany) Sina Beißer	3	606
(Romania) Luminita Viorica Dogaru	1	550
(Hungary) Anita Méhész	3	647
(Serbia) Maja Ðukić	1	573
(Serbia) Zorica Barać	1	559
(Croatia) Ana Jambrović	3	677
(Slovakia) Katarína Valigurová	1	576
(Czech Republic) Lucie Vaverková	3	604
(Slovenia) Anja Forštnarič	0	574
(Croatia) Ines Maričić	4	660

Quarterfinals; 25 May
(Serbia) Jasmina Anđelković	2	580
(Slovenia) Brigita Strelec	2	589
(Czech Republic) Alena Kantnerová	1	603
(Germany) Sina Beißer	3	610
(Hungary) Anita Méhész	2	647
(Croatia) Ana Jambrović	2	625
(Czech Republic) Lucie Vaverková	1	633
(Croatia) Ines Maričić	3	631

Semifinals; 26 May
(Slovenia) Brigita Strelec	2	610
(Germany) Sina Beißer	2	612
(Hungary) Anita Méhész	2	647
(Croatia) Ines Maričić	2	645

Final; 26 May
(Germany) Sina Beißer	3	617
(Hungary) Anita Méhész	1	594
