= World Singles Ninepin Bowling Classic Championships =

Nine-pin bowling competition

- Status: active
- Genre: sporting event
- Dates: Until 2012 – October; Since 2014 – May
- Frequency: biennial (even years)
- Location: various
- Country: varying
- Inaugurated: 2006
- Most recent: 2024
- Next event: 2026
- Organiser: WNBA NBC
- Website: www.wnba-nbc.de

The World Singles Ninepin Bowling Classic Championships is a biennial nine-pin bowling competition organized by the World Ninepin Bowling Association (WNBA NBC). The World Championships was started in 2006, after dividing the championships into Team and Singles.

During the first championships in Skopje, the pairs event took place for the last time in history. Since 2008, the Single's Championships have in the program sprints and mixed tandems events, after removing them from the Team Championships (successively in 2005 and 2007).

== List of championships ==
| Edition | Year | City | Country | Date | Events | Top of the medal table | Notes |
|---|---|---|---|---|---|---|---|
| 1st | 2006 | Skopje | Macedonia | 23 – 28 Oct | 6 | Slovenia | Only with doubles |
| 2nd | 2008 | Banja Luka | Bosnia and Herzegovina | 21 – 25 Oct | 7 | Serbia | First with sprint and mixed tandem |
| 3rd | 2010 | Ritzing | Austria | 24 – 30 Oct | 7 | Serbia | |
| 4th | 2012 | Leszno | Poland | 21 – 27 Oct | 7 | Croatia | |
| 5th | 2014 | Brno | Czech Republic | 18 – 24 May | 7 | Hungary | |
| 6th | 2016 | Novigrad | Croatia | 22 – 28 May | 7 | Serbia | |
| 7th | 2018 | Cluj-Napoca | Romania | 20 – 26 May | 7 | Serbia | |
| – | ~~2020~~ | ~~Tarnowo Podgórne~~ | ~~Poland (2)~~ | ~~17 – 23 May~~ | – | – | Cancelled due to the COVID-19 pandemic |
| 8th | 2022 | Elva | Estonia | 22 – 28 May | 7 | Serbia | |
| 9th | 2024 | Brezno | Slovakia | 27 May – 1 Jun | 7 | Germany | |
| 10th | 2026 | Schwaz | Austria (2) | 31 May – 6 June | 11 | | New events added including women and men pairs, women and men tandems |
| 11th | 2028 | Sibiu | Romania (2) | 21 – 28 May | TBA | | |

== Medal count ==
| Rank | Nation | Gold | Silver | Bronze | Total |
|---|---|---|---|---|---|
| 1 | Serbia | 14 | 10 | 15 | 39 |
| 2 | Croatia | 9 | 5 | 12 | 26 |
| 3 | Hungary | 8 | 14 | 7 | 29 |
| 4 | Germany | 6 | 8 | 14 | 28 |
| 5 | Romania | 4 | 6 | 7 | 17 |
| 6 | Czech Republic | 4 | 4 | 4 | 12 |
| 7 | Slovenia | 4 | 3 | 9 | 16 |
| 8 | Austria | 2 | 2 | 5 | 9 |
| 9 | Slovakia | 2 | 1 | 5 | 8 |
| 10 | Estonia | 1 | 0 | 0 | 1 |
| 10 | Poland | 1 | 0 | 0 | 1 |
| 12 | France | 0 | 1 | 2 | 3 |
| 12 | North Macedonia | 0 | 1 | 2 | 3 |
| 14 | Italy | 0 | 0 | 4 | 4 |
| 15 | Bosnia and Herzegovina | 0 | 0 | 1 | 1 |
| 15 | Sweden | 0 | 0 | 1 | 1 |
| Totals (16 entries) | | 55 | 55 | 88 | 198 |

== List of hosts ==
List of hosts by number of championships hosted.

| Times hosted | Host | Year(s) |
|---|---|---|
| 2 | Austria | 2010, 2026 |
| 2 | Romania | 2018, (2028) |
| 1 | Bosnia and Herzegovina | 2008 |
| 1 | Croatia | 2016 |
| 1 | Czech Republic | 2014 |
| 1 | Estonia | 2022 |
| 1 | North Macedonia | 2006 |
| 1 | Poland | 2012, ~~2020~~ |
| 1 | Slovakia | 2024 |
