= Tarnowo Podgórne =

- Village
- Location within Poland
- Coordinates: 52°28′N 16°40′E
- Country: Poland
- Voivodeship: Greater Poland
- County: Poznań
- Gmina: Tarnowo Podgórne
- Population: 4,397
- Website: http://www.tarnowo-podgorne.pl

Tarnowo Podgórne [tarˈnɔvɔ pɔdˈɡurnɛ] is an urbanized village in Poznań County, Greater Poland Voivodeship, in west-central Poland. It is the seat of the gmina (administrative district) called Gmina Tarnowo Podgórne.

Tarnowo Podgórne was the host of the 2021 World Team Ninepin Bowling Classic Championships.
