= 2016 World Singles Ninepin Bowling Classic Championships =

European bowling competition

6th World Singles Ninepin Bowling Classic Championships
- Host city: Novigrad
- Country: Croatia
- Nations: 17
- Athletes: 130
- Events: 7
- Opening: May 22, 2016
- Closing: May 28, 2016

Location in Europe
Location in Croatia

The 2016 World Singles Ninepin Bowling Classic Championships was the sixth edition of the world singles championships and was held in Novigrad, Croatia, from 22 May to 28 May 2018.

In the men's sprint and single triumphed Vilmoš Zavarko (Serbia), while gold medal in the combined was won by Serbian Igor Kovačić. In the women's sprint triumphed Beata Włodarczyk (Poland), while in the single and combined Croatian Ines Maričić, who set a new world records in both competitions: 675 pins in single and 876 pins in combined. Mixed tandem rivalry was won by Romanians Luminita Viorica Dogaru and Nicolae Lupu.

== Participants ==
Below is the list of countries who participated in the championships and the requested number of athlete places for each.

- Austria (9)
- Bosnia and Herzegovina (5)
- Croatia (10)
- Czech Republic (10)
- Denmark (4)
- Estonia (4)
- France (6)
- Germany (12)
- Hungary (12)
- Italy (8)
- Montenegro (4)
- Poland (6)
- Romania (8)
- Serbia (11)
- Slovakia (7)
- Slovenia (11)
- Sweden (3)

== Schedule ==
Seven events were held.

All times are local (UTC+2).

Date	Time	Event
21 May 2018	09:00	Single qualifications
22 May 2018	08:30	Single qualifications
22 May 2018	18:00	Mixed tandem 1. round
23 May 2018	09:00	Sprints 1. round
23 May 2018	12:20	Mixed tandem finals
23 May 2018	15:45	Sprints finals
24 May 2018	09:00	Single finals
25 May 2018	10:00	Single finals
26 May 2018	10:00	Single finals

== Medal summary ==
=== Medal table ===
* Host nation (Host nation)

Rank	Nation	Gold	Silver	Bronze	Total
1	Serbia (SRB)	3	1	2	6
2	Croatia (CRO)*	2	0	3	5
3	Poland (POL)	1	0	0	1
3	Romania (ROM)	1	0	0	1
5	Hungary (HUN)	0	3	0	3
6	France (FRA)	0	1	1	2
6	Germany (GER)	0	1	1	2
6	Slovenia (SLO)	0	1	1	2
9	Czech Republic (CZE)	0	0	2	2
10	Austria (AUT)	0	0	1	1
10	Bosnia and Herzegovina (BIH)	0	0	1	1
Totals (11 entries)		7	7	12	26

=== Men ===
Event	Gold	Silver	Bronze
Single	Vilmoš Zavarko (SRB)	Norbert Kiss (HUN)	Igor Kovačić (SRB) Hrvoje Marinović (CRO)
Sprint	Vilmoš Zavarko (SRB)	Frédéric Koell (FRA)	Pavel Jiroušek (CZE) Igor Kovačić (SRB)
Combined	Igor Kovačić (SRB)	Vilmoš Zavarko (SRB)	Hrvoje Marinović (CRO)

=== Women ===
Event	Gold	Silver	Bronze
Single	Ines Maričić (CRO)	Sina Beißer (GER)	Aneta Cvejnová (CZE) Nataša Ravnić-Gašparini (CRO)
Sprint	Beata Włodarczyk (POL)	Brigita Strelec (SLO)	Gwennaelle Adler (FRA) Tatjana Zlojutro (BIH)
Combined	Ines Maričić (CRO)	Edina Timár (HUN)	Brigita Strelec (SLO)

=== Mixed ===
Event	Gold	Silver	Bronze
Mixed tandem	Luminita Viorica Dogaru; Nicolae Lupu; Romania	Anita Sáfrány; László Karsai; Hungary	Lisa Vsetecka; Philipp Vsetecka; Austria Simone Schneider; Fabian Seitz; Germany
