= 2018 World Singles Ninepin Bowling Classic Championships =

European bowling competition

7th World Singles Ninepin Bowling Classic Championships
- Host city: Cluj-Napoca
- Country: Romania
- Nations: 17
- Athletes: 136
- Events: 7
- Opening: May 20, 2018
- Closing: May 26, 2018

Location in Europe
Location in Romania

The 2018 World Singles Ninepin Bowling Classic Championships was the seventh edition of the world singles championships and was held in Cluj-Napoca, Romania, from 20 May to 26 May 2018 .

All the men's competitions was dominated by Vilmoš Zavarko, who won gold medals in every event. In the women's sprint triumphed Ines Maričić (Croatia), in the single German Sina Beißer, while gold medal in the combined was won by Serbian Jasmina Anđelković, who set a new world record 890 pins. Mixed tandem rivalry was won by Czechs Renáta Navrkalová and Jan Endršt.

== Participants ==
Below is the list of countries who participated in the championships and the requested number of athlete places for each.

- Austria (8)
- Bosnia and Herzegovina (6)
- Croatia (13)
- Czech Republic (12)
- Denmark (5)
- Estonia (5)
- France (3)
- Germany (12)
- Hungary (12)
- Italy (7)
- Macedonia (4)
- Poland (6)
- Romania (9)
- Serbia (12)
- Slovakia (10)
- Slovenia (10)
- Sweden (2)

== Schedule ==
Seven events were held.

All times are local (UTC+3).

Date	Time	Event
21 May 2018	09:00	Single qualifications
22 May 2018	08:30	Single qualifications
22 May 2018	18:00	Mixed tandem 1. round
23 May 2018	09:00	Sprints 1. round
23 May 2018	12:20	Mixed tandem finals
23 May 2018	15:45	Sprints finals
24 May 2018	09:00	Single finals
25 May 2018	10:00	Single finals
26 May 2018	10:00	Single finals

== Medal summary ==
=== Medal table ===
* Host nation (Host nation)

Rank	Nation	Gold	Silver	Bronze	Total
1	Serbia (SRB)	4	0	1	5
2	Croatia (CRO)	1	3	3	7
3	Germany (GER)	1	3	0	4
4	Czech Republic (CZE)	1	0	1	2
5	Hungary (HUN)	0	1	1	2
6	Romania (ROU)*	0	0	2	2
7	Austria (AUT)	0	0	1	1
7	Italy (ITA)	0	0	1	1
7	Slovenia (SLO)	0	0	1	1
7	Sweden (SWE)	0	0	1	1
Totals (10 entries)		7	7	12	26

=== Men ===
Event	Gold	Silver	Bronze
Single	Vilmoš Zavarko (SRB)	Manuel Weiß (GER)	Jan Bína (CZE) Igor Kovačić (SRB)
Sprint	Vilmoš Zavarko (SRB)	Axel Schondelmaier (GER)	Wolfgang Blaas (ITA) Nicolae Lupu (ROU)
Combined	Vilmoš Zavarko (SRB)	Timo Hoffmann (GER)	Hrvoje Marinović (CRO)

=== Women ===
Event	Gold	Silver	Bronze
Single	Sina Beißer (GER)	Anita Méhész (HUN)	Brigita Strelec (SLO) Ines Maričić (CRO)
Sprint	Ines Maričić (CRO)	Mirna Bosak (CRO)	Anita Méhész (HUN) Jenny Smevold (SWE)
Combined	Jasmina Anđelković (SRB)	Ines Maričić (CRO)	Mirna Bosak (CRO)

=== Mixed ===
Event	Gold	Silver	Bronze
Mixed tandem	Renáta Navrkalová; Jan Endršt; Czech Republic	Ana Jambrović; Hrvoje Marinović; Croatia	Ramona Lienbacher; Philipp Vsetecka; Austria Tilda Duka; Petruţ Ovidiu Mihălcioiu; Romania
