= Ines Maričić =

Croatian nine-pin bowling player

Personal information
- Nationality: Croatian
- Born: May 22, 1988 (age 38) Zagreb, Croatia

Sport
- Country: Croatia
- Sport: 9-pins
- Club: (Croatia) KK Zagreb (1998-2014) (Croatia) KK Mlaka (2014-2016) (Germany) SKC Victoria 1947 Bamberg (2016-2022) (Croatia) KK Mlaka (2022-2023) (Croatia) KgK Frozy Zabok (2023- )

Achievements and titles
- Personal best: 120: 687 (Rokycany 2019)
Medal record
Women's 9-pins
Representing Croatia
| Event | 1st | 2nd | 3rd |
|---|---|---|---|
| World Championships | 5 | 3 | 5 |
| U23 World Championships | 0 | 0 | 1 |
| U23 World Cup | 0 | 0 | 1 |
| Total | 5 | 3 | 7 |
| Event | 1st | 2nd | 3rd |
|---|---|---|---|
| Single | 1 | 0 | 3 |
| Sprint | 1 | 0 | 1 |
| Combination | 1 | 2 | 0 |
| Team | 2 | 1 | 3 |
World Championships
| Gold medal – first place | 2015 Speichersdorf | Team |
| Gold medal – first place | 2016 Novigrad | Single |
| Gold medal – first place | 2016 Novigrad | Combination |
| Gold medal – first place | 2018 Cluj | Sprint |
| Gold medal – first place | 2019 Rokycany | Team |
| Silver medal – second place | 2010 Ritzing | Combination |
| Silver medal – second place | 2017 Dettenheim | Team |
| Silver medal – second place | 2018 Cluj | Combination |
| Bronze medal – third place | 2010 Ritzing | Single |
| Bronze medal – third place | 2013 Zalaegerszeg | Team |
| Bronze medal – third place | 2014 Brno | Sprint |
| Bronze medal – third place | 2018 Cluj | Single |
| Bronze medal – third place | 2021 Tarnowo Podgórne | Team |
U23 World Championships
| Bronze medal – third place | 2010 Rijeka | Team |
U23 World Cup
| Bronze medal – third place | 2011 Tallinn | Single |

Ines Maričić (born 22 May 1988 in Zagreb) is a Croatian 9 pin bowling player who plays for KgK Frozy Zabok and Croatia national team.
