= International Cup =

International Cup may refer to one the following sporting events:

== Auto racing competitions ==
- International Cup for Formula One Manufacturers, a former name of the World Constructors' Championship
- International Cup for GT Cars, a former part of the World Sportscar Championship
- Oulton Park International Gold Cup, a motor race held annually in Cheshire, England

== Football (soccer) competitions ==
- Alkass International Cup, an annual U17 football tournament hosted in Doha, Qatar
- Central European International Cup, a football competition held 1927–1960
- Chicago Sister Cities International Cup, a tournament held in 2010 in Chicago, Illinois
- International Champions Cup, an annual football competition held 2013–2019
- Premier League International Cup, an English football competition for U23 players from across Europe
- Quaid-e-Azam International Cup, an annual football tournament held in Pakistan, 1976–1987
- Women's International Champions Cup, an annual football competition held since 2018

== Golf competitions ==
- Lakes International Cup, a men's team golf competition between Australia and the United States, held 1934–1954
- Ranelagh International Cup, an amateur team golf championship for women, held in London 1901–1936

== Other sports ==
- Australian Football International Cup, a triennial Australian rules football competition
- BH Tennis Open International Cup, a tennis tournament held annually as part of the ATP Challenger Tour
- Express Eventing International Cup, an equestrian event held in 2008 in Cardiff, Wales
- International Cup of Nice, a figure skating competition held annually in France
- International Polo Cup, a polo competition between England and the United States, held intermittently since 1886
- Pacific International Cup, a curling competition held annually in Richmond, British Columbia
- Serendib International Cup, a rugby union competition held in Sri Lanka in 2013
- Singapore Airlines International Cup, a horse race held annually at Kranji Racecourse

== See also ==
- Cup (unit)
- Champions Cup (disambiguation)
- Intercontinental Cup (disambiguation)
- President's Cup (disambiguation)
- World Cup (disambiguation)
