= WNBA-NBC Champions League (men) =

- Sport: Nine-pin bowling
- Founded: 2002
- No. of teams: 16
- Country: WNBA-NBC members
- Most recent champion: (Croatia) KK Zaprešić (2nd title)
- Most titles: (Germany) SKV Rot Weiss Zerbst (6 titles)
- Website: Website

The WNBA-NBC Champions League is the annual competition for nine-pin bowling classic men's clubs, organized by the World Ninepin Bowling Association. It is playing since 2002, and the first season the competition was named as Euroleague.

== Competition formula ==
WNBA-NBC Champions League tournament has a stable competition formula. The following rules apply:

=== Qualification ===
- 16 teams participate in each event.
- Most recent champions are always pre-qualified.
- Top seven teams from the Team World Cup.
- Top five teams from the Team European Cup.
- Top three teams from the Team NBC Cup.

Vacant starting-places will occupy after the ranking exclusively with participants in the Team’s World Cup.

=== Competition format ===
All qualified teams are divided into two pots (seeded and unseeded) and then drawn into a bracket of 16 teams during an official ceremony. The knock-out ties are played in a two-legged format, with the exception of the final four. The Final Four usually takes place in the weekend at the turn of March and April.

- Seeded teams:
  - Title holder
  - World Cup winner
  - World Cup runner-up
  - 3rd team of World Cup
  - 4th team of World Cup
  - European Cup winner
  - European Cup runner-up
  - NBC Cup winner

== Records and statistics ==
=== Final Four ===
WNBA-NBC Champions League
Season	Final four host	Champion	Score	Second place	Third place	Score	Fourth place
2001-02	Hunedoara, Romania	(Slovenia); KK Triglav Iskraemeco Kranj	Total result	(Germany); SKC Victoria Bamberg	(Croatia); KK Kandit-Premijer Osijek	Total result	(Hungary); MEH Szeged
2002-03	Bozen, Italy	(Germany); SKC Victoria Bamberg	Total result	(Slovakia); Železiarne Podbrezová Šport	(Croatia); KK Kandit-Premijer Osijek	Total result	
2003-04	Hagenwerder, Germany	(Croatia); KK Kandit-Premijer Osijek	6 - 2	(Slovenia); KK Triglav Kranj	(Germany); SKC Victoria Bamberg	7 - 1	(Germany); SKC Staffelberg Staffelstein
2004-05	Osijek, Croatia	(Germany); SKC Victoria Bamberg	6 - 2	(Hungary); Ferroep-Szeged TE	(Croatia); KK Konikom-Osijek	8 - 0	(Hungary); Zalaegerszeg TK
2005-06	Hunedoara, Romania	(Hungary); Ferroep-Szeged TE	5 - 3	(Slovakia); Železiarne Podbrezová Šport	(Hungary); Zalaegerszeg TK	8 - 0	(Poland); KS Polonia 1912 Leszno
2006-07	Podbrezová, Slovakia	(Croatia); KK Zadar	6 - 2	(Croatia); KK Konikom-Osijek	(Germany); SKV Rot-Weiß Zerbst 1999	7 - 1	(Hungary); Ferroep-Szeged TE
2007-08	Zalaegerszeg, Hungary	(Hungary); Zalaegerszegi TK FMVaS	6 - 2	(Croatia); KK Zadar	(Germany); SKV Rot-Weiß Zerbst 1999	4.5 - 3.5	(Slovakia); Železiarne Podbrezová Šport
2008-09	Koblach, Austria	(Germany); SKC Victoria 1947 Bamberg	7 - 1	(Germany); SKV Rot-Weiß Zerbst 1999	(Hungary); Zalaegerszegi TK FMVaS	5 - 3	(Hungary); Szegedi TE - Gabonatransz
2009-10	Apatin, Serbia	(Germany); SKV Rot-Weiß Zerbst 1999	6 - 2	(Hungary); Szegedi TE - Gabonatransz	(Hungary); Zalaegerszegi TK FMVaS	6 - 2	(Germany); SKC Victoria 1947 Bamberg
2010-11	Bad Langensalza, Germany	(Slovakia); Železiarne Podbrezová Šport	5 - 3	(Germany); SKV Rot-Weiß Zerbst 1999	(Hungary); Szegedi TE	6 - 2	(Croatia); KK Zadar
2011-12	Celje, Slovenia	(Slovakia); Železiarne Podbrezová Šport	6 - 2	(Germany); SKC Victoria 1947 Bamberg	(Germany); SKV Rot-Weiß Zerbst 1999	6 - 2	(Croatia); KK Zaprešić
2012-13	Podbrezová, Slovakia	(Hungary); Szegedi TE	6 - 2	(Slovakia); ŽP Šport Podbrezová	(Serbia); KK Beograd	6 - 2	(Austria); BSV Voith St. Pölten
2013-14	Straubing, Germany	(Hungary); Szegedi TE	5 - 3	(Croatia); KK Zadar	(Germany); SKV Rot-Weiß Zerbst 1999	6 - 2	(Croatia); KK Zaprešić
2014-15	Straubing, Germany	(Germany); SKV Rot-Weiß Zerbst 1999	5 - 3	(Hungary); Szegedi TE	(Slovakia); ŽP Šport Podbrezová	5 - 3	(Serbia); KK Beograd
2015-16	Bamberg, Germany	(Hungary); Szegedi TE	7 - 1	(Germany); SKC Victoria 1947 Bamberg	(Germany); SKV Rot-Weiß Zerbst 1999	6.5 - 1.5	(Slovakia); ŽP Šport Podbrezová
2016-17	Podbrezová, Slovakia	(Germany); SKV Rot-Weiß Zerbst 1999	6 - 2	(Hungary); Alabardos Szegedi TE	(Slovakia); ŽP Šport Podbrezová	5.5 - 2.5	(Croatia); KK Zaprešić
2017-18	Bamberg, Germany	(Slovakia); ŽP Šport Podbrezová	6 - 2	(Germany); SKV Rot-Weiß Zerbst 1999	(Germany); KS Schwabsberg	6 - 2	(Hungary); Alabardos Szegedi TE
2018-19	Zaprešić, Croatia	(Croatia); KK Zaprešić	6 - 2	(Slovakia); ŠK Železiarne Podbrezová	(Germany); SKV Rot-Weiß Zerbst 1999	5.5 - 2.5	(Hungary); Szegedi TE
~~2019-20~~ (Note: Due to the COVID-19 pandemic, Champions League Final Four 2019-20 has been postponed to May 2021.); 2020-21	Bamberg, Germany	(Germany); SKV Rot-Weiß Zerbst 1999	7 - 1	(Hungary); Zengő Alföld Szegedi TE	(Croatia); KK Mertojak Split	6 - 2	(Croatia); KK Zaprešić
2021-22	Pápa, Hungary	(Slovakia); ŠK Železiarne Podbrezová	4.5 - 3.5	(Germany); SKV Rot-Weiß Zerbst 1999	(Italy); KK Neumarkt Imperial-Life	6 - 2	(Germany); SKK Chambtalkegler Raindorf
2022-23	Graz, Austria	(Germany); SKV Rot-Weiß Zerbst 1999	7 - 1	(Austria); KSK Union Orth/Donau	(Croatia); KK Zadar	5 - 3	(Croatia); KK Mertojak Split
2023-24	Bačka Topola, Serbia	(Germany); SKV Rot-Weiß Zerbst 1999	5 - 3	(Croatia); KK Zaprešić	(Germany); SKK Chambtalkegler Raindorf	5 - 3	(Slovakia); ŠK Železiarne Podbrezová
2024-25	Morfelden, Germany	(Germany); SKK Chambtalkegler Raindorf	6 - 2	(Austria); KSK Union Orth/Donau	(Germany); SKV Rot-Weiß Zerbst 1999	6 - 2	(Croatia); KK Mertojak Split
2025-26	Brčko, Bosnia-Herzegovina	(Croatia); KK Zaprešić	6 - 2	(Germany); SKK Chambtalkegler Raindorf	(Hungary); Zalaegerszegi TK	6 - 2	(Germany); SKV Rot-Weiß Zerbst 1999
2026-27	Morfelden, Germany						
2027-28	Debrecen, Hungary						

=== Winning clubs ===
Performances in the Final Four of WNBA-NBC Champions League by club
Club	Titles	Years won	Runners-up	Top 4
(Germany) SKV Rot-Weiß Zerbst 1999	6	2010, 2015, 2017, 2021, 2023, 2024	4	18
(Hungary) Szegedi TE	4	2006, 2013, 2014, 2016	5	15
(Slovakia) ŠK Železiarne Podbrezová	4	2011, 2012, 2018, 2022	4	13
(Germany) SKC Victoria 1947 Bamberg	3	2003, 2005, 2009	3	8
(Croatia) KK Zaprešić	2	2019, 2026	1	7
(Croatia) KK Zadar	1	2007	2	5
(Croatia) KK Osijek	1	2004	1	5
(Slovenia) KK Triglav Kranj	1	2002	1	2
(Hungary) Zalaegerszegi TK	1	2008	0	6
(Germany) SKK Chambtalkegler Raindorf	1	2025	1	4
(Austria) KSK Union Orth/Donau	0	—	2	1
(Croatia) KK Mertojak Split	0	—	0	3
(Serbia) KK Beograd	0	—	0	2
(Austria) BSV Voith St. Pölten	0	—	0	1
(Germany) KS Schwabsberg	0	—	0	1
(Germany) SKC Staffelberg Staffelstein	0	—	0	1
(Italy) KK Neumarkt Imperial-Life	0	—	0	1
(Poland) KS Polonia 1912 Leszno	0	—	0	1

=== Performances by nation ===
Performances in the Final Four by nation
Nation	Titles	Runners-up	Top 4
Germany	10	7	32
Hungary	5	5	21
Croatia	4	4	20
Slovakia	4	3	13
Slovenia	1	1	2
Austria	0	2	3
Serbia	0	0	2
Italy	0	0	1
Poland	0	0	1
