= World Team Ninepin Bowling Classic Championships =

- Status: active
- Genre: sporting event
- Date: May - second half
- Frequency: biennial (odd years)
- Location: various
- Country: varying
- Inaugurated: 2005
- Most recent: 2025
- Next event: 2027
- Organiser: WNBA NBC
- Website: www.wnba-nbc.com

The World Team Ninepin Bowling Classic Championships is a biennial nine-pin bowling competition organized by the World Ninepin Bowling Association (WNBA NBC). The World Championships was started in 2005, after dividing the championships into Team and Singles.

The sprint events took place only during the first championships in Novi Sad. Since 2009, the World Team Championships have in the program only team tournaments, after removing mixed tandems.

== Editions ==
Edition	Year	City	Country	Date	Events	Men's Team World Champions	Women's Team World Champions	Notes
1st	2005	Novi Sad	Serbia and Montenegro	30 May - 4 Jun	5	Germany	Romania	Only with Sprint
2nd	2007	Košice	Slovakia	20 - 26 May	3	Hungary	Slovenia	Last with Mixed tandems
3rd	2009	Dettenheim	Germany	17 - 23 May	2	Serbia	Germany	
4th	2011	Sarajevo	Bosnia and Herzegovina	19 - 28 May	2	Serbia	Hungary	
5th	2013	Zalaegerszeg	Hungary	15 - 25 May	2	Hungary	Hungary	
6th	2015	Speichersdorf	Germany (2)	13 - 23 May	2	Serbia	Croatia	
7th	2017	Dettenheim (2)	Germany (3)	18 - 27 May	2	Serbia	Germany	
8th	2019	Rokycany	Czech Republic	16 - 26 May	2	Serbia	Croatia	
9th	2021	Tarnowo Podgórne	Poland	23 - 30 Oct	2	Serbia	Germany	Postponed due the COVID-19 pandemic
10th	2023	Varaždin	Croatia	17 - 28 May	2	Austria	Croatia	
11th	2025	Székesfehérvár	Hungary (2)	28 May - 7 Jun	2	Serbia	Croatia	
12th	2027	Altenburg	Germany (4)	26 May - 6 Jun	2			
13th	2031	Zell am Harmersbach	Germany (5)	28 May - 8 Jun	2			

== Medal count ==
Rank	Nation	Gold	Silver	Bronze	Total
1	Serbia	7	0	2	9
2	Croatia	5	2	7	14
3	Germany	4	11	4	19
4	Hungary	4	3	6	13
5	Czech Republic	2	1	6	9
6	Romania	1	5	3	9
7	Austria	1	2	5	8
8	Slovenia	1	0	6	7
9	Serbia and Montenegro	1	0	0	1
10	France	0	1	0	1
10	North Macedonia	0	1	0	1
12	Slovakia	0	0	1	1
Totals (12 entries)		26	26	40	92

== List of hosts ==
List of hosts by number of championships hosted.

Times hosted	Host	Year(s)
5	Germany	2009, 2015, 2017, ~~2021~~, (2027), (2031)
2	Hungary	2013, 2025
1	Bosnia and Herzegovina	2011
1	Croatia	2023
1	Czech Republic	2019
1	Poland	2021
1	Serbia and Montenegro	2005
1	Slovakia	2007

== See also ==
- World Ninepin Bowling Classic Championships
