= Serbia men's national 9-pin bowling team =

National men's nine-pin bowling team representing Serbia

Serbia
- Sport: Nine-pin bowling
- Affiliation: World Ninepin Bowling Association
- Regional affiliation: Europe
- (Serbia)

The Serbia men's national 9-pin bowling team represents Serbia in international nine-pin bowling competitions and is governed by the Serbian Bowling Federation.

The team is considered one of the most successful national teams in the history of the sport, having won multiple gold medals at the World Ninepin Bowling Association World Championships and European competitions.

== History ==
Nine-pin bowling has a long tradition in Serbia and the former Yugoslavia. Since the early 2000s, Serbia has emerged as one of the dominant nations in international competition, regularly finishing on the podium at World and European championships.

The national team has won several world titles and is widely regarded as one of the strongest men's squads in Europe.

== Major achievements ==
=== World Championships ===
- Multiple gold medals at the World Team Championships
- World champions (2021)
- World champions (2025)

=== European Championships ===
- Multiple medals in European competitions organized by the WNBC

== Governance ==
The team is administered by the Kuglaški savez Srbije, the official governing body for nine-pin bowling in Serbia.

== See also ==
- Nine-pin bowling
- Sport in Serbia
