= Champions League (disambiguation) =

UEFA Champions League is an annual European club association football competition.

Champions League may also refer to:

== Association football ==
=== Men's ===
- CONCACAF Champions Cup, formerly CONCACAF Champions League
- AFC Champions League Elite, formerly AFC Champions League, in Asia
  - AFC Champions League Two
- CAF Champions League, in Africa
- OFC Men's Champions League, in Oceania
- Arab Club Champions Cup, formerly Arab Champions League
- GFF Gulf Club Champions League, formerly GCC Champions League

=== Women's ===
- UEFA Women's Champions League, in Europe
- CAF Women's Champions League, in Africa
- AFC Women's Champions League, in Asia
- OFC Women's Champions League, in Oceania

== Volleyball ==
=== Men's ===
- CEV Champions League, in Europe
- AVC Men's Volleyball Champions League, in Asia and Oceania

=== Women's ===
- CEV Women's Champions League, in Europe
- AVC Women's Volleyball Champions League, in Asia and Oceania

== Other sports ==
- UEFA Futsal Champions League, in Europe
- WSE Champions League, for roller hockey in Europe
- EHF Champions League, for handball in Europe
- EHF Women's Champions League, for handball in Europe
- WNBA-NBC Champions League (men), for nine-pin bowling in Europe
- WNBA-NBC Champions League (women), for nine-pin bowling in Europe
- European Champions League (table tennis)
- Champions League of Darts
- LEN Champions League, for water polo clubs in Europe
- Baseball Champions League Americas
- Baseball Champions League Europe
- Basketball Champions League, in Europe
- Champions League Twenty20, for cricket
- Philippine Collegiate Champions League, for basketball
- Champions League (judo), in Europe
- UCI Track Champions League, for track cyclists

== See also ==
- Champions Cup (disambiguation)
- Championship League, for snooker
- Championship League Darts
- League of Champions, a fictional superhero team
- Champions Hockey League, for ice hockey in Europe, launched in the 2014–15 season
- Champions Hockey League (2008–09), for ice hockey in Europe
- Copa Libertadores, an annual South American club football competition
