= WNBA-NBC Champions League (women) =

- Sport: Nine-pin bowling
- Founded: 2002
- No. of teams: 16
- Country: WNBA-NBC members
- Most recent champions: (Germany) Victoria Bamberg (11th title)
- Most titles: (Germany) Victoria Bamberg (11 titles)
- Website: Website

The WNBA-NBC Champions League is the annual competition for nine-pin bowling classic women's clubs, organized by the World Ninepin Bowling Association. It is playing since 2002, and the first season the competition was named as Euroleague.

== Competition formula ==
WNBA-NBC Champions League tournament has a stable competition formula. The following rules apply:

=== Qualification ===
- 16 teams participate in each event.
- Most recent champions are always pre-qualified.
- Top seven teams from the Team World Cup.
- Top five teams from the Team European Cup.
- Top three teams from the Team NBC Cup.

Vacant starting-places will occupy after the ranking exclusively with participants in the Team’s World Cup.

=== Competition format ===
All qualified teams are divided into two pots (seeded and unseeded) and then drawn into a bracket of 16 teams during an official ceremony. The knock-out ties are played in a two-legged format, with the exception of the final four. The Final Four usually takes place in the weekend at the turn of March and April.

- Seeded teams:
  - Title holder
  - World Cup winner
  - World Cup runner-up
  - 3rd team of World Cup
  - 4th team of World Cup
  - European Cup winner
  - European Cup runner-up
  - NBC Cup winner

== Records and statistics ==
=== Final Four ===
WNBA-NBC Champions League
Season	Final four host	Champion	Score	Second place	Third place	Score	Fourth place
2001-02	Hunedoara, Romania	(Romania); CS Electromureş Romgaz Târgu Mureș	Total result	(Croatia); KK Rijeka-Kvarner W.S.O.	(Germany); SKC Victoria Bamberg	Total result	(Czech Republic); KK Slavia Prague
2002-03	Bozen, Italy	(Germany); SKC Victoria Bamberg	Total result	(Slovenia); KK Miroteks Celje	(Czech Republic); KK Slavia Prague	Total result	
2003-04	Hagenwerder, Germany	(Slovenia); KK Miroteks Celje	5 - 3	(Croatia); ŠKK Podravka Koprivnica	(Romania); CS Electromureş Romgaz Târgu Mureș	6 - 2	(Germany); SKC Victoria Bamberg
2004-05	Osijek, Croatia	(Germany); SKC Victoria Bamberg	6 - 2	(Slovenia); KK Miroteks Celje	(Croatia); ŠKK Podravka Koprivnica	7 - 1	(Hungary); FTC Budapest
2005-06	Hunedoara, Romania	(Romania); CS Electromureş Romgaz Târgu Mureș	7 - 1	(Austria); BBSV Vienna	(Slovakia); KK Tatran Prefa Sučany	5 - 3	(Croatia); ŠKK Podravka Koprivnica
2006-07	Podbrezova, Slovakia	(Germany); SKC Victoria 1947 Bamberg	5 - 3	(Croatia); ŠKK Podravka Koprivnica	(Romania); CS Electromureş Romgaz Târgu Mureș	5 - 3	(Slovenia); KK Brest Cerknica
2007-08	Zalaegerszeg, Hungary	(Slovenia); KK Miroteks Celje	6 - 2	(Hungary); ZTE-ZAEV Nöi Zalaegerszeg	(Croatia); ŠKK Podravka Koprivnica	5 - 3	(Germany); SKC Victoria 1947 Bamberg
2008-09	Koblach, Austria	(Germany); SKC Victoria 1947 Bamberg	7 - 1	(Serbia); KK Pionir Subotica	(Slovenia); KK Miroteks Celje	8 - 0	(Poland); KS Polonia 1912 Leszno
2009-10	Apatin, Serbia	(Germany); SKC Victoria 1947 Bamberg	6.5 - 1.5	(Slovenia); KK Lanteks Celje	(Romania); CS Electromureş Târgu Mureș	7 - 1	(Serbia); KK Pionir Subotica
2010-11	Bad Langensalza, Germany	(Slovenia); KK Lanteks Celje	8 - 0	(Serbia); KK Pionir Subotica	(Germany); SKC Victoria 1947 Bamberg	6 - 2	(Romania); CS Electromureş Târgu Mureș
2011-12	Celje, Slovenia	(Slovenia); KK Lanteks Celje	5 - 3	(Germany); SKC Victoria 1947 Bamberg	(Romania); SC Conpet-Petrolul Ploiești	6 - 2	(Austria); ASKÖ KSC Schneegattern
2012-13	Podbrezova, Slovakia	(Germany); SKC Victoria 1947 Bamberg	5 - 3	(Slovenia); KK Lanteks Celje	(Romania); CS Romgaz Târgu Mureș	5 - 3	(Serbia); KK Pionir Subotica
2013-14	Straubing, Germany	(Slovenia); KK Celje	5 - 3	(Germany); SKC Victoria 1947 Bamberg	(Serbia); KK Pionir Subotica	7.5 - 0.5	(Croatia); KK Mlaka
2014-15	Straubing, Germany	(Slovenia); KK Celje	6 - 2	(Germany); SKC Victoria 1947 Bamberg	(Croatia); KK Mlaka	6 - 2	(Serbia); KK Pionir Subotica
2015-16	Bamberg, Germany	(Austria); BBSV Vienna	5.5 - 2.5	(Germany); SKC Victoria 1947 Bamberg	(Croatia); KK Mlaka	5 - 3	(Croatia); KK Admiral Zagreb
2016-17	Podbrezova, Slovakia	(Germany); SKC Victoria 1947 Bamberg	7 - 1	(Austria); BBSV Vienna	(Slovenia); KK Celje	7 - 1	(Croatia); KK Mlaka
2017-18	Bamberg, Germany	(Germany); SKC Victoria 1947 Bamberg	7 - 1	(Romania); CS Electromureş Romgaz Târgu Mureș	(Czech Republic); KK Slovan Rosice	5 - 3	(Slovenia); KK Celje
2018-19	Zaprešić, Croatia	(Germany); SKC Victoria 1947 Bamberg	6 - 2	(Croatia); KK Mlaka	(Czech Republic); KK Slovan Rosice	6 - 2	(Austria); BBSV Vienna
~~2019-20~~ (Note: Due to the COVID-19 pandemic, Champions League Final Four 2019-20 has been postponed to May 2021.); 2020-21	Bamberg, Germany	(Germany); SKC Victoria 1947 Bamberg	6 - 2	(Croatia); KK Mlaka	(Romania); CS Electromureş Romgaz Târgu Mureș	No score Slovan withdrew	(Czech Republic); KK Slovan Rosice
2021-22	Győr, Hungary	(Croatia); KK Mlaka	4 - 4 (13 - 11)	(Germany); SKC Victoria 1947 Bamberg	(Austria); SK FWT-Composites Neunkirchen	5 - 3	(Romania); CS Electromureş Romgaz Târgu Mureș
2022-23	Graz, Austria	(Austria); SK FWT-Composites Neunkirchen	4 - 4; 56 - 53 (SV)	(Germany); SKC Victoria 1947 Bamberg	(Germany); SV Pöllwitz	7 - 1	(Croatia); ŽKK Istra Poreč
2023-24	Bačka Topola, Serbia	(Croatia); KK Mlaka	5 - 3	(Germany); SV Pöllwitz	(Czech Republic); KK Slovan Rosice	4 - 4; 64 - 47 (SV)	(Serbia); KK Alimenta
2024-25	Morfelden, Germany	(Czech Republic); KK Slovan Rosice	7 - 1	(Germany); KV Liedolsheim	(Croatia); KK Mlaka	7 - 1	(Germany); SV Pöllwitz
2025-26	Brčko, Bosnia-Herzegovina	(Germany); SKC Victoria 1947 Bamberg	5 - 3	(Croatia); KK Mlaka	(Austria); SK FWT-Composites Neunkirchen	7 - 1	(Hungary); Tatabányai SC
2026-27	Morfelden, Germany						
2027-28	Debrecen, Hungary						

=== Winning clubs ===
Performances in the Final Four of WNBA-NBC Champions League by club
Club	Titles	Years won	Runners-up	Top 4
(Germany) SKC Victoria 1947 Bamberg	11	2003, 2005, 2007, 2009, 2010, 2013, 2017, 2018, 2019, 2021, 2026	6	21
(Slovenia) KK Celje	6	2004, 2008, 2011, 2012, 2014, 2015	4	13
(Croatia) KK Mlaka	2	2022, 2024	3	10
(Romania) CS Electromureş Romgaz Târgu Mureș	2	2002, 2006	1	10
(Austria) BBSV Vienna	1	2016	2	4
(Czech Republic) KK Slovan Rosice	1	2025	0	5
(Austria) SK FWT-Composites Neunkirchen	1	2023	0	3
(Serbia) KK Pionir Subotica	0	—	2	9
(Croatia) ŠKK Podravka Koprivnica	0	—	2	5
(Germany) SV Pöllwitz	0	—	1	3
(Croatia) KK Rijeka-Kvarner W.S.O.	0	—	1	1
(Germany) KV Liedolsheim	0	—	1	1
(Hungary) ZTE-ZAEV Nöi Zalaegerszeg	0	—	1	1
(Czech Republic) KK Slavia Prague	0	—	0	2
(Austria) ASKÖ KSC Schneegattern	0	—	0	1
(Croatia) KK Admiral Zagreb	0	—	0	1
(Croatia) ŽKK Istra Poreč	0	—	0	1
(Hungary) FTC Budapest	0	—	0	1
(Hungary) Tatabányai SC	0	—	0	1
(Poland) KS Polonia 1912 Leszno	0	—	0	1
(Romania) SC Conpet-Petrolul Ploiești	0	—	0	1
(Serbia) KK Alimenta	0	—	0	1
(Slovakia) KK Tatran Prefa Sučany	0	—	0	1
(Slovenia) KK Brest Cerknica	0	—	0	1

=== Performances by nation ===
Performances in the Final Four by nation
Nation	Titles	Runners-up	Top 4
Germany	11	8	25
Slovenia	6	4	14
Croatia	2	6	18
Austria	2	2	8
Romania	2	1	11
Czech Republic	1	0	7
Serbia	0	2	7
Hungary	0	1	3
Poland	0	0	1
Slovakia	0	0	1
