= Ninepin Bowling Classic Singles World Cup =

European bowling competition

- Status: inactive
- Genre: sporting event
- Frequency: Until 2003 - annual Since 2003 - biennial (odd years)
- Location: various
- Country: varying
- Inaugurated: 1989
- Most recent: 2023
- Next event: discontinued
- Organiser: WNBA NBC
- Website: www.wnba-nbc.com

The Ninepin Bowling Classic Singles World Cup was a biennial nine-pin bowling competition organized by the World Ninepin Bowling Association (WNBA NBC). The World Cup was started in 1989 and until 2003 took place every year. The next one was held in 2004 and take place biennially since then.

The formula of the competition has changed many times. Since 2003, it has been played in the KO system. Since 2005 games for the 3rd place were not played, but two bronze medals were awarded. Since 2009, the World Cup was held simultaneously with the U23 World Cup.

The 2023 edition was the last held. Due to changes in the WNBA-NBC calendar, the World Cup will be replaced with the European Championship.

== List of championships ==
Edition	Year	City	Country	Women's winner	Men's winner	Notes
1st	1989	Steyr	Austria	(Socialist Federal Republic of Yugoslavia) Antonia Škafar	(Hungary) Béla Csányi	
2nd	1990	Eppelheim	Germany	-	-	The competition was canceled due to an insufficient number of participants
3rd	1991	Budapest	Hungary	(Germany) Claudia Schumann	(Hungary) József Mészáros	Combination: (Czech Republic) Naděžda Dobešová; (Hungary) József Mészáros
4th	1992	Tomaszów Mazowiecki	Poland	(Czech Republic) Naděžda Dobešová	(Slovenia) Franc Kirbiš	Combination: (Czech Republic) Naděžda Dobešová; (Germany) Friedhelm Zänger
5th	1993	Zagreb	Croatia	(Croatia) Biserka Perman	(Romania) Leontin Popp	Combination: (Croatia) Biserka Perman; (Croatia) Cvitan Vučak
6th	1994	Tramin	Italy	(Italy) Cilly Ploner	(Federal Republic of Yugoslavia) Arpad Boroš	
7th	1995	Blansko	Slovakia	(Hungary) Ágota Kovácsné Grampsch	(Slovenia) Albin Juvančič	
8th	1996	Vienna	Austria (2)	(Germany) Beate Schönerstedt	(Slovenia) Uroš Stoklas	
9th	1997	Kelsterbach	Germany (2)	(Germany) Claudia Hoffmann	(Romania) Nicolae Lupu	
10th	1998	Bratislava	Slovakia (2)	(Germany) Claudia Hoffmann	(Romania) Petrut Mihalcioiu	
11th	1999	Skopje	Macedonia	(Croatia) Elda Sinovčić	(Italy) Josef Sieder	
12th	2000	Hallein	Austria (3)	(Germany) Claudia Hoffmann	(Croatia) Branislav Bogdanović	
13th	2001	Budapest (2)	Hungary (2)	(Federal Republic of Yugoslavia) Sanela Nović Suturović	(Slovenia) Franc Kirbiš	
14th	2002	Klagenfurt	Austria (4)	(Federal Republic of Yugoslavia) Sandra Matešić	(Croatia) Branislav Bogdanović	
15th	2003	Skopje (2)	Macedonia (2)	(Poland) Beata Włodarczyk	(Slovenia) Uroš Stoklas	
16th	2005	Celje	Slovenia	(Poland) Beata Włodarczyk	(Croatia) Branislav Bogdanović	
17th	2007	Klagenfurt (2)	Austria (5)	(Romania) Daniela Muntean	(Croatia) Matko Bulka	
18th	2009	Rijeka	Croatia (2)	(Slovenia) Barbara Fidel	(Croatia) Mario Mušanić	
19th	2011	Tallinn	Estonia	(Poland) Beata Włodarczyk	(Slovakia) Ivan Čech	
20th	2013	Zalaegerszeg	Hungary (3)	(Slovenia) Eva Sajko	(Croatia) Matko Bulka	
21st	2015	Hirschau	Germany (3)	(Croatia) Nataša Ravnić Gašparini	(Hungary) Norbert Kiss	
22nd	2017	Straubing	Germany (4)	(Czech Republic) Hana Wiedermannová	(Serbia) Vilmoš Zavarko	
23rd	2019	Přerov	Czech Republic	(Hungary) Anita Méhész	(Serbia) Vilmoš Zavarko	
-	~~2021~~	Schönebeck	Germany			Cancelled due the COVID-19 pandemic
24th	2023	Rijeka (2)	Croatia (3)	(Germany) Anna Müller	(Austria) Lukas Huber	

== Medal count ==
Rank	Nation	Gold	Silver	Bronze	Total
1	Croatia	12	5	8	25
2	Slovenia	7	8	5	20
3	Germany	6	12	4	22
4	Hungary	6	5	13	24
5	Czech Republic	5	3	6	14
6	Romania	4	5	5	14
7	Poland	3	3	4	10
8	(Federal Republic of Yugoslavia) FR Yugoslavia	3	0	2	5
9	Serbia	2	2	5	9
10	Italy	2	0	0	2
11	Slovakia	1	3	4	8
12	Austria	1	2	5	8
13	Yugoslavia	1	1	3	5
14	Macedonia	0	1	1	2
15	Bosnia and Herzegovina	0	1	0	1
15	Estonia	0	1	0	1
17	France	0	0	2	2
18	West Germany	0	0	1	1
Totals (18 entries)		53	52	68	173

== List of hosts ==
List of hosts by number of competitions hosted.

Times hosted	Host	Year(s)
5	Austria	1989, 1996, 2000, 2002, 2007
4	Germany	1990, 1997, 2015, 2017, ~~2021~~
3	Croatia	1993, 2009, 2023
3	Hungary	1991, 2001, 2013
2	Macedonia	1999, 2003
2	Slovakia	1995, 1998
1	Czech Republic	2019
1	Estonia	2011
1	Italy	1994
1	Poland	1992
1	Slovenia	2005
