= 2025 World Team Ninepin Bowling Classic Championships – Women's tournament =

Tournament details
- Host country: Hungary
- City: Székesfehérvár
- Venue: 1 (in 1 host city)
- Dates: 29 May - 7 June
- Teams: 15

Final positions
- Champions: Croatia (4th title)
- Runners-up: Germany
- Third place: Czech Republic; Hungary

Tournament statistics
- Matches played: 28
- Top scorers: Player: (Germany) Alina Dollheimer 671; Team: Croatia 3724

The women's tournament at the 2025 World Team Ninepin Bowling Classic Championships was hold in Székesfehérvár, Hungary, from 29 May to 7 June 2025.

== Participating teams ==
15 associations applied to participate in the women's teams competition.

- Austria
- Croatia
- Czechia
- Denmark
- Estonia
- France
- Germany
- Hungary
- Italy
- North Macedonia
- Poland
- Romania
- Serbia
- Slovakia
- Slovenia

=== Draw ===
Groups were drawn on December 16, 2024, during the conference in Székesfehérvár.

Pot 1	Pot 2	Pot 3	Pot 4
Austria; Croatia; Germany; Romania	Czechia; Hungary (hosts); Serbia; Slovenia	Estonia; France; Italy; Slovakia	Denmark; North Macedonia; Poland

=== Groups ===
Group A	Group B	Group C	Group D
Germany; Serbia; Slovakia; Denmark	Romania; Hungary (hosts); France; Poland	Croatia; Slovenia; Estonia; North Macedonia	Austria; Czechia; Italy

== Group stage ==
=== Group A ===
		Pts	Matches			Team points		Set points		Qualification
Rank	Team	Pts	W	D	L	W	L	W	L	Qualification
1	Germany	6	3	0	0	22	2	56.5	15.5	Advance to quarterfinals
2	Serbia	4	2	0	1	14.5	9.5	41.5	30.5	Advance to quarterfinals
3	Slovakia	2	1	0	2	11	13	35.5	36.5	
4	Denmark	0	0	0	3	0.5	23.5	10.5	61.5	

29 May 2025
14:40 CEST

Serbia	7 – 1	Slovakia
3562 14.5	Report	9.5 3411
Vladana Obrenić 583 3.0		1.0 547 Žaneta Bednárová
Jasmina Rašković 653 4.0		0.0 566 Jana Poliaková
Ljiljana Frenc 573 0.5		3.5 604 Naďa Poliaková
( (substituted on) 61 Nada Komanov) Brigitta Zolnai 589 2.5		1.5 577 Vladimíra Vávrová
Dijana Kormanjos 586 2.5		1.5 586 Júlia Pramuková
( (substituted on) 26 Kristina Trošić) Olivera Čikoš 578 2.0		2.0 541 Lenka Stasinková

Alba Aréna, Székesfehérvár

29 May 2025
18:20 CEST

Germany	8 – 0	Denmark
3663 21.5	Report	2.5 3036
Bianca Golla 639 4.0		0.0 511 Ena Emma Bargholz
Luisa Ebert 625 4.0		0.0 497 Helene Holst Jensen
Sandra Sellner 610 3.0		1.0 542 Louise Irene Kreutzfeldt
Sarah Conrad 617 4.0		0.0 488 Linda Holst Bille ( (substituted on) 43 Mathilde Blicher Steensen)
Alina Dollheimer 594 3.0		1.0 509 Brigitte Kreutzfeldt
Paula Marlene Straub 578 3.5		0.5 489 Lea Katrine Mikkelsen

Alba Aréna, Székesfehérvár

31 May 2025
08:30 CEST

Serbia	7.5 – 0.5	Denmark
3400 21.0	Report	3.0 3037
Nada Komanov 548 3.0		1.0 509 Mathilde Blicher Steensen
Jasmina Rašković 606 4.0		0.0 491 Louise Irene Kreutzfeldt
Kristina Trošić 572 4.0		0.0 490 Lea Katrine Mikkelsen
( (substituted on) 61 Vladana Obrenić) Dijana Kormanjos 564 2.0		2.0 564 Birgitte Kreutzfeldt
Ljiljana Frenc 562 4.0		0.0 490 Ena Emma Bargholz
( (substituted on) 61 Jelena Santo) Brigitta Zolnai 548 4.0		0.0 493 Helene Holst Jensen

Alba Aréna, Székesfehérvár

31 May 2025
11:00 CEST

Slovakia	2 – 6	Germany
3396 7.0	Report	17.0 3609
Vladimíra Vávrová 594 1.0		3.0 620 Celine Zenker
( (substituted on) 55 Dominika Laurová) Alexandra Ďuračková 511 0.0		4.0 640 Bianca Golla
Lenka Stašinková 585 2.0		2.0 582 Sandra Sellner
Júlia Pramuková 555 1.0		3.0 597 Luisa Ebert
Jana Poliaková 570 1.0		3.0 614 Saskia Seitz ( (substituted on) 61 Alina Dollheimer)
Nada Poliaková 581 2.0		2.0 556 Paula Marlene Straub ( (substituted on) 91 Sarah Conrad)

Alba Aréna, Székesfehérvár

2 June 2025
11:00 CEST

Denmark	0 – 8	Slovakia
2998 5.0	Report	19.0 3352
Helene Holst Jensen 512 0.0		4.0 548 Vladimíra Vávrová
Linda Holst Bille 457 0.0		4.0 553 Žaneta Bednárová
Ena Emma Bargholz 532 2.0		2.0 575 Júlia Pramuková
Louise Irene Kreutzfeldt 524 2.0		2.0 547 Dominika Laurová
Mathilde Blicher Steensen 495 1.0		3.0 566 Lenka Stasinková
Birgitte Kreutzfeldt 478 0.0		4.0 563 Alexandra Duráčková

Alba Aréna, Székesfehérvár

2 June 2025
18:20 CEST

Germany	8 – 0	Serbia
3717 18.0	Report	6.0 3443
Bianca Golla 621 2.0		2.0 620 Jasmina Rašković
Celine Zenker 613 2.0		2.0 565 Kristina Trošić
Luisa Ebert 579 3.0		1.0 581 Nada Komanov
Sarah Conrad 587 4.0		0.0 544 Ljiljana Frenc ( (substituted on) 61 Olivera Cikoš)
Alina Dollheimer 671 4.0		0.0 560 Dijana Kormanjos
( (substituted on) 91 Sandra Sellner) Saskia Seitz 646 3.0		1.0 573 Vladana Obrenić

Alba Aréna, Székesfehérvár

=== Group B ===
		Pts	Matches			Team points		Set points		Qualification
Rank	Team	Pts	W	D	L	W	L	W	L	Qualification
1	Hungary (H)	6	3	0	0	21	3	49.5	22.5	Advance to quarterfinals
2	Romania	4	2	0	1	13	11	34	38	Advance to quarterfinals
3	France	2	1	0	2	10	14	30	42	
4	Poland	0	0	0	3	4	20	30.5	41.5	

29 May 2025
14:40 CEST

Hungary	8 – 0	France
3618 19.0	Report	5.0 3348
Boglárka Hari 599 4.0		0.0 570 Margot Gribelin
Gyöngyi Csongrádi 590 3.0		1.0 544 Lorène Zind
Enikő Németh 614 3.0		1.0 558 Emmanuelle Mall
Anita Sáfrány 646 4.0		0.0 535 Rachel Simon
Edit Sass 578 3.0		1.0 553 Aurélie Remy
( (substituted on) 61 Luca Kis Horváth) Anita Méhész 591 2.0		2.0 588 Amélie Zind

Alba Aréna, Székesfehérvár

29 May 2025
18:20 CEST

Romania	6 – 2	Poland
3437 13.5	Report	10.5 3384
Bernadett Seres 587 2.5		1.5 578 Julia Hurnowicz
Florentina Naghi 569 3.0		1.0 561 Sandra Szczepska
Alina Ştefania Sanda 544 1.0		3.0 568 Julia Brodziszewska
Maria Ciobanu 588 3.0		1.0 548 Anna Szymoniak ( (substituted on) 67 Katarzyna Nowakowska)
Daniela Lăcătuşu 561 2.0		2.0 540 Nicoletta Dudziak
Luminita Viorica Dogaru 588 2.0		2.0 589 Patrycja Sobieska

Alba Aréna, Székesfehérvár

31 May 2025
14:40 CEST

Hungary	7 – 1	Poland
3460 13.5	Report	10.5 3312
Boglárka Hari 621 3.5		0.5 590 Sandra Szczepska
Cintia Bálintfy 580 3.0		1.0 522 Julia Hurnowicz
Edit Sass 551 1.0		3.0 604 Katarzyna Nowakowska
Irén Nemes 579 2.0		2.0 551 Natalia Nowak
( (substituted on) 61 Enikő Németh) Júlia-Emese Airizer 540 2.0		2.0 499 Julia Brodziszewska ( (substituted on) 61 Nicoletta Dudziak)
Anita Mehész 589 2.0		2.0 546 Patrycja Sobieska

Alba Aréna, Székesfehérvár

31 May 2025
18:20 CEST

France	3 – 5	Romania
3376 10.5	Report	13.5 3441
Aurélie Remy 581 1.0		3.0 597 Bernadett Seres
Lilou Jardel 558 2.0		2.0 543 Florentina Naghi
Margot Gribelin 579 3.0		1.0 555 Maria Ciobanu
Rachel Simon 571 2.5		1.5 553 Daniela Lăcătușu
Amélie Zind 547 2.0		2.0 572 Réka Fekete
Emmanuelle Mall 540 0.0		4.0 621 Luminița Viorica Dogaru

Alba Aréna, Székesfehérvár

2 June 2025
11:00 CEST

Poland	1 – 7	France
3345 9.5	Report	14.5 3431
Julia Brodziszewska 568 2.0		2.0 582 Aurélie Remy
Sandra Szczepska 563 1.0		3.0 567 Lilou Jardel
( (substituted on) 61 Julia Hurnowicz) Natalia Nowak 531 1.0		3.0 578 Rachel Simon
Anna Szymoniak 549 1.0		3.0 555 Lorène Zind
Katarzyna Nowakowska 585 3.0		1.0 583 Margot Gribelin
Patrycja Sobieska 549 1.5		2.5 566 Amélie Zind

Alba Aréna, Székesfehérvár

2 June 2025
14:40 CEST

Romania	2 – 6	Hungary
3405 7.0	Report	17.0 3579
Daniela Lăcătușu 538 0.0		4.0 636 Boglárka Hari
Bernadett Seres 597 2.0		2.0 587 Gyöngyi Csongrádi
Maria Ciobanu 587 3.0		1.0 569 Enikő Németh
Alina Ștefania Sanda 569 0.0		4.0 601 Irén Nemes
Réka Fekete 563 1.0		3.0 590 Anita Méhész
Luminița Viorica Dogaru 551 1.0		3.0 596 Anita Sáfrány

Alba Aréna, Székesfehérvár

=== Group C ===
		Pts	Matches			Team points		Set points		Qualification
Rank	Team	Pts	W	D	L	W	L	W	L	Qualification
1	Croatia	5	2	1	0	20	4	52.5	19.5	Advance to quarterfinals
2	Slovenia	5	2	1	0	19	5	49.5	22.5	Advance to quarterfinals
3	North Macedonia	1	0	1	2	5	19	22	50	
4	Estonia	1	0	1	2	4	20	20	52	

29 May 2025
08:30 CEST

Croatia	8 – 0	North Macedonia
3643 21.0	Report	3.0 3239
Matea Juričić 571 4.0		0.0 509 Dragana Gavrilova
Venesa Bogdanović 568 4.0		0.0 507 Alena Avramovska
( (substituted on) 61 Anja Vicković) Klara Sedlar 620 3.0		1.0 555 Andrea Veljanoska
Valentina Gal 605 3.0		1.0 539 Stefanija Aleksovska
( (substituted on) 61 Paula Polanšćak) Amela Nicol Imširović 631 4.0		0.0 545 Biljana Gavrilova
Nataša Ravnić 648 3.0		1.0 584 Dance Naumovska

Alba Aréna, Székesfehérvár

29 May 2025
11:00 CEST

Slovenia	8 – 0	Estonia
3530 19.5	Report	4.5 3281
Tea Repnik 563 4.0		0.0 529 Kaire Kalberg
Sara Rovtar 611 4.0		0.0 542 Karin Vee
Brigitte Strelec 600 2.0		2.0 599 Heret Ots
Ana Oder 606 2.5		1.5 567 Marian Saar
( (substituted on) 61 Nataša Radić) Marija Ahačič Premrl 589 3.0		1.0 534 Triinu Saetalu
Anja Forštnarič 561 4.0		0.0 510 Kertu Rohumägi

Alba Aréna, Székesfehérvár

31 May 2025
14:40 CEST

Estonia	0 – 8	Croatia
3238 5.0	Report	19.0 3568
Kaidi Kirs 546 1.0		3.0 580 Ana Bacan-Schneider
Henriette Järv 508 0.0		4.0 600 Amela Nicol Imširović ( (substituted on) 61 Klara Sedlar)
Heret Ots 564 1.0		3.0 587 Venesa Bogdanović
Mariann Saar 561 2.0		2.0 567 Anja Vicković
Kaire Kalberg 539 1.0		3.0 610 Sara Pejak ( (substituted on) 61 Paula Polanščak)
Kertu Rohumägi 520 0.0		4.0 624 Matea Juričić

Alba Aréna, Székesfehérvár

31 May 2025
18:20 CEST

Slovenia	7 – 1	North Macedonia
3490 18.5	Report	5.5 3320
Tea Repnik 619 3.5		0.5 543 Mirjana Mladenovska
Tina Mrzljak 565 4.0		0.0 525 Dragana Gavrilova
Marija Ahačič Premrl 579 4.0		0.0 514 Milena Petreski
Nataša Radić 595 3.0		1.0 574 Andrea Veljanoska
( (substituted on) 61 Ana Oder) Anja Forštnarič 590 4.0		0.0 540 Biljana Gavrilova ( (substituted on) 61 Dance Naumovska)
( (substituted on) 61 Sara Rovtar) Brigitte Strelec 542 0.0		4.0 624 Stefanija Aleksovska

Alba Aréna, Székesfehérvár

2 June 2025
08:30 CEST

North Macedonia	4 – 4	Estonia
3319 13.5	Report	10.5 3227
Dragana Gavrilova 581 3.5		0.5 499 Marian Saar
Stefanija Aleksovska 518 1.0		3.0 571 Heret Ots
Mirjana Mladenovska 553 2.0		2.0 561 Karin Vee
Biljana Gavrilova 586 4.0		0.0 487 Triinu Saetalu ( (substituted on) 61 Kaire Kalberg)
Andrea Veljanoska 517 1.0		3.0 535 Kaidi Kirs
Dance Naumovska 564 2.0		2.0 574 Henriette Järv

Alba Aréna, Székesfehérvár

2 June 2025
14:40 CEST

Croatia	4 – 4	Slovenia
3623 12.5	Report	11.5 3638
Amela Nicol Imširović 618 2.0		2.0 602 Brigitte Strelec
Matea Juričić 605 1.0		3.0 618 Tea Repnik
Venesa Bogdanović 578 0.0		4.0 640 Marija Ahačič Premrl
Valentina Gal 583 2.5		1.5 583 Nataša Radić
Paula Polanščak 620 3.0		1.0 592 Anja Forštnarič
Nataša Ravnić 619 4.0		0.0 603 Ana Oder

Alba Aréna, Székesfehérvár

=== Group D ===
		Pts	Matches			Team points		Set points		Qualification
Rank	Team	Pts	W	D	L	W	L	W	L	Qualification
1	Czechia	4	2	0	0	15	1	31.5	16.5	Advance to quarterfinals
2	Austria	2	1	0	1	9	7	31	17	Advance to quarterfinals
3	Italy	0	0	0	2	0	16	9.5	38.5	

29 May 2025
11:00 CEST

Czechia	8 – 0	Italy
3581 18.0	Report	6.0 3303
Renáta Babická 558 2.0		2.0 552 Adele Ainhauser
Jana Braunová 638 3.0		1.0 586 Christine Innerhofer
Natálie Bínová 619 3.0		1.0 583 Vera Rabanser
Zuzana Honcová 597 4.0		0.0 523 Doris Libardi ( (substituted on) 61 Annemarie Innerhofer)
Alena Kantnerová 578 4.0		0.0 537 Edith Pfattner
( (substituted on) 61 Anna Štraufová) Barbora Pýchová 591 2.0		2.0 522 Dora Rinner ( (substituted on) 61 Silvia Gaiser)

Alba Aréna, Székesfehérvár

31 May 2025
11:00 CEST

Italy	0 – 8	Austria
3281 3.5	Report	20.5 3420
Adele Ainhauser 528 0.5		3.5 550 Jennifer Kozak
Christine Innerhofer 557 0.5		3.5 576 Julia Huber
Silvia Gaiser 552 0.0		4.0 616 Fiona Steiner
Vera Rabanser 570 1.0		3.0 590 Monika Nguyen
Doris Libardi 539 1.0		3.0 532 Nicole Plamenig ( (substituted on) 61 Martina Vegerbauer)
( (substituted on) 91 Annemarie Innerhofer) Edith Pfattner 535 0.5		3.5 556 Lisa Vsetecka ( (substituted on) 61 Jessica Ebner)

Alba Aréna, Székesfehérvár

2 June 2025
18:20 CEST

Austria	1 – 7	Czechia
3489 10.5	Report	13.5 3566
Lisa Vsetecka 597 2.0		2.0 604 Nikola Kunová
Jennifer Kozak 571 2.0		2.0 582 Zuzana Honcová
Fiona Steiner 617 2.0		2.0 636 Natálie Binová
Julia Huber 602 2.0		2.0 610 Barbora Pýchová
Monika Nguyen 542 0.0		4.0 589 Jana Braunová
Jessica Ebner 560 2.5		1.5 545 Anna Štraufová ( (substituted on) 91 Renata Babická)

Alba Aréna, Székesfehérvár

== Final Round ==
=== Bracket ===
Quarterfinals
A1	Germany	5
C2	Slovenia	3
B1	Hungary	6
D2	Austria	2
C1	Croatia	7
A2	Serbia	1
D1	Czechia	7
B2	Romania	1

Semifinals
Germany	6
Hungary	2
Croatia	7
Czechia	1

Final
Germany	2
Croatia	6

=== Quarterfinals ===
4 June 2025
10:00 CEST

Germany	5 – 3	Slovenia
3606 14.0	Report	10.0 3542
Alina Dollheimer 570 1.0		3.0 565 Nataša Radić
Celine Zenker 600 4.0		0.0 553 Marija Ahačič Premrl ( (substituted on) 61 Tina Mrzljak)
Bianca Golla 618 2.0		2.0 638 Tea Repnik
Sarah Conrad 630 3.0		1.0 587 Ana Oder
Sandra Sellner 564 1.0		3.0 615 Anja Forštnarič
Saskia Seitz 624 3.0		1.0 584 Brigitte Strelec ( (substituted on) 91 Sara Rovtar)

Alba Aréna, Székesfehérvár

4 June 2025
12:30 CEST

Czechia	7 – 1	Romania
3633 16.0	Report	8.0 3358
Nikola Kunová 572 2.0		2.0 568 Alina Ștefania Sanda
Jana Braunová 617 3.0		1.0 538 Bernadett Seres
Zuzana Honcová 656 4.0		0.0 499 Florentina Naghi
( (substituted on) 101 Renata Babická) Anna Štraufová 598 4.0		0.0 539 Réka Fekete
( (substituted on) 64 Barbora Pýchová) Natalie Bínová 632 3.0		1.0 586 Maria Ciobanu
Alena Kantnerová 558 0.0		4.0 628 Luminița Viorica Dogaru

Alba Aréna, Székesfehérvár

4 June 2025
15:00 CEST

Croatia	7 – 1	Serbia
3601 17.0	Report	7.0 3496
Amela Nicol Imširović 605 4.0		0.0 544 Kristina Trošić
Ana Bacan-Schneider 568 1.0		3.0 617 Jasmina Rašković
Matea Juričić 615 2.0		2.0 603 Vladana Obrenić
Klara Sedlar 595 4.0		0.0 541 Nada Komanov ( (substituted on) 61 Olivera Cikoš)
( (substituted on) 91 Sara Pejak) Nataša Ravnić 632 4.0		0.0 611 Dijana Kormanjos
( (substituted on) 91 Anja Vicković) Paula Polanščak 586 2.0		2.0 580 Ljiljana Frenc

Alba Aréna, Székesfehérvár

4 June 2025
17:30 CEST

Hungary	6 – 2	Austria
3557 13.0	Report	11.0 3516
Boglárka Hari 571 1.0		3.0 592 Martina Vegerbauer
Irén Nemes 565 0.0		4.0 632 Lisa Vsetecka
Gyöngyi Csongrádi 573 3.0		1.0 554 Julia Huber
Edit Sass 613 3.0		1.0 594 Fiona Steiner
Anita Sáfrány 596 2.0		2.0 584 Nicole Plamenig
Anita Méhész 639 4.0		0.0 560 Jennifer Kozak ( (substituted on) 31 Jessica Ebner)

Alba Aréna, Székesfehérvár

=== Semifinals ===
6 June 2025
10:00 CEST

Croatia	7 – 1	Czechia
3724 14.5	Report	9.5 3580
Amela Nicol Imsirović 611 0.5		3.5 633 Jana Braunová
Klara Sedlar 617 2.0		2.0 615 Nikola Kunová
Matea Juričić 637 3.0		1.0 586 Zuzana Honcová
( (substituted on) 91 Venesa Bogdanović) Paula Polanščak 652 3.0		1.0 608 Natálie Bínová
Valentina Gal 598 3.0		1.0 572 Renata Babická
Nataša Ravnić 609 3.0		1.0 566 Barbora Pýchová ( (substituted on) 31 Alena Kantnerová)

Alba Aréna, Székesfehérvár

6 June 2025
12:30 CEST

Germany	6 – 2	Hungary
3625 13.5	Report	10.5 3561
( (substituted on) 61 Sandra Sellner) Luisa Ebert 578 1.0		3.0 635 Boglárka Hari
Bianca Golla 623 3.5		0.5 585 Anita Sáfrány
Celine Zenker 594 2.0		2.0 593 Gyöngyi Csongrádi
Sarah Conrad 581 1.0		3.0 599 Edit Sass
Saskia Seitz 627 4.0		0.0 568 Irén Nemes
Alina Dollheimer 622 2.0		2.0 581 Anita Méhész

Alba Aréna, Székesfehérvár

=== Final ===
7 June 2025
10:30 CEST

Germany	2 – 6	Croatia
3579 12.5	Report	11.5 3642
Sarah Conrad 572 2.0		2.0 599 Amela Nicol Imširović
Bianca Golla 603 1.0		3.0 619 Klara Sedlar
Celine Zenker 603 3.0		1.0 598 Matea Juričić
Sandra Sellner 587 2.0		2.0 616 Paula Polanščak
Saskia Seitz 589 2.5		1.5 575 Venesa Bogdanović
Alina Dollheimer 625 2.0		2.0 635 Nataša Ravnić

Alba Aréna, Székesfehérvár

== Final standing ==
Rank	Team
1st place, gold medalist(s)	Croatia
2nd place, silver medalist(s)	Germany
3rd place, bronze medalist(s)	Czechia
3rd place, bronze medalist(s)	Hungary
5-8	Austria
5-8	Romania
5-8	Serbia
5-8	Slovenia
9-12	France
9-12	Italy
9-12	North Macedonia
9-12	Slovakia
13-15	Denmark
13-15	Estonia
13-15	Poland

2025 Women's World Championesses

Croatia
4th title

Team roster: Ana Bacan-Schneider, Venesa Bogdanović, Valentina Gal, Amela Nicol Imširović, Matea Juričić, Sara Pejak, Paula Polanšćak, Nataša Ravnić, Klara Sedlar, Anja Vicković
Head coach: Darinka Bunić
