= 2023 World Team Ninepin Bowling Classic Championships – Women's tournament =

Tournament details
- Host country: Croatia
- City: Varaždin
- Venue: 1 (in 1 host city)
- Dates: 19-28 May
- Teams: 17

Final positions
- Champions: Croatia (3rd title)
- Runners-up: Austria
- Third place: Germany; Romania

Tournament statistics
- Matches played: 31
- Top scorers: Player: Edit Sass 658; Team: Hungary 3712

The women's tournament at the 2023 World Team Ninepin Bowling Classic Championships was held in Varaždin, Croatia, from 19 to 28 May 2023.

== Participating teams ==
16 associations applied to participate in the women's teams competition.

- Austria
- Bosnia and Herzegovina
- Croatia
- Czechia
- Estonia
- France
- Germany
- Hungary
- North Macedonia
- Poland
- Romania
- Serbia
- Slovakia
- Slovenia

=== Draw ===
Groups were drawn on October 30, 2022, during the conference in Rosice.

Pot 1	Pot 2	Pot 3	Pot 4
Croatia (hosts); Czechia; Germany; Serbia	Austria; Hungary; Romania; Slovenia	Bosnia and Herzegovina; France; Poland; Slovakia	Denmark; Estonia; Italy; North Macedonia

=== Groups ===
Group A	Group B	Group C	Group D
Czechia; Slovenia; Poland; Estonia	Germany; Austria; France; North Macedonia	Croatia (hosts); Romania; Bosnia and Herzegovina; Italy	Serbia; Hungary; Slovakia; Denmark

== Group stage ==
=== Group A ===
		Pts	Matches			Team points		Set points		Qualification
Rank	Team	Pts	W	D	L	W	L	W	L	Qualification
1	Slovenia	6	3	0	0	21	3	55	17	Advance to quarterfinals
2	Czechia	4	2	0	1	16	8	44.5	27.5	Advance to quarterfinals
3	Estonia	2	1	0	2	8	16	26.5	45.5	
4	Poland	0	0	0	3	3	21	18	54	

19 May 2023
08:00 CEST

Czechia	7 - 1	Estonia
3463 16.5	Report	7.5 3276
Jana Braunová 585 3.0		1.0 559 Karin Vee
( (substituted on) 61 Simona Koutníková) Vlasta Kohoutová 542 2.0		2.0 540 Heret Ots
Dana Martinkevič 620 3.0		1.0 561 Marian Saar
Natálie Topičová 582 4.0		0.0 555 Triinu Saetalu
( (substituted on) 61 Anna Štraufová) Nikola Portyšová 542 1.5		2.5 547 Gertrud Orrin
Aneta Cvejnová 592 3.0		1.0 514 Kaidi Kirs

Varaždin Arena, Varaždin

19 May 2023
19:00 CEST

Slovenia	7 - 1	Poland
3517 19.0	Report	5.0 3298
Maja Plavčak 582 2.0		2.0 601 Patrycja Sobieska
Tina Mrzljak 588 4.0		0.0 561 Aleksandra Bonk
Marija Ahačič Premrl 640 3.0		1.0 521 Weronika Torka ( (substituted on) 61 Anna Chwastyniak)
Tea Repnik 592 4.0		0.0 542 Natalia Włodarczyk
Eva Sajko 554 1.0		1.0 536 Julia Sidło
Nataša Radić 561 3.0		1.0 537 Nicoletta Dudziak

Varaždin Arena, Varaždin

21 May 2023
11:40 CEST

Slovenia	7 - 1	Estonia
3498 18.0	Report	6.0 3224
Irena Mejač 616 3.0		1.0 552 Kaidi Kirs
Marija Ahačič Premrl 544 4.0		0.0 516 Marian Saar
Eva Sajko 574 3.0		1.0 562 Heret Ots
Sara Rovtar 618 4.0		0.0 501 Gertrud Orrin ( (substituted on) 91 Triinu Saetalu)
Nataša Radić 594 2.0		2.0 535 Marge Kraav
Tea Repnik 552 2.0		2.0 558 Karin Abel

Varaždin Arena, Varaždin

21 May 2023
19:00 CEST

Poland	0 - 8	Czechia
3204 2.0	Report	22.0 3517
Natalia Włodarczyk 533 0.5		3.5 583 Simona Koutníková
Julia Sidło 536 0.5		3.5 596 Dana Martinkevič
Nicoletta Dudziak 516 0.0		4.0 572 Nikola Portyšová
Anna Chwastyniak 533 0.0		4.0 583 Natálie Topičová
Aleksandra Bonk 553 1.0		3.0 612 Aneta Cvejnová
Patrycja Sobieska 533 0.0		4.0 571 Jana Braunová

Varaždin Arena, Varaždin

23 May 2023
11:40 CEST

Estonia	6 - 2	Poland
3372 13.0	Report	11.0 3300
Karin Vee 580 4.0		0.0 531 Weronika Torka
Marge Kraev 557 2.0		2.0 547 Aleksandra Bonk
Heret Ots 603 4.0		0.0 520 Natalia Włodarczyk
Triinu Saetalu 540 0.0		4.0 599 Anna Chwastyniak
Karin Abel 534 1.0		3.0 553 Nicoletta Dudziak
Marian Saar 558 2.0		2.0 550 Patrycja Sobieska

Varaždin Arena, Varaždin

23 May 2023
19:00 CEST

Czechia	1 - 7	Slovenia
3401 6.0	Report	18.0 3557
Simona Koutníková 557 0.5		3.5 580 Tina Mrzljak
Dana Martinkevič 584 2.0		2.0 580 Irena Mejač ( (substituted on) 48 Sara Rovtar)
Nikola Portyšová 570 1.0		3.0 586 Maja Plavčak
Natálie Topičová 582 1.5		2.5 608 Marija Ahačič Premrl
( (substituted on) 91 Vlasta Kohoutová) Aneta Cvejnová 542 0.0		4.0 599 Eva Sajko
( (substituted on) 91 Anna Štraufová) Jana Braunová 566 1.0		3.0 604 Nataša Radić

Varaždin Arena, Varaždin

=== Group B ===
		Pts	Matches			Team points		Set points		Qualification
Rank	Team	Pts	W	D	L	W	L	W	L	Qualification
1	Austria	6	3	0	0	18	6	46	26	Advance to quarterfinals
2	Germany	4	2	0	1	19	5	51.5	20.5	Advance to quarterfinals
3	France	2	1	0	2	10	14	30.5	41.5	
4	North Macedonia	0	0	0	3	1	23	16	56	

19 May 2023
11:40 CEST

Germany	8 - 0	North Macedonia
3508 18.0	Report	6.0 3188
Alina Dollheimer 604 3.0		1.0 551 Dragana Gavrilova
Celine Zenker 618 3.0		1.0 564 Mihaela Ristevska
Alena Bimber 593 4.0		0.0 528 Biljana Gavrilova
Luisa Ebert 546 3.0		1.0 486 Elena Avramovska
Sandra Sellner 549 2.0		2.0 538 Dance Naumovska
( (substituted on) 61 Jana-Sophie Bachert) Anna Müller 598 3.0		1.0 521 Andrea Veljanoska

Varaždin Arena, Varaždin

19 May 2023
15:20 CEST

Austria	6 - 2	France
3384 13.0	Report	11.0 3273
Dominique Rathmayer 542 1.0		3.0 554 Rachel Simon
( (substituted on) 61 Monika Lengauer) Lisa Vsetecka 509 0.0		4.0 574 Aurélie Remy
Monika Nguyen 558 2.0		1.0 539 Mathilde Chapotot
Julia Huber 603 4.0		0.0 540 Amélie Zind
Fiona Steiner 622 3.0		1.0 535 Chalonne Simon
Nicole Plamenig 550 3.0		1.0 531 Margot Gribelin

Varaždin Arena, Varaždin

21 May 2023
08:00 CEST

Austria	7 - 1	North Macedonia
3437 19.5	Report	4.5 3160
Jennifer Kozak 617 4.0		0.0 480 Dragana Gavrilova ( (substituted on) 86 Mirjana Mladenovska)
Julia Huber 590 4.0		0.0 527 Mihaela Ristevska
( (substituted on) 61 Lisa Vsetecka) Monika Nguyen 548 4.0		0.0 528 Biljana Gavrilova
Dominique Rathmayer 558 4.0		0.0 500 Emilija Pereska
Fiona Steiner 572 2.0		2.0 569 Dance Naumovska
( (substituted on) 61 Nicole Plamenig) Monika Lengauer 552 1.5		2.5 556 Andrea Veljanoska

Varaždin Arena, Varaždin

21 May 2023
15:20 CEST

France	0 - 8	Germany
3186 1.0	Report	23.0 3690
Aurélie Remy 539 1.0		3.0 611 Alina Dollheimer
Rachel Simon 508 0.0		4.0 629 Celine Zenker
Mathilde Chapotot 551 0.0		4.0 630 Alena Bimber
Clarisse Huot 508 0.0		4.0 587 Luisa Ebert
( (substituted on) 61 Margot Gribelin) Chalonne Simon 538 0.0		4.0 631 Jana-Sophie Bachert
Amélie Zind 542 0.0		4.0 602 Saskia Seitz ( (substituted on) 91 Sandra Sellner)

Varaždin Arena, Varaždin

23 May 2023
11:40 CEST

North Macedonia	0 - 8	France
3072 5.5	Report	18.5 3387
Dance Naumovska 547 2.0		2.0 578 Aurélie Remy
( (substituted on) 91 Mirjana Mladenovska) Mihaela Ristevska 488 1.0		3.0 576 Margot Gribelin
Biljana Gavrilova 518 0.5		3.5 557 Mathilde Chapotot
( (substituted on) 61 Elena Avramovska) Emilija Pereska 454 0.0		4.0 542 Rachel Simon
Dragana Gavrilova 550 1.0		3.0 580 Amélie Zind
Andrea Veljanoska 515 1.0		3.0 554 Chalonne Simon

Varaždin Arena, Varaždin

23 May 2023
15:20 CEST

Germany	3 - 5	Austria
3498 10.5	Report	13.5 3561
Alina Dollheimer 612 2.0		2.0 594 Jennifer Kozak
Celine Zenker 569 1.5		2.5 583 Julia Huber
Alena Bimber 595 3.0		1.0 599 Fiona Steiner
Jana-Sophie Bachert 554 1.0		1.0 573 Nicole Plamenig ( (substituted on) 42 Lisa Vsetecka)
Anna Müller 562 1.0		3.0 619 Monika Nguyen
Saskia Seitz 606 2.0		2.0 593 Dominique Rathmayer

Varaždin Arena, Varaždin

=== Group C ===
		Pts	Matches			Team points		Set points		Qualification
Rank	Team	Pts	W	D	L	W	L	W	L	Qualification
1	Croatia (H)	6	3	0	0	21	3	56.5	15.5	Advance to quarterfinals
2	Romania	4	2	0	1	12	12	37	35	Advance to quarterfinals
3	Italy	1	0	1	2	8	16	24.5	47.5	
4	Bosnia and Herzegovina	1	0	1	2	7	17	26	46	

19 May 2023
11:40 CEST

Romania	6 - 2	Bosnia and Herzegovina
3359 16.0	Report	8.0 3270
Alina Ştefania Sanda 547 4.0		0.0 460 Minela Češko ( (substituted on) 61 Mehdina Huseinović, (substituted on) 91 Ana Rapo)
Florentina Naghi 551 1.0		3.0 606 Maja Kovačević
Bernadett Seres 534 2.0		2.0 543 Edina Kovačević
Maria Ciobanu 562 2.0		2.0 550 Renata Kozlina
Daniela Lăcătuşu 581 4.0		0.0 526 Tatjana Zlojutro
Luminita Viorica Dogaru 584 3.0		1.0 585 Sanja Majhen

Varaždin Arena, Varaždin

19 May 2023
15:20 CEST

Croatia	7 - 1	Italy
3566 18.0	Report	6.0 3307
Matea Juričić 587 3.0		1.0 557 Dagmar Wiedenhofer
Ana Bacan-Schneider 611 3.0		1.0 579 Vera Rabanser
Venesa Bogdanović 573 1.0		3.0 597 Laura Runggatscher
Klara Sedlar 579 3.0		1.0 545 Petra Unterhauser
Amela Nicol Imširović 629 4.0		0.0 496 Enikö Tot ( (substituted on) 31 Alina Platter, (substituted on) 91 Greta Trojer)
( (substituted on) 61 Nataša Ravnić) Valentina Gal 587 4.0		0.0 533 Annemarie Innerhofer

Varaždin Arena, Varaždin

21 May 2023
08:00 CEST

Romania	5 - 3	Italy
3411 15.0	Report	9.0 3365
Alina Ştefania Sanda 589 2.0		2.0 619 Laura Runggatscher
Florentina Naghi 566 1.0		3.0 592 Dagmar Wiedenhofer
Maria Ciobanu 598 3.0		1.0 573 Vera Rabanser
Réka Fekete 545 2.0		2.0 559 Greta Trojer
Daniela Lăcătuşu 519 3.0		1.0 527 Annemarie Innerhofer ( (substituted on) 86 Enikö Tot)
Luminita Viorica Dogaru 594 4.0		0.0 495 Petra Unterhauser ( (substituted on) 55 Alina Platter)

Varaždin Arena, Varaždin

21 May 2023
15:20 CEST

Bosnia and Herzegovina	1 - 7	Croatia
3278 3.5	Report	20.5 3577
Tatjana Zlojutro 540 1.5		2.5 574 Paula Polanšćak ( (substituted on) 61 Sara Pejak)
Renata Kozlina 541 0.0		4.0 620 Valentina Gal
Ana Rapo 513 0.0		4.0 623 Matea Juričić
Maja Kovačević 589 2.0		2.0 587 Venesa Bogdanović ( (substituted on) 61 Klara Sedlar)
Sanja Majhen 549 0.0		4.0 579 Milana Pavlić
Minela Češko 546 0.0		4.0 594 Nataša Ravnić

Varaždin Arena, Varaždin

23 May 2023
08:00 CEST

Italy	4 - 4	Bosnia and Herzegovina
3301 9.5	Report	14.5 3277
Dagmar Wiedenhofer 571 3.5		0.5 509 Edina Kovačević ( (substituted on) 61 Mehdina Huseinović)
Petra Unterhauser 520 0.0		4.0 572 Maja Kovačević
Vera Rabanser 553 1.0		3.0 541 Tatjana Zlojutro
Greta Trojer 540 1.0		3.0 543 Renata Kozlina
Laura Runggatscher 615 4.0		0.0 562 Minela Češko
( (substituted on) 61 Alina Platter, (substituted on) 91 Annemarie Innerhofer) Enikö Tot 502 0.0		4.0 550 Sanja Majhen

Varaždin Arena, Varaždin

23 May 2023
15:20 CEST

Croatia	7 - 1	Romania
3642 18.0	Report	6.0 3360
Amela Nicol Imširović 629 4.0		0.0 554 Alina Ştefania Sanda
Ana Bacan-Schneider 632 4.0		0.0 525 Daniela Lăcătuşu ( (substituted on) 61 Bernadett Seres)
( (substituted on) 61 Sara Pejak) Klara Sedlar 580 3.0		1.0 538 Florentina Naghi
( (substituted on) 61 Paula Polanšćak) Milana Pavlić 556 2.0		2.0 588 Maria Ciobanu
Matea Juričić 621 3.0		1.0 568 Réka Fekete
Nataša Ravnić 624 2.0		2.0 587 Luminita Viorica Dogaru ( (substituted on) 61 Andreea Mioara Drăghici)

Varaždin Arena, Varaždin

=== Group D ===
		Pts	Matches			Team points		Set points		Qualification
Rank	Team	Pts	W	D	L	W	L	W	L	Qualification
1	Hungary	6	3	0	0	22	2	58	14	Advance to quarterfinals
2	Serbia	4	2	0	1	15	9	40	32	Advance to quarterfinals
3	Slovakia	2	1	0	2	11	13	39.5	32.5	
4	Denmark	0	0	0	3	0	24	6.5	65.5	

19 May 2023
08:00 CEST

Serbia	8 - 0	Denmark
3421 22.0	Report	2.0 2886
Vladana Obrenić 583 4.0		0.0 432 Anni Johnna Malm ( (substituted on) 86 Lindy Janie Andersen)
Jelena Santo 566 3.0		1.0 524 Helene Holst Jensen
Olivera Čikoš 598 4.0		0.0 508 Lea Katrine Mikkelsen
Dijana Kormanjos 532 4.0		0.0 457 Louise Irene Jørgensen
( (substituted on) 61 Hermina Lukač) Jasmina Rašković 589 4.0		0.0 468 Linda Holst Bille
( (substituted on) 61 Ljiljana Frenc) Kristina Ljubenković 553 3.0		1.0 497 Ena Emma Bargholz

Varaždin Arena, Varaždin

19 May 2023
19:00 CEST

Hungary	7 - 1	Slovakia
3604 19.0	Report	5.0 3347
Irén Nemes 617 4.0		0.0 562 Alexandra Duračková
Boglárka Hari 609 4.0		0.0 541 Vladimíra Vávrová
Katalin Tóth 591 3.0		1.0 571 Natália Šintálová
Edit Sass 557 2.0		2.0 572 Katarína Valigurová
Anita Sáfrány 620 3.0		1.0 543 Jana Poliaková
Anita Méhész 610 3.0		1.0 558 Naďa Poliaková

Varaždin Arena, Varaždin

21 May 2023
11:40 CEST

Hungary	8 - 0	Denmark
3458 21.0	Report	3.0 2987
Irén Nemes 584 3.0		1.0 527 Linda Holst Bille
Gyöngyi Csongrádi 554 3.0		1.0 498 Helene Holst Jensen
Dorottya Szalai-Bordács 573 3.0		1.0 537 Ena Emma Bargholz
Edit Sass 594 4.0		0.0 489 Lea Katrine Mikkelsen
Katalin Tóth 561 4.0		0.0 507 Louise Irene Jørgensen
Julia-Emese Airizer 592 4.0		0.0 429 Lindy Janie Andersen

Varaždin Arena, Varaždin

21 May 2023
19:00 CEST

Slovakia	2 - 6	Serbia
3426 12.0	Report	12.0 3450
Natália Šintálová 571 4.0		0.0 523 Vladana Obrenić ( (substituted on) 91 Jelena Santo)
Katarina Valigurová 567 1.0		3.0 587 Kristina Ljubenković
Jana Poliaková 574 1.0		3.0 587 Olivera Čikoš
Naďa Poliaková 581 1.0		3.0 588 Ljiljana Frenc
( (substituted on) 61 Daniela Mócová) Alexandra Duračková 558 2.0		2.0 591 Jasmina Rašković
Vladimíra Vávrová 575 3.0		1.0 574 Hermina Lukač

Varaždin Arena, Varaždin

23 May 2023
08:00 CEST

Denmark	0 - 8	Slovakia
2936 1.5	Report	22.5 3310
Anni Johnna Malm 494 1.0		3.0 535 Natália Šintálová
Linda Holst Bille 499 0.0		4.0 582 Daniela Mócová
Helene Holst Jensen 465 0.0		4.0 507 Alexandra Duračková
Louise Irene Jørgensen 445 0.0		4.0 578 Vladimíra Vávrová
( (substituted on) 97 Lindy Janie Andersen) Lea Katrine Mikkelsen 493 0.0		4.0 561 Dominika Laurov
Ena Emma Bargholz 540 0.5		3.5 547 Jana Poliaková

Varaždin Arena, Varaždin

23 May 2023
19:00 CEST

Serbia	1 - 7	Hungary
3426 6.0	Report	18.0 3712
Jasmina Rašković 589 2.0		2.0 582 Irén Nemes
( (substituted on) 61 Višnja Živanović) Kristina Ljubenković 546 0.0		4.0 636 Boglárka Hari
Dijana Kormanjos 551 1.0		3.0 594 Anita Méhész
Hermina Lukač 612 2.0		2.0 658 Edit Sass
Olivera Čikoš 577 1.0		3.0 620 Anita Sáfrány ( (substituted on) 61 Katalin Tóth)
Brigitta Zolnai Liljana Frenc 551 0.0		4.0 622 Julia-Emese Airizer

Varaždin Arena, Varaždin

== Final Round ==
=== Bracket ===
Quarterfinals
A1	Slovenia	4	11
C2	Romania	4	13
B1	Austria	5
D2	Serbia	3
C1	Croatia	6
A2	Czechia	2
D1	Hungary	2
B2	Germany	6

Semifinals
Romania	1
Austria	7
Croatia	5
Germany	3

Final
Austria	1
Croatia	7

=== Quarterfinals ===
25 May 2023
10:00 CEST

Slovenia	4 - 4	Romania
3397 11.0	Report	13.0 3375
Tina Mrzljak 539 1.0		3.0 553 Alina Ştefania Sanda
Sara Rovtar 592 3.0		1.0 566 Maria Ciobanu
Nataša Radić 543 3.0		1.0 510 Florentina Naghi ( (substituted on) 43 Andreea Mioara Drăghici)
Maja Plavčak 553 2.0		2.0 556 Réka Fekete
Eva Sajko 579 1.0		3.0 563 Daniela Lăcătuşu
Marija Ahačič Preml 591 1.0		3.0 627 Luminita Viorica Dogaru

Varaždin Arena, Varaždin

25 May 2023
12:30 CEST

Austria	5 - 3	Serbia
3452 15.0	Report	9.0 3365
Julia Huber 604 3.0		1.0 570 Kristina Ljubenković
Jennifer Kozak 575 2.0		2.0 593 Jasmina Rašković
Fiona Steiner 567 2.0		2.0 575 Vladana Obrenić
( (substituted on) 27 Lisa Vsetecka) Nicole Plamenig 577 3.0		1.0 528 Olivera Čikoš
Monika Nguyen 567 2.0		2.0 569 Hermina Lukač
Dominique Rathmayer 562 3.0		1.0 530 Liljana Frenc

Varaždin Arena, Varaždin

25 May 2023
15:00 CEST

Croatia	6 - 2	Czechia
3688 15.5	Report	8.5 3569
Amela Nicol Imširović 643 3.5		0.5 604 Dana Martinkevič
Ana Bacan-Schneider 605 2.0		2.0 610 Jana Braunová
Valentina Gal 600 2.0		2.0 584 Anna Štraufová
Matea Juričić 620 3.0		1.0 572 Nikola Portyšová
Venesa Bogdanović 610 2.0		2.0 616 Natálie Topičová
Nataša Ravnić 610 3.0		1.0 583 Aneta Cvejnová

Varaždin Arena, Varaždin

25 May 2023
17:30 CEST

Hungary	2 - 6	Germany
3590 10.0	Report	14.0 3643
Boglárka Hari 624 2.0		2.0 600 Celine Zenker
Irén Nemes 592 2.0		2.0 600 Jana-Sophie Bachert
Edit Sass 609 1.0		3.0 605 Anna Müller
Anita Sáfrány 575 2.0		2.0 587 Alina Dollheimer
Anita Méhész 608 3.0		3.0 615 Saskia Seitz
Katalin Tóth 582 0.0		4.0 636 Alena Bimber

Varaždin Arena, Varaždin

=== Semifinals ===
27 May 2023
09:25 CEST

Romania	1 - 7	Austria
3363 8.5	Report	15.5 3552
( (substituted on) 31 Florentina Naghi) Alina Ştefania Sanda 527 0.5		3.5 600 Jennifer Kozak
Andrea Mioara Drăghici 550 0.0		4.0 626 Julia Huber
Maria Ciobanu 592 1.0		3.0 595 Dominique Rathmayer
Réka Fekete 570 1.0		3.0 621 Fiona Steiner
Daniela Lăcătuşu 576 4.0		0.0 533 Lisa Vsetecka
( (substituted on) 43 Bernadett Seres) Luminita Viorica Dogaru 548 2.0		2.0 577 Monika Nguyen

Varaždin Arena, Varaždin

27 May 2023
11:55 CEST

Croatia	5 - 3	Germany
3676 16.5	Report	7.5 3594
Valentina Gal 603 4.0		0.0 533 Anna Müller
Matea Juričić 652 4.0		0.0 594 Jana-Sophie Bachert
Ana Bacan-Schneider 579 2.0		2.0 607 Celine Zenker
( (substituted on) 116 Paula Polanšćak) Nataša Ravnić 601 1.0		3.0 643 Alina Dollheimer
Venesa Bogdanović 625 4.0		0.0 588 Saskia Seitz ( (substituted on) 91 Sandra Sellner)
( (substituted on) 116 Sara Pejak) Amela Nicol Imširović 616 1.5		2.5 629 Alena Bimber

Varaždin Arena, Varaždin

=== Final ===
28 May 2023
11:00 CEST

Austria	1 - 7	Croatia
3448 5.0	Report	19.0 3662
Julia Huber 617 1.0		3.0 628 Valentina Gal
Jennifer Kozak 527 0.0		4.0 647 Matea Juričić
Dominique Rathmayer 580 0.0		4.0 630 Nataša Ravnić
( (substituted on) 91 Monika Lengauer) Fiona Steiner 581 1.0		3.0 607 Amela Nicol Imširović
Lisa Vsetecka 550 1.0		3.0 567 Ana Bacan-Schneider ( (substituted on) 61, Klara Sedlar (substituted on) 91 Milana Pavlić)
Monika Nguyen 593 2.0		2.0 583 Venesa Bogdanović

Varaždin Arena, Varaždin

== Final standing ==
Rank	Team
1st place, gold medalist(s)	Croatia
2nd place, silver medalist(s)	Austria
3rd place, bronze medalist(s)	Germany
3rd place, bronze medalist(s)	Romania
5-8	Czechia
5-8	Hungary
5-8	Serbia
5-8	Slovenia
9-12	Estonia
9-12	France
9-12	Italy
9-12	Slovakia
13-16	Bosnia and Herzegovina
13-16	Denmark
13-16	North Macedonia
13-16	Poland

2023 Women's World Champions

Croatia
3rd title

Team roster: Ana Bacan-Schneider, Venesa Bogdanović, Valentina Gal, Amela Nicol Imširović, Matea Juričić, Milana Pavlić, Sara Pejak, Paula Polanšćak, Nataša Ravnić, Klara Sedlar
Head coach: Darinka Bunić
