= WNBA (disambiguation) =

The WNBA is the Women's National Basketball Association, a women's professional basketball league in North America.

WNBA may also refer to:

- World Ninepin Bowling Association
- Women's National Book Association
- Woman's National Bowling Association, now Women's International Bowling Congress
- "WNBA", a song by Drake from his 2026 album Habibti
