= 2026 World Singles Ninepin Bowling Classic Championships – Women's pair =

Women's pair at the 2026 World Singles Ninepin Bowling Classic Championships
- Location: Schwaz, Austria
- Dates: 31 May 2026
- Competitors: 64 from 16 nations
- Teams: 32
- Winning score: 1329

Medalists
gold medal	Boglárka Hari; Anita Sáfrány	Hungary
silver medal	Luisa Ebert; Bianca Golla	Germany
bronze medal	Nataša Ravnić; Anja Vicković	Croatia

The women's pair event at the 2026 World Singles Ninepin Bowling Classic Championships was held in Schwaz, Austria and took place on 31 May 2026.

The world champions became the Hungarians Boglárka Hari and Anita Sáfrány who set new world record with 1329 pins knocked down. The silver medals went to Germans Luisa Ebert and Bianca Golla, while the bronzes were won by Croats Nataša Ravnić and Anja Vicković.

== Background ==
This is the first time the pair competition took place at the World Championships since 2006 edition in Skopje.

== Event ==
=== Starting places ===
Starting places were allocated to nations according to their final ranking at the previous World Team Championships. The nations placed 1st to 5th received three pairs, those placed 6th to 12th received two pairs, and all other nations received one pair.

	(Austria) AUT	(Bosnia and Herzegovina) BIH	(Croatia) CRO	(Czech Republic) CZE	(Denmark) DEN	(Estonia) EST	(France) FRA	(Germany) GER	(Hungary) HUN	(Italy) ITA	(North Macedonia) MKD	(Poland) POL	(Romania) ROU	(Serbia) SRB	(Slovakia) SVK	(Slovenia) SLO	Total
Number of seeds	2	1	3	3	1	1	1	3	3	1	2	2	2	2	2	3	32

=== Results ===
The pair competition was played according to the scheduled allocation of lanes and playing times. Each pair consisted of two players, and each player played one game of 120 balls across four lanes (30 balls per lane), resulting in a total of 240 balls per pair. The players changed lanes according to the prescribed lane rotation system. The result of each pair was determined by adding together the total number of pins knocked down by both players. The ranking was established on the basis of the total score, with the pair placed first declared the winner.

Rank	Team	Result			
Rank	Team	All	Clear	X	Total
1st place, gold medalist(s)	Hungary; Boglárka Hari; Anita Sáfrány	829; 416; 413	500; 266; 234	0; 0; 0	1329; 682; 647
2nd place, silver medalist(s)	Germany; Bianca Golla; Luisa Ebert	821; 405; 416	458; 246; 212	3; 1; 2	1279; 651; 628
3rd place, bronze medalist(s)	Croatia; Nataša Ravnić; Anja Vicković	797; 403; 394	475; 230; 245	0; 0; 0	1272; 633; 639
4	Hungary; Gyöngyi Csongrádi; Dorottya Bordács-Szalai	777; 389; 388	488; 256; 232	0; 0; 0	1265; 645; 620
5	Germany; Sarah Conrad; Celine Zenker	807; 402; 405	453; 224; 229	2; 1; 1	1260; 626; 634
6	Croatia; Klara Sedlar; Amela Nicol Imširović	830; 418; 412	428; 211; 217	3; 1; 2	1258; 629; 629
7	Bosnia and Herzegovina; Renata Kozlina; Tatjana Zlojutro	804; 394; 410	442; 221; 221	4; 1; 3	1246; 615; 631
8	Slovenia; Marija Ahačič Premrl; Brigitte Strelec Juvančič	810; 405; 405	432; 209; 223	1; 0; 1	1242; 614; 628
9	Italy; Laura Runggatscher; Nathalie Profanter	785; 380; 405	444; 238; 206	2; 1; 1	1229; 618; 611
10	Serbia; Jasmina Rašković; Ljiljana Frenc	802; 401; 401	409; 203; 206	1; 1; 0	1211; 604; 607
11	Germany; Jana-Sophie Wallishauser; Diana Langhammer	781; 403; 378	424; 193; 231	4; 2; 2	1205; 596; 609
12	Slovakia; Naďa Poliaková; Vladimíra Vávrová	794; 416; 378	404; 220; 184	1; 0; 1	1198; 636; 562
13	Slovenia; Lea Drnovšek; Sara Rovtar	778; 395; 383	417; 208; 209	2; 0; 2	1195; 603; 592
14	Czech Republic; Barbora Pýchová; Zuzana Honcová	781; 385; 396	414; 218; 196	7; 0; 7	1195; 603; 592
15	Czech Republic; Nikola Kunová; Jana Braunová	771; 388; 383	421; 214; 207	4; 2; 2	1192; 602; 590
16	Poland; Aleksandra Bonk; Julia Hurnowicz	780; 372; 408	411; 193; 218	5; 4; 1	1191; 565; 626
17	Slovenia; Tea Repnik; Ana Oder	787; 399; 388	403; 217; 186	4; 1; 3	1190; 616; 574
18	Austria; Julia Huber; Lisa Vsetecka	815; 421; 394	372; 185; 187	9; 6; 3	1187; 606; 581
19	Croatia; Paula Polanšćak; Venesa Bogdanović	775; 396; 379	411; 225; 186	1; 0; 1	1186; 621; 565
20	Austria; Fiona Steiner; Dominique Rathmayer	802; 408; 394	381; 202; 179	9; 1; 8	1183; 610; 573
21	Serbia; Nevena Đorđević; Dijana Kormanjos	784; 402; 382	393; 185; 208	1; 1; 0	1177; 587; 590
22	Hungary; Enikő Németh; Cintia Bálintfy	802; 402; 400	373; 170; 203	4; 4; 0	1175; 572; 603
23	Czech Republic; Nikola Portyšová; Renáta Babická	759; 378; 381	409; 209; 200	3; 1; 2	1168; 587; 581
24	Slovakia; Jana Poliaková; Natália Šintálová	768; 382; 386	395; 202; 193	4; 0; 4	1163; 584; 579
25	North Macedonia; Elena Avramovska; Mirjana Mladenovska	784; 388; 396	378; 192; 186	6; 4; 2	1162; 580; 582
26	France; Margot Gribelin; Magaly Simon	771; 389; 382	387; 200; 187	9; 3; 6	1158; 589; 569
27	North Macedonia; Dragana Gavrilova; Biljana Gavrilova	766; 393; 373	387; 188; 199	6; 2; 4	1153; 581; 572
28	Estonia; Heret Ots; Gertrud Orrin	754; 389; 365	389; 232; 157	7; 3; 4	1143; 621; 522
29	Romania; Maria Ciobanu; Bernadett Seres	755; 383; 372	376; 201; 175	2; 1; 1	1131; 584; 547
30	Romania; Luminiţa Viorica Dogaru; Daniela Lăcătușu	763; 384; 379	346; 193; 153	13; 4; 9	1109; 577; 532
31	Poland; Sandra Szczepska; Julia Brodziszewska	708; 409; 299	345; 191; 154	7; 2; 5	1053; 600; 453
32	Denmark; Helene Holst Jensen; Mathilde Blicher Steensen	739; 360; 379	314; 138; 176	21; 17; 4	1053; 498; 555
