= 2026 World Singles Ninepin Bowling Classic Championships – Men's pair =

Men's pair at the 2026 World Singles Ninepin Bowling Classic Championships
- Location: Schwaz, Austria
- Dates: 1 June 2026
- Competitors: 65 from 16 nations
- Teams: 33
- Winning score: 1372

Medalists
| gold medal | Daniel Barth; Lukas Funk | Germany |
| silver medal | Lukas Huber; Philipp Vsetecka | Austria |
| bronze medal | Tim Brachtel; Christian Wilke | Germany |

The men's pair event at the 2026 World Singles Ninepin Bowling Classic Championships was held in Schwaz, Austria and took place on 1 June 2026.

The world champions became the Germans Daniel Barth and Lukas Funk who set new world record with 1372 pins knocked down. The silver medals went to Austrians Lukas Huber and Philipp Vsetecka, while the bronzes were won by other Germans Tim Brachtel and Christian Wilke.

== Background ==
This is the first time the pair competition took place at the World Championships since 2006 edition in Skopje.

== Event ==
=== Starting places ===
Starting places were allocated to nations according to their final ranking at the previous World Team Championships. The nations placed 1st to 5th received three pairs, those placed 6th to 12th received two pairs, and all other nations received one pair.

| | (Austria) AUT | (Bosnia and Herzegovina) BIH | (Croatia) CRO | (Czech Republic) CZE | (Denmark) DEN | (Estonia) EST | (France) FRA | (Germany) GER | (Hungary) HUN | (Italy) ITA | (North Macedonia) MKD | (Poland) POL | (Romania) ROU | (Serbia) SRB | (Slovakia) SVK | (Slovenia) SLO | Total |
|---|---|---|---|---|---|---|---|---|---|---|---|---|---|---|---|---|---|
| Number of seeds | 3 | 1 | 2 | 2 | 1 | 1 | 1 | 3 | 3 | 2 | 3 | 2 | 2 | 3 | 2 | 2 | 33 |

=== Results ===
The pair competition was played according to the scheduled allocation of lanes and playing times. Each pair consisted of two players, and each player played one game of 120 balls across four lanes (30 balls per lane), resulting in a total of 240 balls per pair. The players changed lanes according to the prescribed lane rotation system. The result of each pair was determined by adding together the total number of pins knocked down by both players. The ranking was established on the basis of the total score, with the pair placed first declared the winner.

| Rank | Team | Result | | | |
| Rank | Team | All | Clear | X | Total |
|---|---|---|---|---|---|
| 1st place, gold medalist(s) | Germany; Lukas Funk; Daniel Barth | 865; 414; 451 | 507; 268; 239 | 1; 0; 1 | 1372; 682; 690 |
| 2nd place, silver medalist(s) | Austria; Lukas Huber; Philipp Vsetecka | 829; 417; 412 | 535; 295; 240 | 0; 0; 0 | 1364; 712; 652 |
| 3rd place, bronze medalist(s) | Germany; Tim Brachtel; Christian Wilke | 863; 448; 415 | 498; 276; 222 | 0; 0; 0 | 1361; 724; 637 |
| 4 | Slovakia; Erik Kuna; Šimon Magala | 868; 415; 453 | 479; 231; 248 | 0; 0; 0 | 1347; 646; 701 |
| 5 | Croatia; Ivan Totić; Bojan Vlakevski | 833; 404; 429 | 505; 248; 257 | 1; 0; 1 | 1338; 652; 686 |
| 6 | France; Fréderic Koell; Enzo Kempf | 834; 430; 404 | 498; 248; 250 | 0; 0; 0 | 1332; 678; 654 |
| 7 | Croatia; Pere Petrić; Ivan Petrić | 827; 402; 425 | 498; 223; 275 | 2; 2; 0 | 1325; 625; 700 |
| 8 | Serbia; Igor Kovačić; Miloš Simijonović | 838; 437; 401 | 485; 238; 247 | 0; 0; 0 | 1323; 675; 648 |
| 9 | Slovenia; Vid Ponebšek; Žiga Požar | 849; 441; 408 | 472; 213; 259 | 0; 0; 0 | 1321; 654; 667 |
| 10 | Serbia; Mateja Tadić; Alen Kujundžić | 816; 400; 416 | 502; 252; 250 | 1; 1; 0 | 1318; 652; 666 |
| 11 | Hungary; Zsombor Zapletán; Zoltán Móricz | 834; 409; 425 | 477; 256; 221 | 0; 0; 0 | 1311; 665; 646 |
| 12 | Germany; Jürgen Pointinger; Marco Endres | 826; 413; 413 | 478; 240; 238 | 1; 1; 0 | 1304; 653; 651 |
| 13 | Poland; Bartosz Krug; Jakub Kuryło | 808; 410; 398 | 492; 260; 232 | 5; 2; 3 | 1300; 670; 630 |
| 14 | Czech Republic; Zdeněk Ransdorf; Milan Blecha | 807; 401; 406 | 486; 266; 220 | 2; 0; 2 | 1293; 667; 626 |
| 15 | Austria; Matthias Zatschkowitsch; Lukas Temistokle | 821; 411; 410 | 472; 223; 249 | 0; 0; 0 | 1293; 634; 659 |
| 16 | North Macedonia; Uroš Stoklas; Nikola Andonovski | 811; 407; 404 | 465; 247; 218 | 1; 0; 1 | 1276; 654; 622 |
| 17 | Hungary; Zsolt Pákai; Máté Németh | 804; 409; 395 | 464; 230; 234 | 3; 2; 1 | 1268; 639; 629 |
| 18 | Italy; Andreas Dalvai; Armin Egger | 801; 397; 404 | 465; 225; 240 | 0; 0; 0 | 1266; 622; 644 |
| 19 | Slovenia; Matej Lepej; Janže Lužan | 830; 404; 426 | 436; 226; 210 | 0; 0; 0 | 1266; 630; 636 |
| 20 | Serbia; Bojan Kličarić; Dragan Gajin | 792; 409; 383 | 465; 226; 239 | 0; 0; 0 | 1257; 635; 622 |
| 21 | Hungary; Károly Kozma; János Brancsek | 807; 405; 402 | 449; 219; 230 | 1; 1; 0 | 1256; 624; 632 |
| 22 | Czech Republic; Jaroslav Hažva; Michal Pytlík | 804; 406; 398 | 451; 239; 212 | 1; 0; 1 | 1255; 645; 610 |
| 23 | Romania; Ion Cercel; Bogdan Tudorie | 779; 394; 385 | 465; 222; 243 | 4; 4; 0 | 1244; 616; 628 |
| 24 | Slovakia; Jan Bína; Rostislav Gorecký | 817; 419; 398 | 424; 230; 194 | 3; 2; 1 | 1241; 649; 592 |
| 25 | Poland; Jakub Cwojdziński; Gabriel Zastawnik | 763; 365; 398 | 476; 273; 203 | 2; 1; 1 | 1239; 638; 601 |
| 26 | Estonia; Markko Abel; Marek Sööt | 802; 397; 405 | 432; 231; 201 | 6; 3; 3 | 1234; 628; 606 |
| 27 | Austria; Martin Rathmayer; Alexander Tischler | 802; 406; 396 | 418; 224; 194 | 1; 0; 1 | 1220; 630; 590 |
| 28 | Italy; Florian Thaler; Oswald Kofler | 791; 383; 408 | 423; 229; 194 | 3; 1; 2 | 1214; 612; 602 |
| 29 | North Macedonia; Aleksandar Blazevski; Kosta Ristevski | 803; 405; 398 | 397; 186; 211 | 4; 3; 1 | 1200; 591; 609 |
| 30 | North Macedonia; Duško Ajdin; Petar Radović | 785; 388; 397 | 406; 200; 206 | 8; 2; 6 | 1191; 588; 603 |
| 31 | Romania; Roberto-Daniel Laposi; Ștefan Romeo Bălan | 803; 398; 405 | 379; 203; 176 | 3; 1; 2 | 1182; 601; 581 |
| 32 | Denmark; Martin Folmer Hansen; Kasper Holdgaard Juul Kisum | 781; 400; 381 | 374; 215; 159 | 11; 2; 9 | 1155; 615; 540 |
| 33 | Bosnia and Herzegovina; Marijo Prljević | 402; 402; 0 | 222; 222; 0 | 2; 2; 0 | 624; 624; 0 |
