= 2023 World Team Ninepin Bowling Classic Championships =

European bowling competition

10th World Team Ninepin Bowling Classic Championships
- Host city: Varaždin
- Country: Croatia
- Nations: 17
- Sport: 9-pins
- Events: 2
- Opening: May 17, 2023
- Closing: May 28, 2023

Location in Europe
Location in Croatia

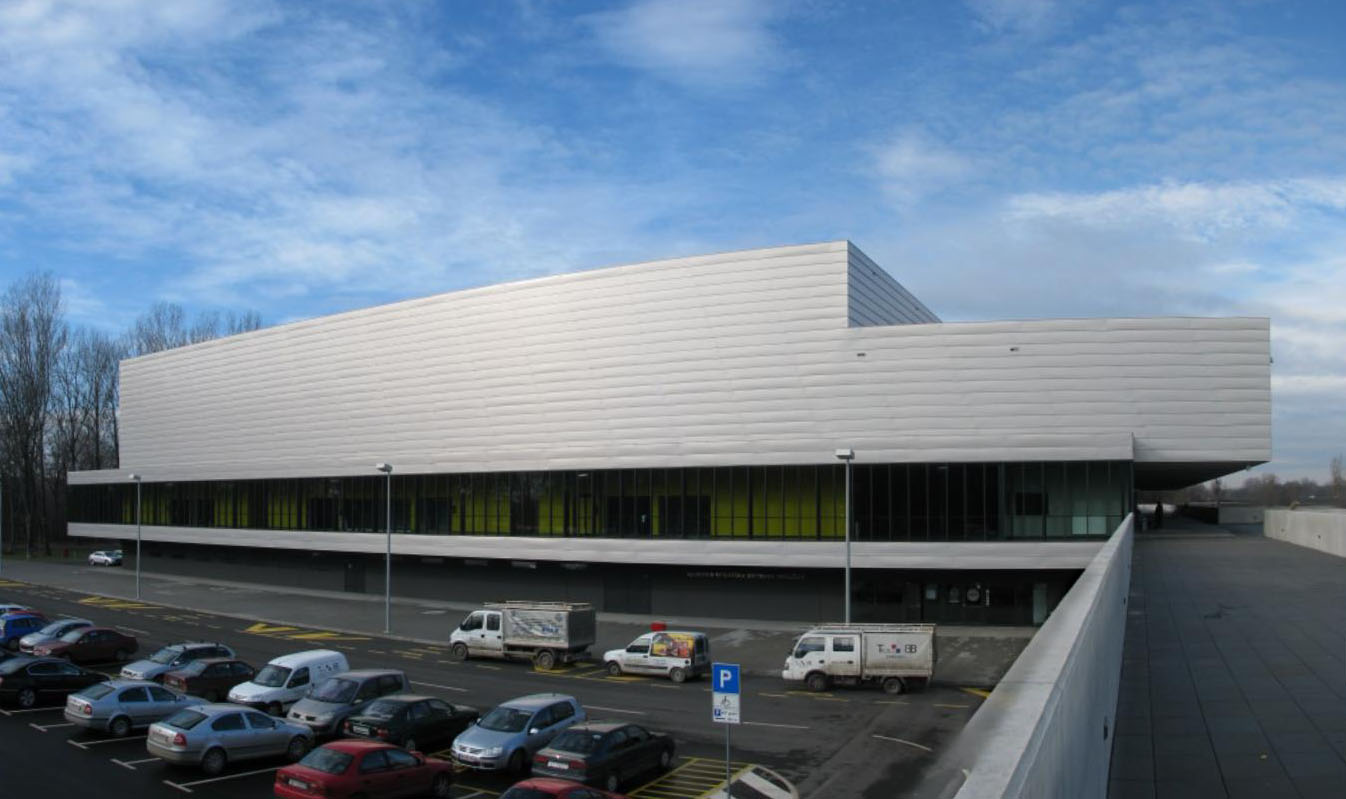
Varaždin Arena - venue where the competition was held

The 2023 World Team Ninepin Bowling Classic Championships was the tenth edition of the team championships held in Varaždin, Croatia, in May 2023.

In men's tournament Austria won their first world champion title, while in women's tournament Croatia captured gold medals for the third time.

== Schedule ==
Two competitions were held.

All time are local (UTC+2).

| Date | Time | Round |
|---|---|---|
| 17 May 2023 | 17:30 | Men group A |
| 18 July 2019 | 09:30 | Men group A |
| 18 July 2019 | 20:00 | Opening ceremony |
| 19 May 2023 | 08:00 | Group stage |
| 20 May 2023 | 08:00 | Group stage |
| 21 May 2023 | 08:00 | Group stage |
| 22 May 2023 | 08:00 | Group stage |
| 23 May 2023 | 08:00 | Group stage |
| 24 May 2023 | 08:00 | Group stage |
| 25 May 2023 | 10:00 | Women Quarterfinals |
| 26 May 2023 | 10:00 | Men Quarterfinals |
| 27 May 2023 | 09:25 | Semifinals |
| 28 May 2023 | 11:30 | Women Final |
| 28 May 2023 | 14:00 | Men Final |
| 28 May 2023 | 17:00 | Medal and closing ceremony |

== Participating teams ==
=== Men ===
- Austria
- Bosnia and Herzegovina
- Croatia
- Czech Republic
- Denmark
- Estonia
- France
- Germany
- Hungary
- Italy
- North Macedonia
- Poland
- Romania
- Serbia
- Slovakia
- Slovenia
- Sweden

=== Women ===
- Austria
- Bosnia and Herzegovina
- Croatia
- Czech Republic
- Denmark
- Estonia
- France
- Germany
- Hungary
- Italy
- North Macedonia
- Poland
- Romania
- Serbia
- Slovakia
- Slovenia

== Medal summary ==
| Event | Gold | Silver | Bronze |
|---|---|---|---|
| Men | Austria; Roman Gerdenitsch; Lukas Huber; Martin Janits; Martin Rathmayer; Lukas Temistokle; Markus Vsetecka; Philipp Vsetecka; Matthias Zatschkowitsch | Germany; Daniel Barth; Tim Brachtel; Lukas Funk; Timo Hoffmann; Mario Nüßlein; Jürgen Pointinger; Manuel Weiß; Christian Wilke | Croatia; Borna Bakran; Luka Bolanča; Alen Kujundžić; Matija Mance; Branko Manev; Hrvoje Marinović; Nikola Muše; Luka Požega; Ivan Totić; Bojan Vlakevski Serbia; Čongor Baranj; Robert Ernješi; Ilija Jevremović; Bojan Kličarić; Igor Kovačić; Adrijan Lončarević; Aleksandar Milinković; Daniel Tepša; Radovan Vlajkov; Vilmoš Zavarko |
| Women | Croatia; Ana Bacan-Schneider; Venesa Bogdanović; Valentina Gal; Amela Nicol Imširović; Matea Juričić; Milana Pavlić; Sara Pejak; Paula Polanšćak; Nataša Ravnić; Klara Sedlar | Austria; Julia Huber; Jennifer Kozak; Monika Lengauer; Monika Nguyen; Nicole Plamenig; Dominique Rathmayer; Fiona Steiner; Lisa Vsetecka | Germany; Jana-Sophie Bachert; Alena Bimber; Alina Dollheimer; Luisa Ebert; Anna Müller; Saskia Seitz; Sandra Sellner; Celine Zenker Romania; Maria Ciobanu; Luminita Viorica Dogaru; Andreea Mioara Drăghici; Réka Fekete; Daniela Lăcătuşu; Florentina Naghi; Alina Ştefania Sanda; Bernadett Seres |

=== Medal table ===
* Host nation (Croatia)

| Rank | Nation | Gold | Silver | Bronze | Total |
|---|---|---|---|---|---|
| 1 | Austria (AUT) | 1 | 1 | 0 | 2 |
| 2 | Croatia (CRO)* | 1 | 0 | 1 | 2 |
| 3 | Germany (GER) | 0 | 1 | 1 | 2 |
| 4 | Romania (ROU) | 0 | 0 | 1 | 1 |
| 4 | Serbia (SRB) | 0 | 0 | 1 | 1 |
| Totals (5 entries) | | 2 | 2 | 4 | 8 |
