= Express Eventing International Cup =

2008 promotion

The official logo of Express Eventing International Cup

The Express Eventing International Cup was a one-day event designed to popularise the sport of eventing.

Organised by equestrian enthusiast John Peace and former Australian international rider Stuart Buntine jointly with British Eventing, the event was first held in Cardiff's Millennium Stadium in 2008.

The event was marred by the death of Olympian Mary King's horse, Call Again Cavalier, and by lack of organisation leading to an abnormally low number of finishers - 6 out of 19 competitors.
