= Champions Cup =

Champions Cup may refer to one of many sports competitions:

== Association football ==
- A3 Champions Cup, an annual association football competition involving the league champions of China, Japan and South Korea
- Brazilian Champions Cup or Copa dos Campeões, an annual association football competition played in Brazil
- CONCACAF Champions Cup, an annual international club soccer competition held in the CONCACAF region (North America, Central America and the Caribbean)
  - CONCACAF W Champions Cup, a women's club tournament
- FIFA Women's Champions Cup, a global club tournament
- Gulf Club Champions Cup, an annual association football competition for clubs in the Persian Gulf
- JFF Champions Cup, the top knockout association football tournament of Jamaica
- Outremer Champions Cup, an annual association football competition played in France
- UEFA Champions League, formerly known as the "European Champions Cup", an association football club tournament in Europe
- Champions Youth Cup, the first edition of an annual football tournament
- Champions Cup (India), the first edition of an annual international football tournament in India
- Champions Cup (All-Ireland), an all-Ireland competition between the league champions of both associations on the island of Ireland
- International Champions Cup, an annual club association football exhibition competition

== Bandy ==
- FIB Champions Cup, an annual international bandy tournament

== Basketball ==
- FIBA European Champions' Cup, now known as EuroLeague

== Cricket ==
- Champions Cup 2000–01, a limited overs cricket tournament played from 29 March 2001 to 4 April 2001 in Perth, Australia

== Curling ==
- Champions Cup (curling), a men's and women's Grand Slam of Curling event

== Field hockey ==
- EuroHockey Club Champions Cup, a field hockey competition for clubs in Europe

== Floorball ==
- Champions Cup (floorball), a floorball competition for the clubs from top four ranked floorball countries

== Horse racing ==
- Champions Cup (horse race), a prestigious Thoroughbred horse race in Japan, formerly known as the Japan Cup Dirt

== Ice hockey ==
- IIHF European Champions Cup, a former annual ice hockey tournament between the champions of national International Ice Hockey Federation competitions
- Champions Cup (ice hockey), the former name of the trophy for the post-season champion of the All American Hockey League

== Inline hockey ==
- Champions Cup (inline hockey), the trophy awarded to the playoff winners of the American Inline Hockey League's Elite Division

== Lacrosse ==
- Champion's Cup, the trophy awarded to the playoff winners in the National Lacrosse League from 1998 to 2017

== Rugby union ==
- European Rugby Champions Cup, top-level European club competition
- NSCRO Champions Cup, a college rugby championship in the United States

== Sailing ==
- EUROSAF Champions Sailing Cup, series of sailing regattas in Europe

== Snooker ==
- Champions Cup (snooker), a professional snooker tournament

== Volleyball ==
- Volleyball Grand Champions Cup, one of many indoor volleyball world titles

== See also ==
- Champions League (disambiguation)
- Championship Cup
