= Koblach =

- Municipality
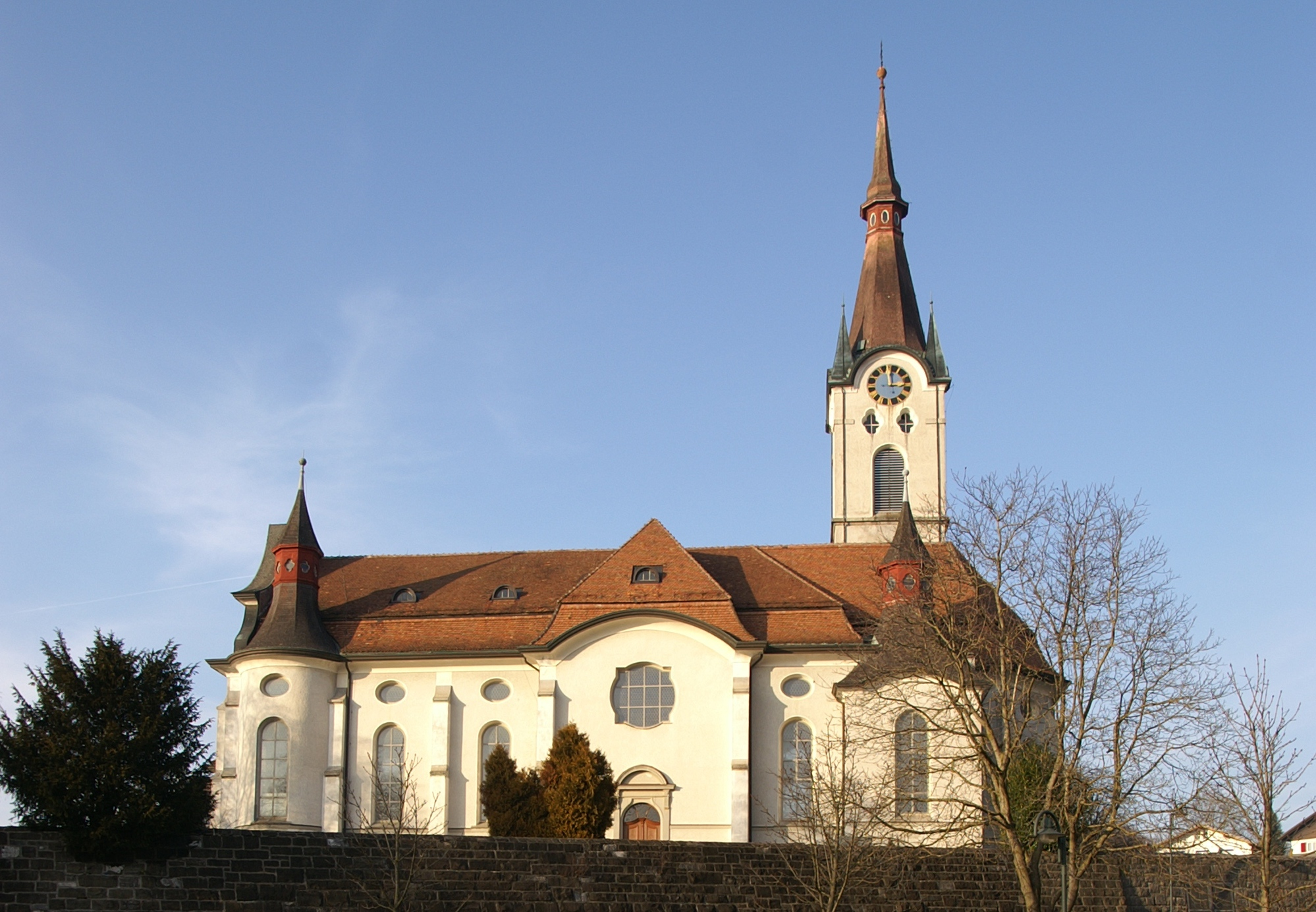

- Coat of arms

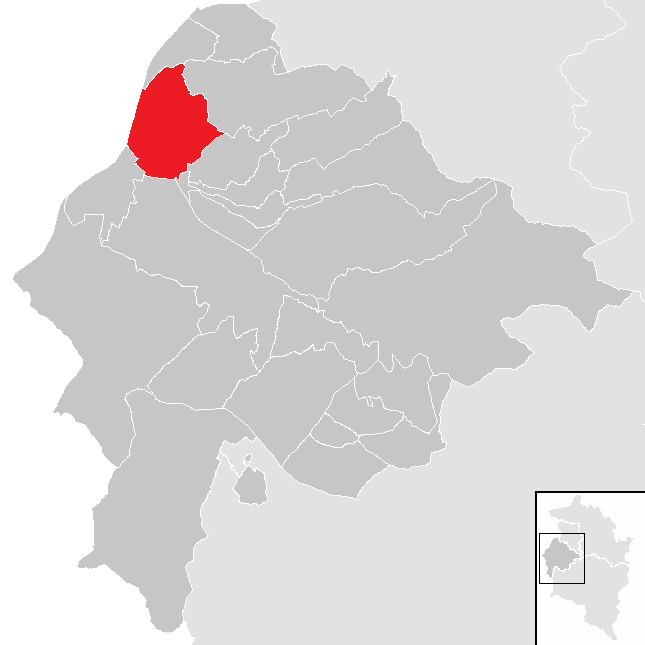
- Location in the district

- Location within Austria
- Coordinates: 47°20′00″N 09°36′00″E
- Country: Austria
- State: Vorarlberg
- District: Feldkirch

Government
  - Mayor: Gerd Hölzl

Area
  - Total: 10.25 km^{2} (3.96 sq mi)
- Elevation: 456 m (1,496 ft)

Population (2018-01-01)
  - Total: 4,577
  - Density: 446.5/km^{2} (1,157/sq mi)
- Time zone: UTC+1 (CET)
  - Summer (DST): UTC+2 (CEST)
- Postal code: 6842
- Area code: 05523
- Vehicle registration: FK
- Website: www.koblach.at

Koblach is a municipality in the district of Feldkirch in the Austrian state of Vorarlberg.

== Population ==
Historical population
Year	Pop.	±%
1869	877	—
1880	875	−0.2%
1890	940	+7.4%
1900	991	+5.4%
1910	1,034	+4.3%
1923	1,046	+1.2%
1934	1,171	+12.0%
1939	1,190	+1.6%
1951	1,405	+18.1%
1961	1,659	+18.1%
1971	2,211	+33.3%
1981	2,633	+19.1%
1991	3,171	+20.4%
2001	3,797	+19.7%
2011	4,200	+10.6%
