= 2025 World Team Ninepin Bowling Classic Championships =

European bowling competition

11th World Team Ninepin Bowling Classic Championships
- Host city: Székesfehérvár
- Country: Hungary
- Nations: 16
- Athletes: 267
- Sport: 9-pins
- Events: 2
- Opening: May 28, 2025
- Closing: June 7, 2025

Location in Europe
Location in Hungary

The 2025 World Team Ninepin Bowling Classic Championships were the eleventh edition of the team championships held in Székesfehérvár, Hungary, at the turn of May and June 2025.

In men's tournament Serbia won their seventh world champion title, while in women's tournament Croatia captured gold medals for the third time defending the title won two years earlier.

== Schedule ==
Two competitions are holding.

All time are local (UTC+2).

Date	Time	Round
28 May 2025	19:30	Opening ceremony
29 May 2025	08:30	Women group stage
30 May 2025	08:00	Men group stage
31 May 2025	08:30	Women group stage
1 June 2025	08:00	Men group stage
2 June 2025	08:30	Women group stage
3 June 2025	08:00	Men group stage
4 June 2025	10:00	Women Quarterfinals
5 June 2025	10:00	Men Quarterfinals
6 June 2025	10:00	Semifinals
7 June 2025	10:30	Women Final
7 June 2025	13:00	Men Final
7 June 2025	16:30	Medal and closing ceremony

== Participating teams ==
=== Men ===
- Austria
- Croatia
- Czech Republic
- Denmark
- Estonia
- France
- Germany
- Hungary
- Italy
- North Macedonia
- Poland
- Romania
- Serbia
- Slovakia
- Slovenia
- Sweden

=== Women ===
- Austria
- Croatia
- Czech Republic
- Denmark
- Estonia
- France
- Germany
- Hungary
- Italy
- North Macedonia
- Poland
- Romania
- Serbia
- Slovakia
- Slovenia

== Medal summary ==
Event	Gold	Silver	Bronze
Men	Serbia; Čongor Baranj; Robert Ernješi; Želislav Jakab; Igor Kovačić; Alen Kujundžić; Mateja Tadić; Daniel Tepša; Radovan Vlajkov; Vilmoš Zavarko	Germany; Daniel Barth; Tim Brachtel; Lukas Funk; Timo Hoffmann; Manuel Lallinger; Mario Nüßlein; Jürgen Pointinger; Jan Sandler; Christian Wilke	Austria; Lukas Huber; Martin Janits; Thomas Langbauer; Martin Rathmayer; Lukas Temistokle; Markus Vsetecka; Philipp Vsetecka; Matthias Zatschkowitsch Hungary; János Brancsek; Ádám Farkas; Zoltán Flavius Fehér; Zoltán Horváth; Levente Kakuk; Norbert Kiss; Károly Kozma; Zoltán Móricz; Zsolt Pákai; Zsombor Zapletán
Women	Croatia; Ana Bacan-Schneider; Venesa Bogdanović; Valentina Gal; Amela Nicol Imširović; Matea Juričić; Sara Pejak; Paula Polanšćak; Nataša Ravnić; Klara Sedlar; Anja Vicković	Germany; Sarah Conrad; Alina Dollheimer; Luisa Ebert; Bianca Golla; Saskia Seitz; Sandra Sellner; Paula Marlene Straub; Celine Zenker	Czechia; Renáta Babická; Natálie Bínová; Jana Braunová; Zuzana Honcová; Alena Kantnerová; Nikola Kunová; Barbora Pýchová; Anna Štraufová Hungary; Júlia-Emese Airizer; Cintia Bálintfy; Gyöngyi Csongrádi; Boglárka Hari; Luca Kis Horváth; Anita Méhész; Irén Nemes; Enikő Németh; Anita Sáfrány; Edit Sass

=== Medal table ===
* Host nation (Hungary)

Rank	Nation	Gold	Silver	Bronze	Total
1	Croatia (CRO)	1	0	0	1
1	Serbia (SRB)	1	0	0	1
3	Germany (GER)	0	2	0	2
4	Hungary (HUN)*	0	0	2	2
5	Austria (AUT)	0	0	1	1
5	Czechia (CZE)	0	0	1	1
Totals (6 entries)		2	2	4	8
