= World Ninepin Bowling Association =

World Ninepin Bowling Association (WNBA)
- Formation: 1973
- Founded at: London, United Kingdom
- Type: Federation of national associations
- Headquarters: Vienna, Austria
- Members: 27 national associations
- President: Petr Vaňura
- Website: WNBA

The World Ninepin Bowling Association (WNBA) is the world governing body of nine-pin bowling, and one of two member associations of the International Bowling Federation. The WNBA counts approximately 250,000 members in 28 countries in Europe, South America and Asia.

== Position within the IBF ==
The WNBA holds the position of a disciplinary association and is thus an independent organ within the IBF. The WNBA is responsible for disseminating nine-pin bowling all over the world and to acquire more nations as members of the WNBA.

== History ==
FIQ (Federation Internationale des Quilleurs) - Tenpin Bowling and Ninepin Bowling

WTBA (World Tenpin Bowling Association)

WNBA (World Ninepin Bowling Association)

FIQ and WTBA merged to World Bowling in 2015.

== Disciplinary associations within the WNBA ==
→ See also: Nine-pin bowling

1. NBC (Ninepin Bowling Classic) – www.wnba-nbc.com
2. NBS (Ninepin Bowling Schere) – www.wnba-nbs.de
3. NBN (Ninepin Bowling National) – www.fiqwnba-nbbk.eu

Given the fact that there are three different kinds of nine-pin bowling lanes, there are three respective disciplinary associations within the WNBA, so-called sections.

=== Classic ===
Classic lanes are the most similar ones to ten-pin bowling lanes. They have a wide, flat ball rolling surface.

=== Bohle ===
Bohle (German for “plank”) lanes have a narrow, concave ball rolling surface.

=== Schere ===
Schere (German for “scissors”) lanes have a narrow, concave ball rolling surface until about the midpoint of the lane. After that, the lane widens linearly to the width of Classic lanes, resembling a pair of opened scissors.

== Events ==
1. Champions League
2. World Championship U14
3. World Championship U18
4. World Championship National Teams
5. World Cup Club Teams
6. European Cup Club Teams
7. NBC Cup Club Teams

== WNBA members ==
1. Asia: 2 (TPE, IND)
2. Oceania: 0
3. Africa: 0
4. Americas: 2 (ARG, BRA)
5. Europe: 23

Country	Name	Classic	Bohle	Schere
Argentina	Fédéracion Argentina de Bolos			X
Austria	Österreichischer Sportkegel- und Bowlingverband	X	X	
Belgium	Königlicher Belgischer Keglerverband			X
Bosnia and Herzegovina	Kuglački savez Bosne i Hercegovine	X		
Brazil	Confederação Brasileira de Bocha e Bolão			X
Croatia	Hrvatski kuglački savez	X		
Catalonia	Fédéració Catalana de Bitlles i Bowling	No current license in any section		
Czech Republic	Česká kuželkářská asociace	X		
Denmark	Dansk Kegle Forbund	X	X	
Estonia	Eesti Veeremängude Liit (Estonian Bowling Association)	X		
France	Fédération Francaise de Bowling et de Sport de Quilles	X	X	X
Germany	Deutscher Kegler- und Bowlingbund	X		X
Hungary	Magyar Bowling es Teke Szövetseg	X		
India	Ninepin Bowling Indian Association	No current license in any section		
Italy	Italienischer Sportkeglerverband	X		
Luxembourg	Fédération Luxembourgeoise des Joueurs de Quilles		X	X
North Macedonia	Kuglarska federacija na Makedonija	X		
Montenegro	Kuglaški savez Crne Gore	X		
Netherlands	Nederlandse Kegel Federatie			X
Poland	Polski Związek Kręglarski	X		
Romania	Federatia Romana de Popice Bowling	X		
Slovenia	Kegljaška zveza Slovenije	X		
Serbia	Kuglaški savez Srbije	X		
Switzerland	Schweizerischer Sportkegler-Verband	X	X	
Slovakia	Slovenský Kolkársky Zväz	X		
Sweden	Asfalkägelsektionen SV Bowlingförbundet	X		
Chinese Taipei	Ninepin Bowling Sports Association			X

== Presidency ==
President
Petr Vaňura		Czech Republic
Vice-President
Tomáš Valík		Czech Republic
Section-Presidents
Classic	Martin Herold	Germany
Bohle	Horst Salutt	Switzerland
Schere	Michael Teschner	Germany
General secretary
George Pomej		Austria
WNBA Academy
Bernhard Geisler		Austria

== See also ==
- World Ninepin Bowling Classic Championships
