= Nine-pin bowling =

Type of bowling

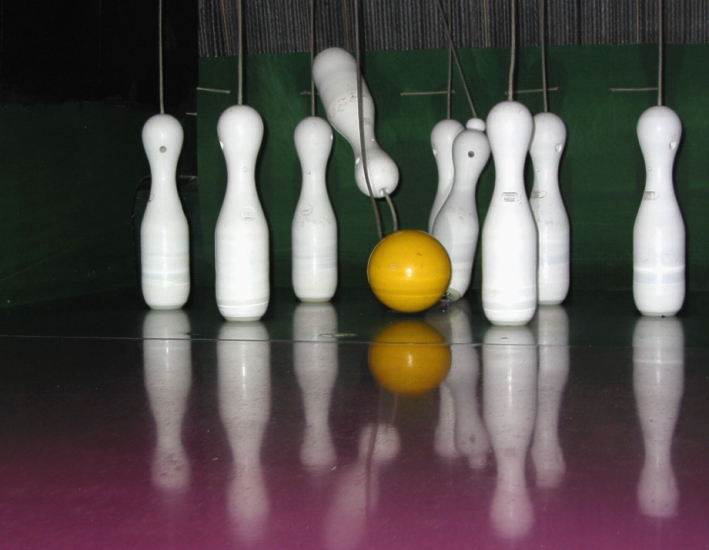
- Nine-pin ball and pins, as used in Germany
- Highest governing body: World Ninepin Bowling Association
- Nicknames: ninepins, 9-pin, kegel, kegeln
- First played: Medieval times, Germany
- Registered players: about 130,000

Characteristics
- Contact: No
- Team members: 6 per side + reserves
- Mixed-sex: Yes, separate competitions
- Type: Team sport, ball sport
- Equipment: Nine-pin bowling ball and pins
- Venue: Nine-pin bowling lane

Presence
- Olympic: No
- World Games: 2005

Nine-pin bowling (also known as ninepin bowling, nine-pin, kegel, or kegeln) is a bowling game played primarily in Europe. European championships are held each year. In Europe overall, there are some 130,000 players. Nine-pin bowling lanes are mostly found in Austria, Czech Republic, Slovakia, Belgium, Germany, Luxembourg, the Netherlands, Estonia, Switzerland, Serbia, Slovenia, Croatia, Poland, North Macedonia, Hungary, France, Brazil and Liechtenstein.

In English-speaking countries, where 10-pin bowling is dominant, facilities for nine-pin bowling are relatively uncommon, though it remains popular in areas such as the Barossa Valley in South Australia where many German people settled in the 19th century. In Australia, it predates 10-pin bowling. A modified version is played in the American state of Texas.

== European version ==
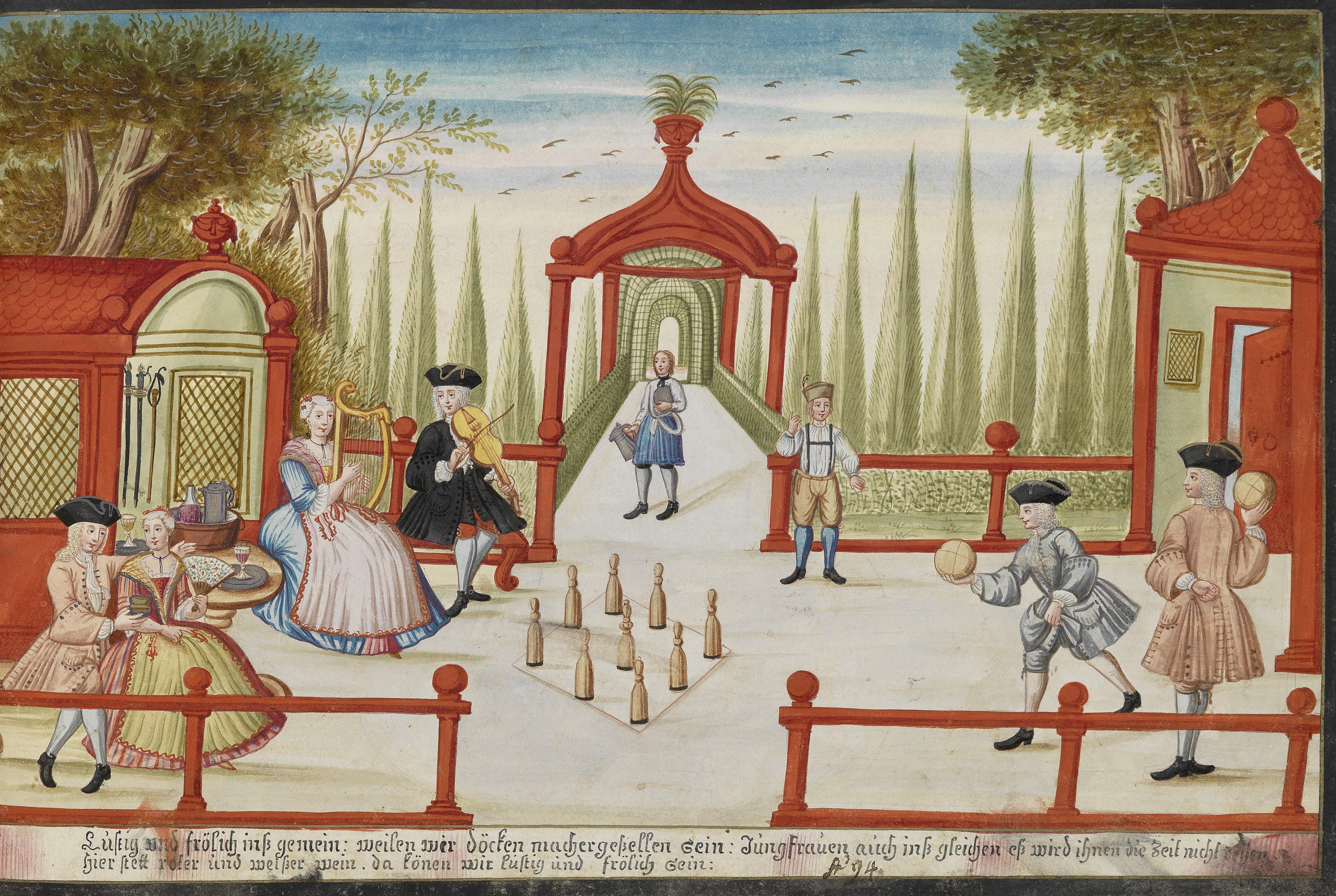
"Music and Bowling" (1736) by Johann Franz Hörmannsperger (b.1710 – d.?)

=== Equipment ===
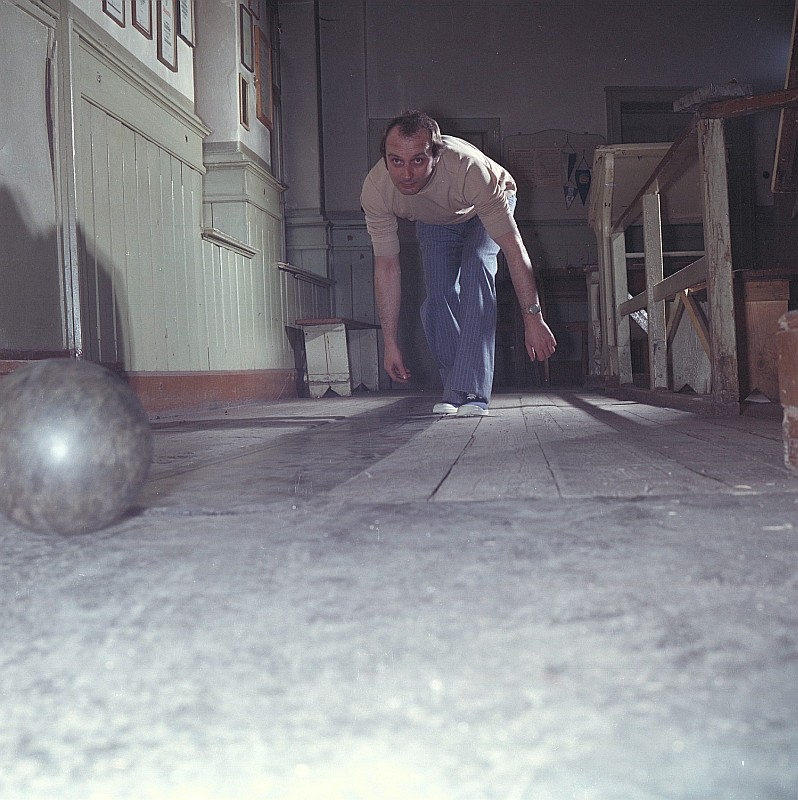
Nine-pin bowler in East Germany, 1976

This game is played by rolling a ball down an alley towards nine pins. There are three variations of lane shape:

- Classic lanes are 19.5 m (64 ft) long and 1.3 m (4.3 ft) wide for their entire length. They are also called "asphalt" as that material was historically used to pave the lanes. This is the most common variant, and the one used for most international competitions.
- Bohle (German for "plank") lanes are 23.5 m (77 ft) long and consist of a narrow strip 35 centimetres (14 in) wide which is slightly concave and slopes upward slightly to the pin deck. It is largely regional in popularity, most common in northeast Germany. The name refers to the wooden planks originally used to form the strip.
- Schere (German for "scissors") lanes are 18 m (59 ft) long. They start with a 35-centimetre (14 in) wide slightly concave strip, similar to Bohle, but have a trapezoidal area beginning at 9.5 m (31 ft) where they widen to the full width of the pin deck, resembling a closed pair of scissors. This variant is also regional, most popular in northwest Germany and adjacent parts of the Low Countries.

The nine pins are placed in a square shape whose diagonal coincides with the axis of the lane. In modern systems the pins are reset by a pinsetter which lifts up the pins, each connected by a string on top, and lowers them back into the square shape for the next throw. The pins usually have a weight of approximately 1.3 kg (2.9 lb).

The ball is 16 cm (6.3 in) in diameter and weighs approximately 2.85 kg (6.3 lb). (For younger or novice players, the ball is 14 cm (5.5 in) and weighs 1.9 kg (4.2 lb).) Unlike the ball used for ten-pin bowling, but like the ones used for other "small-ball" forms of bowling such as five-pin, candlepin and duckpin, the nine-pin ball has no finger holes, although there are also special balls with two finger holes designed for novice and amateur players.

=== Scoring ===
The game is played by taking 120 throws across four lanes. Each player takes 30 throws on each lane. The pins are reset after each throw for the first 15 throws, while the pins are reset on the next 15 throws only after all the pins are knocked down (fallen pins remain out of play until no pins are left). After 30 throws are completed at each lane, players shift to the next lane to the right (except for the player in fourth lane, who moves to the first lane) until the match is over. Pins are added up for each throw.

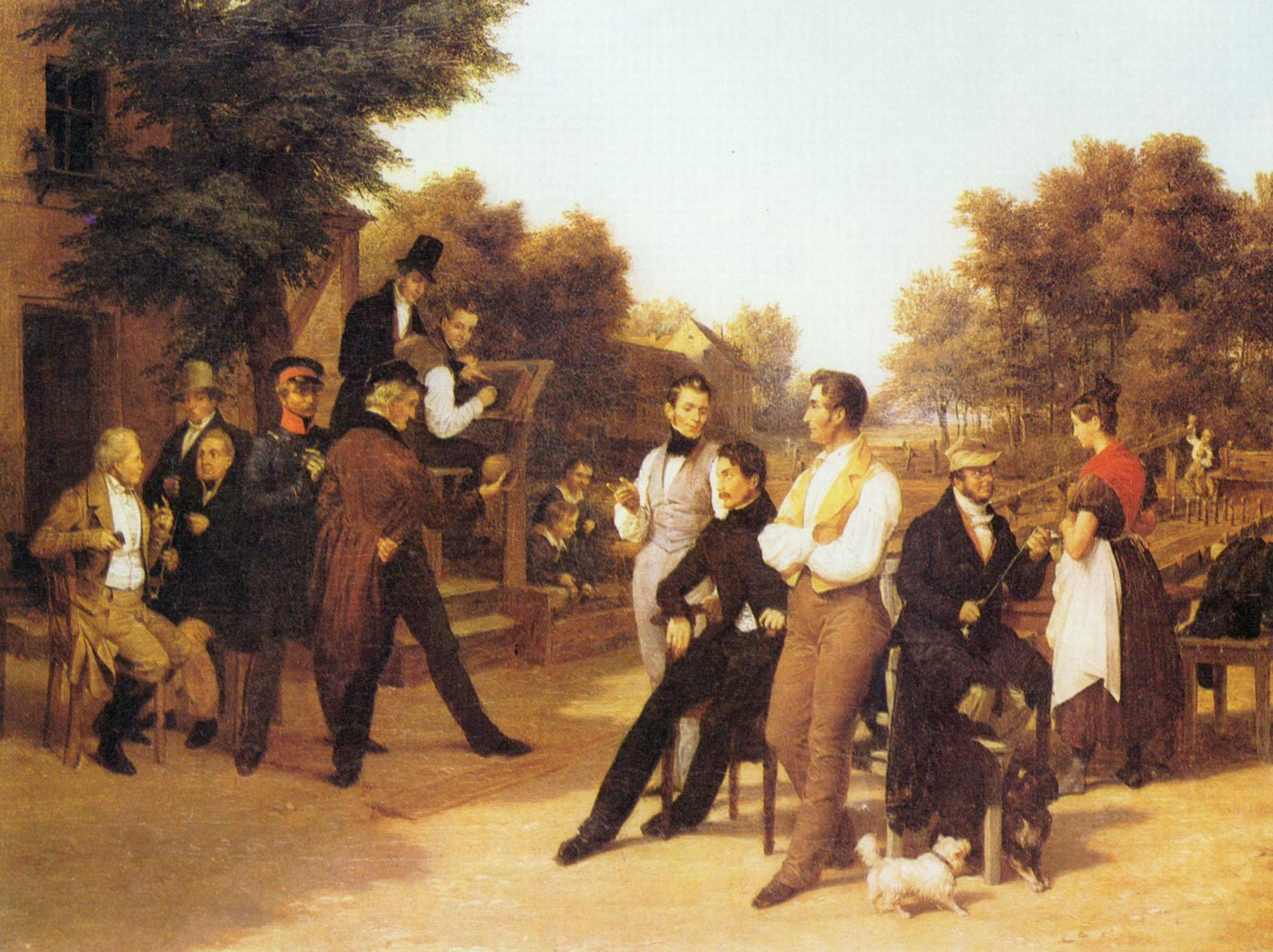
Historic depiction of nine-pin bowling by Friedrich Eduard Meyerheim (1834)

Matches may be played by individual players, where the overall winner is the player with the most pins after all lanes are played, or in a team format.

Teams are composed of six players, with four players starting the match and two substitutions allowed. Players compete against each other for team points. A player who knocks down more pins on a lane gets one set point (each player gets a half point for a draw). The player with more set points after all four lanes are played gets a team point. If they have two set points each after bowling in each of the four lanes, the player with the higher total number of pins gets the team point. If they have the same number of pins, each team gets one-half team point. Players then rotate which member of the opposing team they play against. The team with more team points after all opponent pairings have been completed wins the match. Matches can end in ties.

League play is organised in many World Ninepin Bowling Association member countries, and national championships are held in many countries.

== American version ==
=== Origins ===
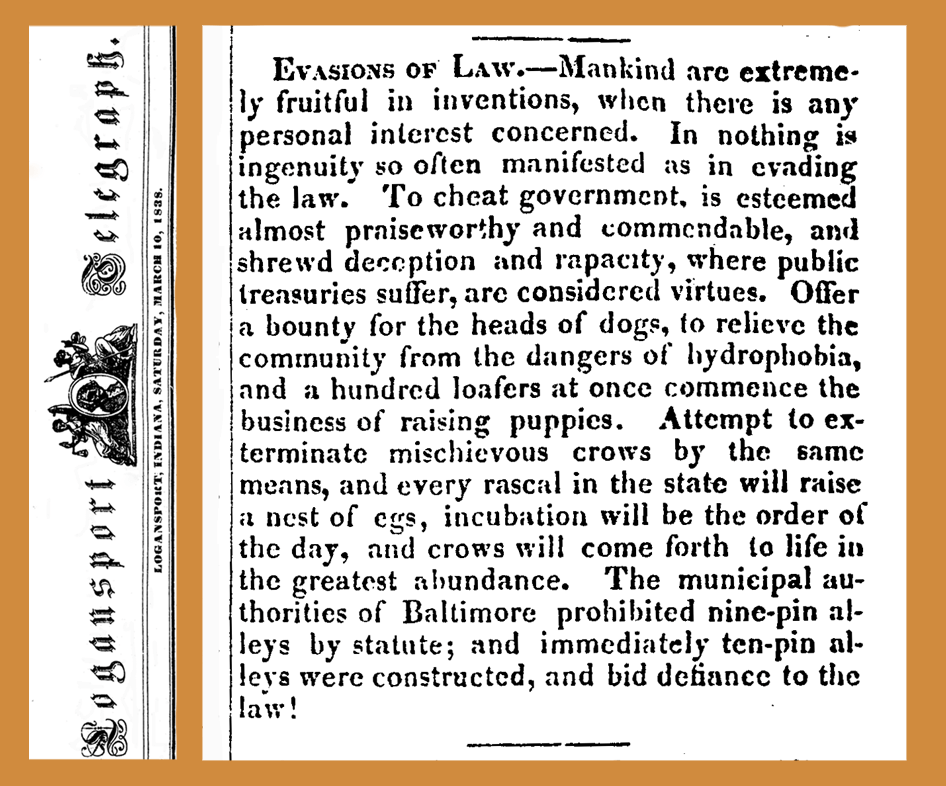
An 1838 newspaper describes how ten-pin bowling was devised to evade a Baltimore law prohibiting nine-pin bowling.

Standardized rules and organization of nine-pins were developed by the American Bowling Congress in 1895. Nine-pins was the most popular form of bowling in much of the United States from colonial times until the 1830s, when several cities in the United States banned nine-pin bowling out of moral panic over the supposed destruction of the work ethic, gambling, and organized crime. Ten-pin bowling is said to have been invented in order to meet the letter of these laws, even with evidence of outdoor bowling games in 1810 England being bowled with ten pins set in an equilateral triangle as is done today in ten-pin bowling.

Today, nine-pin bowling has disappeared from all of the United States except Texas, where, by 1837, ninepin alleys were numerous enough that rather than a ban, the 1st Congress of the Republic of Texas chose to subject them to an annual tax of $150 (equivalent to $4,268 in 2025), and all forms of bowling have remained legal and subject to taxation in Texas ever since. By World War I most Texas bowling establishments, both private and commercial, had changed to ten-pin. However, nine-pin remained popular in predominantly German communities like Fredericksburg, New Braunfels and Bulverde, until the introduction of fully automated pin-setting machinery in the 1950s caused most of them to make the change as well. Those bowlers who still preferred the teamwork and camaraderie of nine-pins then moved to the nine-pins clubs in small outlying communities of Bexar, Comal, and Guadalupe counties.

=== Equipment ===
The American variation of nine-pin bowling is played with the same lane as in conventional ten-pin bowling. The difference is the lack of automatic pinsetter and electronic scoring system. Both of these are done manually, similar to how ten-pin bowling was in the early 20th century. The lane is usually under a dry lane condition (without oil), or rarely oiled in typical house shot, allowing players to release a hook ball in a similar fashion as ten-pin bowling. The pins used in the Texas version of nine-pins are the same dimensions as those used in ten-pins, and the bowlers use ten-pin balls, with finger and thumb holes drilled in them.

=== Scoring ===
Scoring in nine-pin is also different. Each frame begins with a full house. If a bowler knocks down all nine pins in a full house, that bowler has achieved a nine-ringer and is given a score of 9 with a circle around it. There are no additional points for a ringer. If a bowler knocks down all the pins except for the center pin in a full house, that bowler has achieved a twelve-ringer and is given a score of 12 with a circle around it. If a bowler's roll does not result in either “9” or “12” points, that bowler's roll is given a “-“ (dash) or a “✓” (check) which carries no point value.

The one exception to this is the last ball rolled by the last bowler in the frame. This bowler will receive credit for the number of pins knocked down. For example, if the last bowler has rolled their second ball for this frame, and three pins remain standing (six pins knocked down), that bowler will receive credit for those six pins, regardless if that bowler knocked these six pins down or not.

When a bowler takes a turn and knocks down the remaining pins, that bowler receives nine points for that shot, regardless of the number of pins knocked down to receive these nine points. If a bowler knocks down the remaining pins, except for the center pin, that bowler receives 12 points for that shot regardless of the number of pins knocked down to receive those 12 points.

Because bowlers face the pins their teammates have left, the better teams are those who have a mix of bowlers that can hit the left side, hit the right side, or can "roll ringers". This leads to specialization. A good team captain can also help their team by sending the bowlers in the order that maximizes their success.

== See also ==
- Schanzeln
- Skittles (sport)
