= 2026 World Singles Ninepin Bowling Classic Championships – Men's sprint =

Men's sprint at the 2026 World Singles Ninepin Bowling Classic Championships
- Location: Schwaz, Austria
- Dates: 2 June 2026
- Competitors: 32 from 16 nations

Medalists
gold medal	Daniel Barth	Germany
silver medal	Igor Kovačić	Serbia
bronze medal	Zdenĕk Ransdorf	Czech Republic
bronze medal	Žiga Poažr	Slovenia

The men's sprint event at the 2026 World Singles Ninepin Bowling Classic Championships was held in Schwaz, Austria on 2 June 2026.

Gold medal was won by German Daniel Barth, who secured his second gold during at the championships by defeating Serb Igor Kovačić in the final. Bronze medals went to semi-finalists Czech Zdenĕk Ransdorf and Slovenian Žiga Požar.

== Results ==
=== Starting places ===
Starting places were allocated based on each nation's achievements at the previous championships, with one guaranteed place per nation and a maximum of three places per nation in total.

	(Austria) AUT	(Bosnia and Herzegovina) BIH	(Croatia) CRO	(Czech Republic) CZE	(Denmark) DEN	(Estonia) EST	(France) FRA	(Germany) GER	(Hungary) HUN	(Italy) ITA	(North Macedonia) MKD	(Poland) POL	(Romania) ROU	(Serbia) SRB	(Slovakia) SVK	(Slovenia) SLO	Total
Number of seeds	1+1	1	1+2	1+2	1	1	1+1	1+2	1+2	1+1	1	1+1	1+1	1+2	1	1+1	32

=== Schedule ===
The players were drawn into bouts with the reservation that competitors from the same country can not play in the first round against each other.

Round of 32 - Tuesday, 2 June

Match #	Lanes	Player 1	Score	Player 2	Set 1	Set 2	SV
1st unit 12:00 (CEST)
SPM 1	1 – 2	(Poland) Bartosz Krug	2 – 0	(Romania) Roberto-Daniel Laposi	108 – 105	106 – 93	—N/a
SPM 2	3 – 4	(France) Frédéric Koell	1 – 1	(Croatia) Ivan Totić	107 – 115	119 – 117	22 – 25
SPM 3	5 – 6	(Germany) Tim Brachtel	0 – 2	(Czech Republic) Michal Pytlík	98 – 110	107 – 119	—N/a
SPM 4	7 – 8	(Poland) Jakub Cwojdziński	0 – 2	(Czech Republic) Zdeněk Ransdorf	90 – 121	105 – 106	—N/a
2nd unit 12:30 (CEST)
SPM 5	1 – 2	(North Macedonia) Uroš Stoklas	1 – 1	(Croatia) Ivan Petrić	100 – 103	116 – 107	23 – 17
SPM 6	3 – 4	(Czech Republic) Jaroslav Hažva	2 – 0	(Hungary) Zoltán Móricz	110 – 96	117 – 115	—N/a
SPM 7	5 – 6	(Austria) Lukas Huber	0 – 2	(Serbia) Igor Kovačić	110 – 120	102 – 111	—N/a
SPM 8	7 – 8	(Austria) Philipp Vsetecka	2 – 0	(Slovakia) Jan Bína	130 – 109	110 – 101	—N/a
3rd unit 13:00 (CEST)
SPM 9	1 – 2	(Estonia) Marek Sööt	0 – 2	(Germany) Daniel Barth	102 – 104	90 – 117	—N/a
SPM 10	3 – 4	(Hungary) Zsombor Zapletán	2 – 0	(Croatia) Pere Petrić	118 – 108	102 – 98	—N/a
SPM 11	5 – 6	(Italy) Armin Egger	2 – 0	(Romania) Bogdan Tudorie	117 – 103	106 – 101	—N/a
SPM 12	7 – 8	(Italy) Stefan Zini	0 – 2	(Serbia) Alen Kujundžić	97 – 117	112 – 122	—N/a
4th unit 13:30 (CEST)
SPM 13	1 – 2	(Serbia) Mateja Tadić	1 – 1	(Slovenia) Žiga Požar	116 – 99	99 – 117	37 – 38
SPM 14	3 – 4	(Slovenia) Matej Lepej	2 – 0	(France) Enzo Kempf	103 – 94	110 – 103	—N/a
SPM 15	5 – 6	(Germany) Lukas Funk	1 – 1	(Hungary) Máté Németh	108 – 93	112^{5} – 112^{7}	18 – 25
SPM 16	7 – 8	(Bosnia and Herzegovina) Marijo Prljević	1 – 1	(Denmark) Kasper Holdgaard Juul Kisum	95 – 115	113 – 88	38 – 42

Round of 16 - Tuesday, 2 June

Match #	Lanes	Player 1	Score	Player 2	Set 1	Set 2	SV
1st unit 15:00 (CEST)
SPM 17	5 – 6	(Poland) Bartosz Krug	0 – 2	(Croatia) Ivan Totić	103 – 114	90 – 127	—N/a
SPM 18	1 – 2	(Czech Republic) Michal Pytlík	1 – 1	(Czech Republic) Zdeněk Ransdorf	107 – 101	103 – 110	19 – 20
SPM 19	7 – 8	(North Macedonia) Uroš Stoklas	1 – 1	(Czech Republic) Jaroslav Hažva	107 – 88	113 – 122	36 – 44
SPM 20	3 – 4	(Serbia) Igor Kovačić	2 – 0	(Austria) Philipp Vsetecka	101 – 95	122 – 114	—N/a
2nd unit 15:30 (CEST)
SPM 21	5 – 6	(Germany) Daniel Barth	2 – 0	(Hungary) Zsombor Zapletán	118 – 101	124 – 105	—N/a
SPM 22	1 – 2	(Italy) Armin Egger	1 – 1	(Serbia) Alen Kujundžić	106 – 105	112^{3} – 112^{5}	40 – 44
SPM 23	7 – 8	(Slovenia) Žiga Požar	1 – 1	(Slovenia) Matej Lepej	118 – 112	95 – 100	19 – 17
SPM 24	3 – 4	(Hungary) Máté Németh	1 – 1	(Denmark) Kasper Holdgaard Juul Kisum	91 – 99	111 – 86	22 – 16

Quarterfinals - Tuesday, 2 June

Match #	Lanes	Player 1	Score	Player 2	Set 1	Set 2	SV
16:30 (CEST)
SPM 25	3 – 4	(Croatia) Ivan Totić	0 – 2	(Czech Republic) Zdeněk Ransdorf	92 – 118	102 – 106	—N/a
SPM 26	1 – 2	(Czech Republic) Jaroslav Hažva	0 – 2	(Serbia) Igor Kovačić	106 – 110	114 – 120	—N/a
SPM 27	7 – 8	(Germany) Daniel Barth	2 – 0	(Serbia) Alen Kujundžić	130 – 104	118 – 117	—N/a
SPM 28	5 – 6	(Slovenia) Žiga Požar	1 – 1	(Hungary) Máté Németh	115 – 106	99 – 101	44 – 41

Semifinals - Tuesday, 2 June

Match #	Lanes	Player 1	Score	Player 2	Set 1	Set 2	SV
17:00 (CEST)
SPM 29	5 – 6	(Czech Republic) Zdeněk Ransdorf	0 – 2	(Serbia) Igor Kovačić	101 – 120	106 – 108	—N/a
SPM 30	1 – 2	(Germany) Daniel Barth	2 – 0	(Slovenia) Žiga Požar	108 – 102	122 – 109	—N/a

Final - Tuesday, 2 June

Match #	Lanes	Player 1	Score	Player 2	Set 1	Set 2	SV
17:30 (CEST)
SPM 31	3 – 4	(Serbia) Igor Kovačić	0 – 2	(Germany) Daniel Barth	89 – 103	102 – 106	—N/a

=== Bracket ===
Round of 32
(Poland) Bartosz Krug	2
(Romania) Roberto-Daniel Laposi	0
(France) Frédéric Koell	1	22
(Croatia) Ivan Totić	1	25
(Germany) Tim Brachtel	0
(Czech Republic) Michal Pytlík	2
(Poland) Jakub Cwojdziński	0
(Czech Republic) Zdeněk Ransdorf	2
(North Macedonia) Uroš Stoklas	1	23
(Croatia) Ivan Petrić	1	17
(Czech Republic) Jaroslav Hažva	2
(Hungary) Zoltán Móricz	0
(Austria) Lukas Huber	0
(Serbia) Igor Kovačić	2
(Austria) Philipp Vsetecka	2
(Slovakia) Jan Bína	0
(Estonia) Marek Sööt	0
(Germany) Daniel Barth	2
(Hungary) Zsombor Zapletán	2
(Croatia) Pere Petrić	0
(Italy) Armin Egger	2
(Romania) Bogdan Tudorie	0
(Italy) Stefan Zini	0
(Serbia) Alen Kujundžić	2
(Serbia) Mateja Tadić	1	37
(Slovenia) Žiga Požar	1	38
(Slovenia) Matej Lepej	2
(France) Enzo Kempf	0
(Germany) Lukas Funk	1	18
(Hungary) Máté Németh	1	25
(Bosnia and Herzegovina) Marijo Prljević	1	38
(Denmark) Kasper Holdgaard Juul Kisum	1	42

Round of 16
(Poland) Bartosz Krug	0
(Croatia) Ivan Totić	2
(Czech Republic) Michal Pytlík	1	19
(Czech Republic) Zdeněk Ransdorf	1	20
(North Macedonia) Uroš Stoklas	1	36
(Czech Republic) Jaroslav Hažva	1	44
(Serbia) Igor Kovačić	2
(Austria) Philipp Vsetecka	0
(Germany) Daniel Barth	2
(Hungary) Zsombor Zapletán	0
(Italy) Armin Egger	1	40
(Serbia) Alen Kujundžić	1	44
(Slovenia) Žiga Požar	1	19
(Slovenia) Matej Lepej	1	17
(Hungary) Máté Németh	1	22
(Denmark) Kasper Holdgaard Juul Kisum	1	16

Quarterfinals
(Croatia) Ivan Totić	0
(Czech Republic) Zdeněk Ransdorf	2
(Czech Republic) Jaroslav Hažva	0
(Serbia) Igor Kovačić	2
(Germany) Daniel Barth	2
(Serbia) Alen Kujundžić	0
(Slovenia) Žiga Požar	1	44
(Hungary) Máté Németh	1	41

Semifinals
(Czech Republic) Zdeněk Ransdorf	0
(Serbia) Igor Kovačić	2
(Germany) Daniel Barth	2
(Slovenia) Žiga Požar	0

Final
(Serbia) Igor Kovačić	0
(Germany) Daniel Barth	2
