= 2026 World Singles Ninepin Bowling Classic Championships – Women's sprint =

Women's sprint at the 2026 World Singles Ninepin Bowling Classic Championships
- Location: Schwaz, Austria
- Dates: 2 June 2026
- Competitors: 32 from 16 nations

Medalists
gold medal	Nikola Portyšová	Czech Republic
silver medal	Julia Huber	Austria
bronze medal	Amela Nicol Imširović	Croatia
bronze medal	Jana Braunová	Czech Republic

The women's sprint event at the 2026 World Singles Ninepin Bowling Classic Championships was held in Schwaz, Austria on 2 June 2026.

Gold medal was won by Czech Nikola Portyšová, who defeated Austrian Julia Huber in the final. Bronze medals went to semi-finalists Croat Amela Nicol Imširović and Czech Jana Braunová.

== Results ==
=== Starting places ===
Starting places were allocated based on each nation's achievements at the previous championships, with one guaranteed place per nation and a maximum of three places per nation in total.

	(Austria) AUT	(Bosnia and Herzegovina) BIH	(Croatia) CRO	(Czech Republic) CZE	(Denmark) DEN	(Estonia) EST	(France) FRA	(Germany) GER	(Hungary) HUN	(Italy) ITA	(North Macedonia) MKD	(Poland) POL	(Romania) ROU	(Serbia) SRB	(Slovakia) SVK	(Slovenia) SLO	Total
Number of seeds	1+2	1	1+2	1+2	1	1+1	1+2	1+2	1	1+2	1	1	1	1+1	1+1	1+1	32

=== Schedule ===
The players were drawn into bouts with the reservation that competitors from the same country can not play in the first round against each other.

Round of 32 - Tuesday, 2 June

Match #	Lanes	Player 1	Score	Player 2	Set 1	Set 2	SV
1st unit 10:00 (CEST)
SPW 1	1 – 2	(Slovakia) Jana Poliaková	1 – 1	(Poland) Julia Hurnowicz	108 – 99	77 – 97	15 – 24
SPW 2	3 – 4	(Czech Republic) Nikola Portyšová	2 – 0	(Slovenia) Marija Ahačič Premrl	114^{7} – 114^{6}	119 – 101	—N/a
SPW 3	5 – 6	(Germany) Celine Zenker	0 – 2	(Slovakia) Naďa Poliaková	112 – 113	93 – 101	—N/a
SPW 4	7 – 8	(France) Margot Gribelin	0 – 2	(Serbia) Ljiljana Frenc	99 – 106	100 – 118	—N/a
2nd unit 10:30 (CEST)
SPW 5	1 – 2	(Italy) Laura Runggatscher	1 – 1	(France) Aurélie Remy	114 – 96	87 – 100	22 – 17
SPW 6	3 – 4	(Austria) Lisa Vsetecka	1 – 1	(Italy) Marion Thaler	89 – 96	107 – 106	19 – 23
SPW 7	5 – 6	(Czech Republic) Jana Braunová	2 – 0	(Hungary) Cintia Bálintfy	106 – 105	104 – 102	—N/a
SPW 8	7 – 8	(Slovenia) Brigitte Strelec Juvančič	2 – 0	(Austria) Fiona Steiner	107 – 95	98 – 97	—N/a
3rd unit 11:00 (CEST)
SPW 9	1 – 2	(Romania) Maria Ciobanu	2 – 0	(North Macedonia) Elena Avramovska	98 – 93	118 – 92	—N/a
SPW 10	3 – 4	(Germany) Jana-Sophie Wallishauser	2 – 0	(Estonia) Heret Ots	113 – 86	113 – 112	—N/a
SPW 11	5 – 6	(Bosnia and Herzegovina) Tatjana Zlojutro	1 – 1	(Croatia) Amela Nicol Imširović	108 – 91	103 – 114	18 – 23
SPW 12	7 – 8	(Croatia) Klara Sedlar	1 – 1	(Germany) Bianca Golla	106 – 130	118 – 112	23 – 20
4th unit 11:30 (CEST)
SPW 13	1 – 2	(Czech Republic) Nikola Kunová	1 – 1	(France) Magaly Simon	112 – 81	87 – 89	13 – 23
SPW 14	3 – 4	(Austria) Julia Huber	1 – 1	(Italy) Nathalie Profanter	95 – 92	102 – 106	21 – 16
SPW 15	5 – 6	(Denmark) Mathilde Blicher Steensen	1 – 1	(Serbia) Jasmina Rašković	93 – 90	88 – 121	24 – 18
SPW 16	7 – 8	(Croatia) Venesa Bogdanović	2 – 0	(Estonia) Gertrud Orrin	115 – 78	103 – 93	—N/a

Round of 16 - Tuesday, 2 June

Match #	Lanes	Player 1	Score	Player 2	Set 1	Set 2	SV
1st unit 14:00 (CEST)
SPW 17	5 – 6	(Poland) Julia Hurnowicz	0 – 2	(Czech Republic) Nikola Portyšová	79 – 115	108 – 112	—N/a
SPW 18	1 – 2	(Slovakia) Naďa Poliaková	2 – 0	(Serbia) Ljiljana Frenc	117 – 101	98 – 97	—N/a
SPW 19	7 – 8	(Italy) Laura Runggatscher	1 – 1	(Italy) Marion Thaler	104 – 98	95 – 99	23 – 19
SPW 20	3 – 4	(Czech Republic) Jana Braunová	2 – 0	(Slovenia) Brigitte Strelec Juvančič	112 – 95	107 – 94	—N/a
2nd unit 14:30 (CEST)
SPW 21	5 – 6	(Romania) Maria Ciobanu	1 – 1	(Germany) Jana-Sophie Wallishauser	101 – 96	112 – 114	19 – 23
SPW 22	1 – 2	(Croatia) Amela Nicol Imširović	1 – 1	(Croatia) Klara Sedlar	108 – 99	98 – 121	19 – 18
SPW 23	7 – 8	(France) Magaly Simon	1 – 1	(Austria) Julia Huber	100 – 81	90 – 99	18 – 22
SPW 24	3 – 4	(Denmark) Mathilde Blicher Steensen	0 – 2	(Croatia) Venesa Bogdanović	93 – 106	92 – 105	—N/a

Quarterfinals - Tuesday, 2 June

Match #	Lanes	Player 1	Score	Player 2	Set 1	Set 2	SV
16:00 (CEST)
SPW 25	3 – 4	(Czech Republic) Nikola Portyšová	1 – 1	(Slovakia) Naďa Poliaková	90^{8} – 90^{9}	109 – 100	24 – 17
SPW 26	1 – 2	(Italy) Laura Runggatscher	1 – 1	(Czech Republic) Jana Braunová	93 – 105	103 – 101	16 – 22
SPW 27	7 – 8	(Germany) Jana-Sophie Wallishauser	0 – 2	(Croatia) Amela Nicol Imširović	98 – 105	84 – 115	—N/a
SPW 28	5 – 6	(Austria) Julia Huber	2 – 0	(Croatia) Venesa Bogdanović	103 – 102	102 – 88	—N/a

Semifinals - Tuesday, 2 June

Match #	Lanes	Player 1	Score	Player 2	Set 1	Set 2	SV
17:00 (CEST)
SPW 29	7 – 8	(Czech Republic) Nikola Portyšová	2 – 0	(Czech Republic) Jana Braunová	97 – 89	101 – 94	—N/a
SPW 30	3 – 4	(Croatia) Amela Nicol Imširović	1 – 1	(Austria) Julia Huber	124 – 117	98 – 117	19 – 21

Final - Tuesday, 2 June

Match #	Lanes	Player 1	Score	Player 2	Set 1	Set 2	SV
17:30 (CEST)
SPW 31	5 – 6	(Czech Republic) Nikola Portyšová	2 – 0	(Austria) Julia Huber	105 – 99	101 – 94	—N/a

=== Bracket ===
Round of 32
(Slovakia) Jana Poliaková	1	15
(Poland) Julia Hurnowicz	1	24
(Czech Republic) Nikola Portyšová	2
(Slovenia) Marija Ahačič Premrl	0
(Germany) Celine Zenker	0
(Slovakia) Naďa Poliaková	2
(France) Margot Gribelin	0
(Serbia) Ljiljana Frenc	2
(Italy) Laura Runggatscher	1	22
(France) Aurélie Remy	1	17
(Austria) Lisa Vsetecka	1	19
(Italy) Marion Thaler	1	23
(Czech Republic) Jana Braunová	2
(Hungary) Cintia Bálintfy	0
(Slovenia) Brigitte Strelec Juvančič	2
(Austria) Fiona Steiner	0
(Romania) Maria Ciobanu	2
(North Macedonia) Elena Avramovska	0
(Germany) Jana-Sophie Wallishauser	2
(Estonia) Heret Ots	0
(Bosnia and Herzegovina) Tatjana Zlojutro	1	18
(Croatia) Amela Nicol Imširović	1	23
(Croatia) Klara Sedlar	1	23
(Germany) Bianca Golla	1	20
(Czech Republic) Nikola Kunová	1	13
(France) Magaly Simon	1	23
(Austria) Julia Huber	1	21
(Italy) Nathalie Profanter	1	16
(Denmark) Mathilde Blicher Steensen	1	24
(Serbia) Jasmina Rašković	1	18
(Croatia) Venesa Bogdanović	2
(Estonia) Gertrud Orrin	0

Round of 16
(Poland) Julia Hurnowicz	0
(Czech Republic) Nikola Portyšová	2
(Slovakia) Naďa Poliaková	2
(Serbia) Ljiljana Frenc	0
(Italy) Laura Runggatscher	1	23
(Italy) Marion Thaler	1	19
(Czech Republic) Jana Braunová	2
(Slovenia) Brigitte Strelec Juvančič	0
(Romania) Maria Ciobanu	1	19
(Germany) Jana-Sophie Wallishauser	1	23
(Croatia) Amela Nicol Imširović	1	19
(Croatia) Klara Sedlar	1	18
(France) Magaly Simon	1	18
(Austria) Julia Huber	1	22
(Denmark) Mathilde Blicher Steensen	0
(Croatia) Venesa Bogdanović	2

Quarterfinals
(Czech Republic) Nikola Portyšová	1	24
(Slovakia) Naďa Poliaková	1	17
(Italy) Laura Runggatscher	1	16
(Czech Republic) Jana Braunová	1	22
(Germany) Jana-Sophie Wallishauser	0
(Croatia) Amela Nicol Imširović	2
(Austria) Julia Huber	2
(Croatia) Venesa Bogdanović	0

Semifinals
(Czech Republic) Nikola Portyšová	2
(Czech Republic) Jana Braunová	0
(Croatia) Amela Nicol Imširović	1	19
(Austria) Julia Huber	1	21

Final
(Czech Republic) Nikola Portyšová	2
(Austria) Julia Huber	0
