= 2026 World Singles Ninepin Bowling Classic Championships – Men's single =

Men's single at the 2026 World Single Ninepin Bowling Classic Championships
- Location: Schwaz, Austria
- Dates: 1 June 2026 (Qualifying); 4 - 6 June 2026 (Knock-out phase)
- Competitors: 65 from 16 nations

Medalists
gold medal	Alen Kujundžić	Croatia
silver medal	Šimon Magala	Slovakia
bronze medal	Tim Brachtel	Germany
bronze medal	Marco Endres	Germany

The men's single event at the 2026 World Singles Ninepin Bowling Classic Championships was held in Schwaz, Austria. Qualifying took place on 1 June, while the knock-out phase occurred from 4 to 6 June 2026.

Gold medal was won by Serb Alen Kujundžić, who became the new world champion by defeating Slovak Šimon Magala in the final. Bronze medals went to semifinalists German Tim Brachtel, the defending champion and winner of the 2024 edition in Brezno, and fellow German Marco Endres.

== Qualifying ==
=== Starting places ===
The number of competitors was determined by the number of pairs participating in the pairs event. An exception was made for the representative of Bosnia and Herzegovina, who competed individually in the qualification stage.

	(Austria) AUT	(Croatia) BIH	(Croatia) CRO	(Czech Republic) CZE	(Denmark) DEN	(Estonia) EST	(France) FRA	(Germany) GER	(Hungary) HUN	(Italy) ITA	(North Macedonia) MKD	(Poland) POL	(Romania) ROU	(Serbia) SRB	(Slovakia) SVK	(Slovenia) SLO	Total
Number of players	6	1	4	4	2	2	2	6	6	4	6	4	4	6	4	4	65

=== Results ===
All players competing in the pair event with 120 balls were also classified individually in the qualifying round. The best 32 qualified for the knock-out phase.

Rank	Name	Country	All	Clear off	Faults	Total	Notes
1	Tim Brachtel	Germany	448	276	0	724	Q
2	Lukas Huber	Austria	417	295	0	712	Q
3	Šimon Magala	Slovakia	453	248	0	701	Q
4	Ivan Petrić	Croatia	425	275	0	700	Q
5	Daniel Barth	Germany	451	239	1	690	Q
6	Bojan Vlakevski	Croatia	429	257	1	686	Q
7	Lukas Funk	Germany	414	268	0	682	Q
8	Frédéric Koell	France	430	248	0	678	Q
9	Igor Kovačić	Serbia	437	238	0	675	Q
10	Bartosz Krug	Poland	410	260	2	670	Q
11	Zdeněk Ransdorf	Czech Republic	401	266	0	667	Q
12	Žiga Požar	Slovenia	408	259	0	667	Q
13	Alen Kujundžić	Serbia	416	250	0	666	Q
14	Zsombor Zapletán	Hungary	409	256	0	665	Q
15	Lukas Temistokle	Austria	410	249	0	659	Q
16	Enzo Kempf	France	404	250	0	654	Q
17	Uroš Stoklas	North Macedonia	407	247	0	654	Q
18	Vid Ponebšek	Slovenia	441	213	0	654	Q
19	Jürgen Pointinger	Germany	413	240	1	653	Q
20	Mateja Tadić	Serbia	400	252	1	652	Q
21	Ivan Totić	Croatia	404	248	0	652	Q
22	Philipp Vsetecka	Austria	412	240	0	652	Q
23	Marco Endres	Germany	413	238	0	651	Q
24	Jan Bína	Slovakia	419	230	2	649	Q
25	Miloš Simijonović	Serbia	401	247	0	648	Q
26	Erik Kuna	Slovakia	415	231	0	646	Q
27	Zoltán Móricz	Hungary	425	221	0	646	Q
28	Jaroslav Hažva	Czech Republic	406	239	0	645	Q
29	Armin Egger	Italy	404	240	0	644	Q
30	Zsolt Pákai	Hungary	409	230	2	639	Q
31	Jakub Cwojdziński	Poland	365	273	1	638	Q
32	Christian Wilke	Germany	415	222	0	637	Q
33	Janže Lužan	Slovenia	426	210	0	636	
34	Bojan Kličarić	Serbia	409	226	0	635	
35	Matthias Zatschkowitsch	Austria	411	223	0	634	
36	János Brancsek	Hungary	402	230	0	632	
37	Jakub Kuryło	Poland	398	232	3	630	
38	Matej Lepej	Slovenia	404	226	0	630	
39	Martin Rathmayer	Austria	406	224	0	630	
40	Máté Németh	Hungary	395	234	1	629	
41	Bogdan Tudorie	Romania	385	243	0	628	
42	Markko Abel	Estonia	397	231	3	628	
43	Milan Blecha	Czech Republic	406	220	2	626	
44	Pere Petrić	Croatia	402	223	2	625	
45	Marijo Prljević	Bosnia and Herzegovina	402	222	2	624	
46	Károly Kozma	Hungary	405	219	1	624	
47	Dragan Gajin	Serbia	383	239	0	622	
48	Andreas Dalvai	Italy	397	225	0	622	
49	Nikola Andonovski	North Macedonia	404	218	1	622	
50	Ion Cercel	Romania	394	222	4	616	
51	Martin Folmer Hansen	Denmark	400	215	2	615	
52	Florian Thaler	Italy	383	229	1	612	
53	Michal Pytlík	Czech Republic	398	212	1	610	
54	Kosta Ristevski	North Macedonia	398	211	1	609	
55	Marek Sööt	Estonia	405	201	3	606	
56	Petar Radović	North Macedonia	397	206	6	603	
57	Oswald Kofler	Italy	408	194	2	602	
58	Roberto-Daniel Laposi	Romania	398	203	1	601	
59	Gabriel Zastawnik	Poland	398	203	1	601	
60	Rostislav Gorecký	Slovakia	398	194	1	592	
61	Aleksandar Blaževski	North Macedonia	405	186	3	591	
62	Alexander Tischler	Austria	396	194	1	590	
63	Duško Ajdin	North Macedonia	388	200	2	588	
64	Ștefan Romeo Bălan	Romania	405	176	2	581	
65	Kasper Holdgård Juul Kisum	Denmark	381	159	9	540	

== Finals ==
According to the results of the qualification, 32 players were put together in bouts, which took place on standard match rules - 4 sets of 30 throws. The competitor who obtains a larger number of sets wins. With an equal number of sets decides a higher total score.

=== Schedule ===
Round of 32 - Thursday, 4 June

Match #	Start lanes	Player 1	Score	Player 2	Set 1	Set 2	Set 3	Set 4
1st unit 10:00 (CEST)
SCM 1	5 – 6	(Germany) Tim Brachtel	2.5 - 1.5; 698 - 670	(Germany) Christian Wilke	176 - 185	171 - 170	181 - 145	170 - 170
SCM 2	7 – 8	(North Macedonia) Uroš Stoklas	3 - 1; 645 - 592	(France) Enzo Kempf	173 - 158	132 - 155	174 - 140	166 - 139
2nd unit 11:15 (CEST)
SCM 3	5 – 6	(Serbia) Igor Kovačić	3 - 1; 693 - 628	(Slovakia) Jan Bína	170 - 161	184 - 137	170 - 155	169 - 175
SCM 4	7 – 8	(Serbia) Miloš Simijonović	1 - 3; 625 - 666	(France) Frédéric Koell	137 - 156	161 - 145	171 - 181	156 - 184
3rd unit 12:30 (CEST)
SCM 5	5 – 6	(Germany) Daniel Barth	3 - 1; 681 - 651	(Czech Republic) Jaroslav Hažva	159 - 175	166 - 151	183 - 162	173 - 163
SCM 6	7 – 8	(Croatia) Ivan Totić	1 - 3; 615 - 683	(Slovenia) Žiga Požar	135 - 197	153 - 156	144 - 167	183 - 163
4th unit 13:45 (CEST)
SCM 7	5 – 6	(Serbia) Alen Kujundžić	3 - 1; 698 - 681	(Serbia) Mateja Tadić	156 - 162	180 - 162	168 - 164	194 - 193
SCM 8	7 – 8	(Italy) Armin Egger	0.5 - 3.5; 587 - 638	(Croatia) Ivan Petrić	151 - 151	138 - 163	154 - 165	144 - 159
5th unit 15:00 (CEST)
SCM 9	5 – 6	(Slovakia) Šimon Magala	2 - 2; 651 - 650	(Hungary) Zsolt Pákai	164 - 181	142 - 154	176 - 169	169 - 146
SCM 10	7 – 8	(Germany) Jürgen Pointinger	0 - 4; 618 - 685	(Hungary) Zsombor Zapletán	148 - 169	169 - 171	153 - 181	148 - 164
6th unit 16:15 (CEST)
SCM 11	5 – 6	(Czech Republic) Zdeněk Ransdorf	1 - 3; 621 - 656	(Austria) Philipp Vsetecka	149 - 158	165 - 173	175 - 169	132 - 156
SCM 12	7 – 8	(Hungary) Zoltán Móricz	2 - 2; 649 - 648	(Croatia) Bojan Vlakevski	147 - 169	166 - 144	162 - 183	174 - 152
7th unit 17:30 (CEST)
SCM 13	5 – 6	(Germany) Lukas Funk	3 - 1; 676 - 662	(Slovakia) Erik Kuna	172 - 177	167 - 165	168 - 157	169 - 163
SCM 14	7 – 8	(Germany) Marco Endres	3 - 1; 653 - 595	(Poland) Bartosz Krug	160 - 170	174 - 125	169 - 156	150 - 144
8th unit 18:45 (CEST)
SCM 15	5 – 6	(Austria) Lukas Temistokle	4 - 0; 733 - 677	(Slovenia) Vid Ponebšek	184 - 163	198 - 172	181 - 176	170 - 166
SCM 16	7 – 8	(Poland) Jakub Cwojdziński	1 - 3; 620 - 668	(Austria) Lukas Huber	154 - 170	153 - 169	157 - 179	156 - 150

Round of 16 - Friday, 5 June

Match #	Start lanes	Player 1	Score	Player 2	Set 1	Set 2	Set 3	Set 4
1st unit 10:00 (CEST)
SCM 17	1 – 2	(Germany) Tim Brachtel	4 - 0; 657 - 593	(North Macedonia) Uroš Stoklas	154 - 141	166 - 141	177 - 155	160 - 156
SCM 18	3 – 4	(Serbia) Igor Kovačić	1 - 3; 654 - 684	(France) Frédéric Koell	155 - 173	157 - 172	168 - 174	174 - 165
2nd unit 11:15 (CEST)
SCM 19	1 – 2	(Germany) Daniel Barth	3 - 1; 660 - 644	(Slovenia) Žiga Požar	164 - 150	171 - 162	143 - 178	182 - 154
SCM 20	3 – 4	(Serbia) Alen Kujundžić	3.5 - 0.5; 670 - 637	(Croatia) Ivan Petrić	156 - 149	173 - 169	164 - 164	177 - 155
3rd unit 12:30 (CEST)
SCM 21	1 – 2	(Slovakia) Šimon Magala	2 - 2; 673 - 664	(Hungary) Zsombor Zapletán	188 - 160	164 - 171	170 - 163	151 - 170
SCM 22	3 – 4	(Austria) Philipp Vsetecka	3 - 1; 661 - 643	(Hungary) Zoltán Móricz	171 - 166	149 - 157	164 - 161	177 - 159
4th unit 13:45 (CEST)
SCM 23	1 – 2	(Germany) Lukas Funk	0 - 4; 655 - 693	(Germany) Marco Endres	162 - 165	157 - 174	172 - 176	164 - 178
SCM 24	3 – 4	(Austria) Lukas Temistokle	0.5 - 3.5; 632 - 681	(Austria) Lukas Huber	156 - 156	162 - 180	172 - 183	142 - 162

Quarterfinals - Friday, 5 June

Match #	Start lanes	Player 1	Score	Player 2	Set 1	Set 2	Set 3	Set 4
1st unit 16:00 (CEST)
SCM 25	5 – 6	(Germany) Tim Brachtel	4 - 0; 706 - 649	(France) Frédéric Koell	179 - 154	176 - 171	174 - 171	177 - 153
SCM 26	7 – 8	(Germany) Daniel Barth	1 - 3; 656 - 669	(Serbia) Alen Kujundžić	159 - 164	156 - 177	169 - 155	172 - 173
2nd unit 17:15 (CEST)
SCM 27	5 – 6	(Slovakia) Šimon Magala	3 - 1; 664 - 639	(Austria) Philipp Vsetecka	161 - 155	173 - 161	167 - 168	163 - 155
SCM 28	7 – 8	(Germany) Marco Endres	2 - 2; 675 - 662	(Austria) Lukas Huber	174 - 143	169 - 188	164 - 165	168 - 166

Semifinals - Saturday, 6 June

Match #	Start lanes	Player 1	Score	Player 2	Set 1	Set 2	Set 3	Set 4
10:00 (CEST)
SCM 29	1 – 2	(Germany) Tim Brachtel	1 - 3; 687 - 698	(Serbia) Alen Kujundžić	173 - 180	176 - 185	167 - 170	171 - 163
SCM 30	3 – 4	(Slovakia) Šimon Magala	3 - 1; 654 - 631	(Germany) Marco Endres	171 - 153	163 - 162	168 - 171	152 - 145

Final - Saturday, 6 June

Match #	Start lanes	Player 1	Score	Player 2	Set 1	Set 2	Set 3	Set 4
11:45 (CEST)
SCM 31	5 – 6	(Serbia) Alen Kujundžić	3 - 1; 705 - 664	(Slovakia) Šimon Magala	165 - 184	175 - 141	194 - 180	171 - 159

=== Bracket ===
Round of 32; 4 June
1	(Germany) Tim Brachtel	2.5	698
32	(Germany) Christian Wilke	1.5	670
17	(North Macedonia) Uroš Stoklas	3	645
16	(France) Enzo Kempf	1	592
9	(Serbia) Igor Kovačić	3	693
24	(Slovakia) Jan Bína	1	628
25	(Serbia) Miloš Simijonović	1	625
8	(France) Frédéric Koell	3	666
5	(Germany) Daniel Barth	3	681
28	(Czech Republic) Jaroslav Hažva	1	651
21	(Croatia) Ivan Totić	1	615
12	(Slovenia) Žiga Požar	3	683
13	(Serbia) Alen Kujundžić	3	698
20	(Serbia) Mateja Tadić	1	681
29	(Italy) Armin Egger	0.5	587
4	(Croatia) Ivan Petrić	3.5	638
3	(Slovakia) Šimon Magala	2	651
30	(Hungary) Zsolt Pákai	2	650
19	(Germany) Jürgen Pointinger	0	618
14	(Hungary) Zsombor Zapletán	4	685
11	(Czech Republic) Zdeněk Ransdorf	1	621
22	(Austria) Philipp Vsetecka	3	656
27	(Hungary) Zoltán Móricz	2	649
6	(Croatia) Bojan Vlakevski	2	648
7	(Germany) Lukas Funk	3	676
26	(Slovakia) Erik Kuna	1	662
23	(Germany) Marco Endres	3	653
10	(Poland) Bartosz Krug	1	595
15	(Austria) Lukas Temistokle	4	733
18	(Slovenia) Vid Ponebšek	0	677
31	(Poland) Jakub Cwojdziński	1	620
2	(Austria) Lukas Huber	3	668

Round of 16; 5 June
(Germany) Tim Brachtel	4	657
(North Macedonia) Uroš Stoklas	0	593
(Serbia) Igor Kovačić	1	654
(France) Frédéric Koell	3	684
(Germany) Daniel Barth	3	660
(Slovenia) Žiga Požar	1	644
(Serbia) Alen Kujundžić	3.5	670
(Croatia) Ivan Petrić	0.5	637
(Slovakia) Šimon Magala	2	673
(Hungary) Zsombor Zapletán	2	664
(Austria) Philipp Vsetecka	3	661
(Hungary) Zoltán Móricz	1	643
(Germany) Lukas Funk	0	655
(Germany) Marco Endres	4	693
(Austria) Lukas Temistokle	0.5	632
(Austria) Lukas Huber	3.5	681

Quarterfinals; 5 June
(Germany) Tim Brachtel	4	706
(France) Frédéric Koell	0	649
(Germany) Daniel Barth	1	656
(Serbia) Alen Kujundžić	3	669
(Slovakia) Šimon Magala	3	664
(Austria) Philipp Vsetecka	1	639
(Germany) Marco Endres	2	675
(Austria) Lukas Huber	2	662

Semifinals; 6 June
(Germany) Tim Brachtel	1	687
(Serbia) Alen Kujundžić	3	698
(Slovakia) Šimon Magala	3	654
(Germany) Marco Endres	1	631

Final; 6 June
(Serbia) Alen Kujundžić	3	705
(Slovakia) Šimon Magala	1
