= 2026 World Singles Ninepin Bowling Classic Championships – Women's tandem =

Women's tandem at the 2026 World Singles Ninepin Bowling Classic Championships
- Location: Schwaz, Austria
- Dates: 3 June 2026
- Competitors: 32 from 16 nations
- Teams: 16

Medalists
gold medal	Sarah Conrad; Luisa Ebert	Germany
silver medal	Paula Polanšćak; Anja Vicković	Croatia
bronze medal	Dominique Rathmayer; Lisa Vsetecka	Austria
bronze medal	Boglárka Hari; Anita Sáfrány	Hungary

The women's tandem event at the 2026 World Singles Ninepin Bowling Classic Championships was held in Schwaz, Austria on 3 June 2026.

Gold medal was won by Germans Sarah Conrad and Luisa Ebert, who defeated Croats Paula Polanšćak and Anja Vicković in the final. Bronze medals went to semi-finalists Austrians Dominique Rathmayer and Lisa Vsetecka, and Hungarians Boglárka Hari and Anita Sáfrány.

In the round of 16, Conrad and Ebert also set a new world record of 352 in their match against Poland.

== Background ==
This is the first time the events of women's and men's tandem took place at the championships. Previous editions featured only mixed tandem event with more starting places.

== Results ==
=== Starting places ===
Each nation was allocated one starting place in the women's tandem event, with a total of 16 tandems entered.

	(Austria) AUT	(Bosnia and Herzegovina) BIH	(Croatia) CRO	(Czech Republic) CZE	(Denmark) DEN	(Estonia) EST	(France) FRA	(Germany) GER	(Hungary) HUN	(Italy) ITA	(North Macedonia) MKD	(Poland) POL	(Romania) ROU	(Serbia) SRB	(Slovakia) SVK	(Slovenia) SLO	Total
Number of seeds	1	1	1	1	1	1	1	1	1	1	1	1	1	1	1	1	16

=== Schedule ===
The tandems were drawn into bouts during technical meeting before championships started.

Round of 16 - Wednesday, 3 June

Match #	Lanes	Nation 1	Player 1	Score	Nation 2	Player 2	Set 1	Set 2	SV
1st unit 10:00 (CEST)
TAW 1	1 – 2	Slovenia	Sara Rovtar; Lea Drnovšek	1 - 1	Romania	Luminita Viorica Dogaru; Maria Ciobanu	166 - 133	146 - 152	21 - 26
TAW 2	3 – 4	Czech Republic	Zuzana Honcová; Renáta Babická	1 - 1	Croatia	Anja Vicković; Paula Polanšćak	159 - 151	144 - 150	48 - 51
TAW 3	5 – 6	North Macedonia	Biljana Gavrilova; Dragana Gavrilova	1 - 1	Slovakia	Natália Šintálová; Vladimíra Vávrová	134 - 166	135 - 128	26 - 28
TAW 4	7 – 8	Austria	Dominique Rathmayer; Lisa Vsetecka	1 - 1	Italy	Marion Thaler; Doris Libardi	136 - 123	139 - 140	29 - 17
2nd unit 10:40 (CEST)
TAW 5	1 – 2	France	Aurélie Rémy; Magaly Simon	1 - 1	Hungary	Anita Sáfrány; Boglárka Hari	157 - 155	152 - 162	25 - 30
TAW 6	3 – 4	Bosnia and Herzegovina	Renata Kozlina; Tatjana Zlojutro	1 - 1	Serbia	Ljiljana Frenc; Nevena Đorđević	140 - 158	154 - 148	29 - 26
TAW 7	5 – 6	Denmark	Helene Holst Jensen; Mathilde Blicher Steensen	1 - 1	Estonia	Heret Ots; Gertrud Orrin	137 - 128	112 - 157	25 - 27
TAW 8	7 – 8	Germany	Sarah Conrad; Luisa Ebert	2 - 0	Poland	Julia Hurnowicz; Sandra Szczepska	175 - 164	177 - 143	—N/a

Quarterfinals - Wednesday, 3 June

Match #	Lanes	Nation 1	Player 1	Score	Nation 2	Player 2	Set 1	Set 2	SV
12:40 (CEST)
TAW 9	5 – 6	Romania	Luminita Viorica Dogaru; Maria Ciobanu	1 - 1	Croatia	Anja Vicković; Paula Polanšćak	153 - 158	167 - 156	22 - 30
TAW 10	1 – 2	Slovakia	Natália Šintálová; Vladimíra Vávrová	1 - 1	Austria	Dominique Rathmayer; Lisa Vsetecka	126 - 174	140 - 139	20 - 22
TAW 11	7 – 8	Hungary	Anita Sáfrány; Boglárka Hari	2 - 0	Bosnia and Herzegovina	Renata Kozlina; Tatjana Zlojutro	160 - 132	181 - 141	—N/a
TAW 12	3 – 4	Estonia	Heret Ots; Gertrud Orrin	0 - 2	Germany	Sarah Conrad; Luisa Ebert	129 - 151	142 - 144	—N/a

Semifinals - Wednesday, 3 June

Match #	Lanes	Nation 1	Player 1	Score	Nation 2	Player 2	Set 1	Set 2	SV
14:00 (CEST)
TAW 13	3 – 4	Croatia	Anja Vicković; Paula Polanšćak	2 - 0	Austria	Dominique Rathmayer; Lisa Vsetecka	172 - 142	159 - 140	—N/a
TAW 14	1 – 2	Hungary	Anita Sáfrány; Boglárka Hari	1 - 1	Germany	Sarah Conrad; Luisa Ebert	149 - 167	155 - 137	21 - 31

Final - Wednesday, 3 June

Match #	Lanes	Nation 1	Player 1	Score	Nation 2	Player 2	Set 1	Set 2	SV
14:40 (CEST)
TAW 15	5 – 6	Croatia	Anja Vicković; Paula Polanšćak	1 - 1	Germany	Sarah Conrad; Luisa Ebert	148 - 159	181 - 147	24 - 27

=== Bracket ===
First round
(Slovenia) Sara Rovtar (Slovenia) Lea Drnovšek	166	146	21
(Romania) Luminita Viorica Dogaru (Romania) Maria Ciobanu	133	152	26
(Czech Republic) Zuzana Honcová (Czech Republic) Renáta Babická	159	144	48
(Croatia) Anja Vicković (Croatia) Paula Polanšćak	151	150	51
(North Macedonia) Biljana Gavrilova (North Macedonia) Dragana Gavrilova	134	135	26
(Slovakia) Natália Šintálová (Slovakia) Vladimíra Vávrová	166	128	28
(Austria) Dominique Rathmayer (Austria) Lisa Vsetecka	136	139	29
(Italy) Marion Thaler (Italy) Doris Libardi	123	140	17
(France) Aurélie Rémy (France) Magaly Simon	157	152	25
(Hungary) Anita Sáfrány (Hungary) Boglárka Hari	155	162	30
(Bosnia and Herzegovina) Renata Kozlina (Bosnia and Herzegovina) Tatjana Zlojutro	140	154	29
(Serbia) Ljiljana Frenc (Serbia) Nevena Đorđević	158	148	26
(Denmark) Helene Holst Jensen (Denmark) Mathilde Blicher Steensen	137	112	25
(Estonia) Heret Ots (Estonia) Gertrud Orrin	128	157	27
(Germany) Sarah Conrad (Germany) Luisa Ebert	175	177
(Poland) Julia Hurnowicz (Poland) Sandra Szczepska	164	143

Quarter-finals
(Romania) Luminita Viorica Dogaru (Romania) Maria Ciobanu	153	167	22
(Croatia) Anja Vicković (Croatia) Paula Polanšćak	158	156	30
(Slovakia) Natália Šintálová (Slovakia) Vladimíra Vávrová	126	140	20
(Austria) Dominique Rathmayer (Austria) Lisa Vsetecka	174	139	22
(Hungary) Anita Sáfrány (Hungary) Boglárka Hari	160	181
(Bosnia and Herzegovina) Renata Kozlina (Bosnia and Herzegovina) Tatjana Zlojutro	132	141
(Estonia) Heret Ots (Estonia) Gertrud Orrin	129	142
(Germany) Sarah Conrad (Germany) Luisa Ebert	151	144

Semi-finals
(Croatia) Anja Vicković (Croatia) Paula Polanšćak	172	159
(Austria) Dominique Rathmayer (Austria) Lisa Vsetecka	142	140
(Hungary) Anita Sáfrány (Hungary) Boglárka Hari	149	155	21
(Germany) Sarah Conrad (Germany) Luisa Ebert	167	137	31

Final
(Croatia) Anja Vicković (Croatia) Paula Polanšćak	148	181	24
(Germany) Sarah Conrad (Germany) Luisa Ebert	159	147	27
