= 2026 World Singles Ninepin Bowling Classic Championships – Mixed tandem =

Mixed tandem at the 2026 World Singles Ninepin Bowling Classic Championships
- Location: Schwaz, Austria
- Dates: 3 June 2026
- Competitors: 32 from 16 nations
- Teams: 16

Medalists
gold medal	Nataša Ravnić; Bojan Vlakevski	Croatia
silver medal	Jana Poliaková; Rostislav Gorecký	Slovakia
bronze medal	Dorottya Bordács-Szalai; Zsolt Pákai	Hungary
bronze medal	Laura Runggatscher; Armin Egger	Italy

The mixed tandem event at the 2026 World Singles Ninepin Bowling Classic Championships was held in Schwaz, Austria on 3 June 2026.

Gold medal was won by Croats Nataša Ravnić and Bojan Vlakevski, who defeated Slovaks Jana Poliaková and Rostislav Gorecký in the final. Bronze medals went to semi-finalists Hungarians Dorottya Bordács-Szalai and Zsolt Pákai and Italians Laura Runggatscher and Armin Egger.

In the quarterfinal, Ravnić and Vlakevski also set a new world record of 348 in their match against France.

== Background ==
Croatia entered the competition as the defending world champion in the mixed tandem event. However, the title-winning pair was unable to defend its crown, as Alen Kujundžić had changed his sporting nationality and returned to represent his native Serbia.

The format of the event was also modified. Following the introduction of women’s and men’s tandems as separate events in the championship programme, the number of mixed tandem entries was reduced to 16, with each participating country permitted to enter only one pair.

== Results ==
=== Starting places ===
Each nation was allocated one starting place in the mixed tandem event, with a total of 16 tandems entered.

	(Austria) AUT	(Bosnia and Herzegovina) BIH	(Croatia) CRO	(Czech Republic) CZE	(Denmark) DEN	(Estonia) EST	(France) FRA	(Germany) GER	(Hungary) HUN	(Italy) ITA	(North Macedonia) MKD	(Poland) POL	(Romania) ROU	(Serbia) SRB	(Slovakia) SVK	(Slovenia) SLO	Total
Number of seeds	1	1	1	1	1	1	1	1	1	1	1	1	1	1	1	1	16

=== Schedule ===
The tandems were drawn into bouts during technical meeting before championships started.

Round of 16 - Wednesday, 3 June

Match #	Lanes	Nation 1	Tandem 1	Score	Nation 2	Tandem 2	Set 1	Set 2	SV
1st unit 15:30 (CEST)
MIX 1	1 – 2	Slovakia	Jana Poliaková; Rostislav Gorecký	2 - 0	Poland	Aleksandra Bonk; Bartosz Krug	156 - 142	175 - 160	—N/a
MIX 2	3 – 4	Bosnia and Herzegovina	Renata Kozlina; Marijo Prljevic	1 - 1	Serbia	Jasmina Rašković; Mateja Tadić	164 - 158	144 - 169	28 - 32
MIX 3	5 – 6	Italy	Laura Runggatscher; Armin Egger	2 - 0	Romania	Luminita Viorica Dogaru; Ion Cercel	139 - 138	162 - 150	—N/a
MIX 4	7 – 8	Denmark	Helene Holst Jensen; Martin Folmer Hansen	1 - 1	Czech Republic	Barbora Pýchová; Michal Pytlík	145 - 136	123 - 128	18 - 25
2nd unit 16:10 (CEST)
MIX 5	1 – 2	Estonia	Heret Ots; Markko Abel	2 - 0	North Macedonia	Mirjana Mladenovska; Duško Ajdin	158 - 141	145 - 121	—N/a
MIX 6	3 – 4	Hungary	Dorottya Bordács-Szalai; Zsolt Pákai	1 - 1	Slovenia	Tea Repnik; Vid Ponebšek	164 - 150	152 - 175	28 - 26
MIX 7	5 – 6	Austria	Dominique Rathmayer; Martin Rathmayer	1 - 1	Croatia	Nataša Ravnić; Bojan Vlakevski	134 - 158	163 - 152	17 - 28
MIX 8	7 – 8	France	Margot Gribelin; Frédéric Koell	1 - 1	Germany	Diana Langhammer; Marco Endres	152 - 153	165 - 137	27 - 25

Quarterfinals - Wednesday, 3 June

Match #	Lanes	Nation 1	Tandem 1	Score	Nation 2	Tandem 2	Set 1	Set 2	SV
16:50 (CEST)
MIX 9	5 – 6	Slovakia	Jana Poliaková; Rostislav Gorecký	2 - 0	Serbia	Jasmina Rašković; Mateja Tadić	149 - 144	161 - 159	—N/a
MIX 10	1 – 2	Italy	Laura Runggatscher; Armin Egger	2 - 0	Czech Republic	Barbora Pýchová; Michal Pytlík	149 - 138	150 - 139	—N/a
MIX 11	7 – 8	Estonia	Heret Ots; Markko Abel	1 - 1	Hungary	Dorottya Bordács-Szalai; Zsolt Pákai	160 - 140	138 - 141	27 - 28
MIX 12	3 – 4	Croatia	Nataša Ravnić; Bojan Vlakevski	2 - 0	France	Margot Gribelin; Frédéric Koell	165 - 147	183 - 160	—N/a

Semifinals - Wednesday, 3 June

Match #	Lanes	Nation 1	Tandem 1	Score	Nation 2	Tandem 2	Set 1	Set 2	SV
17:30 (CEST)
MIX 13	3 – 4	Slovakia	Jana Poliaková; Rostislav Gorecký	2 - 0	Italy	Laura Runggatscher; Armin Egger	150 - 143	142 - 130	—N/a
MIX 14	5 – 6	Hungary	Dorottya Bordács-Szalai; Zsolt Pákai	0 - 2	Croatia	Nataša Ravnić; Bojan Vlakevski	144 - 148	132 - 174	—N/a

Final - Wednesday, 3 June

Match #	Lanes	Nation 1	Tandem 1	Score	Nation 2	Tandem 2	Set 1	Set 2	SV
18:10 (CEST)
MIX 15	4 – 5	Slovakia	Jana Poliaková; Rostislav Gorecký	0 - 2	Croatia	Nataša Ravnić; Bojan Vlakevski	147^{29} - 147^{31}	157^{12} - 157^{16}	—N/a

=== Bracket ===
First round
(Slovakia) Jana Poliaková (Slovakia) Rostislav Gorecký	156	175
(Poland) Aleksandra Bonk (Poland) Bartosz Krug	142	160
(Bosnia and Herzegovina) Renata Kozlina (Bosnia and Herzegovina) Marijo Prljevic	164	144	28
(Serbia) Jasmina Rašković (Serbia) Mateja Tadić	158	169	32
(Italy) Laura Runggatscher (Italy) Armin Egger	139	162
(Romania) Luminita Viorica Dogaru (Romania) Ion Cercel	138	150
(Denmark) Helene Holst Jensen (Denmark) Martin Folmer Hansen	145	123	18
(Czech Republic) Barbora Pýchová (Czech Republic) Michal Pytlík	136	128	25
(Estonia) Heret Ots (Estonia) Markko Abel	158	145
(North Macedonia) Mirjana Mladenovska (North Macedonia) Duško Ajdin	141	121
(Hungary) Dorottya Bordács-Szalai (Hungary) Zsolt Pákai	164	152	28
(Slovenia) Tea Repnik (Slovenia) Vid Ponebšek	150	175	26
(Austria) Dominique Rathmayer (Austria) Martin Rathmayer	134	163	17
(Croatia) Nataša Ravnić (Croatia) Bojan Vlakevski	158	152	28
(France) Margot Gribelin (France) Frédéric Koell	152	165	27
(Germany) Diana Langhammer (Germany) Marco Endres	153	137	25

Quarter-finals
(Slovakia) Jana Poliaková (Slovakia) Rostislav Gorecký	149	161
(Serbia) Jasmina Rašković (Serbia) Mateja Tadić	144	159
(Italy) Laura Runggatscher (Italy) Armin Egger	149	150
(Czech Republic) Barbora Pýchová (Czech Republic) Michal Pytlík	138	139
(Estonia) Heret Ots (Estonia) Markko Abel	160	138	27
(Hungary) Dorottya Bordács-Szalai (Hungary) Zsolt Pákai	140	141	28
(Croatia) Nataša Ravnić (Croatia) Bojan Vlakevski	165	183
(France) Margot Gribelin (France) Frédéric Koell	147	160

Semi-finals
(Slovakia) Jana Poliaková (Slovakia) Rostislav Gorecký	150	142
(Italy) Laura Runggatscher (Italy) Armin Egger	143	130
(Hungary) Dorottya Bordács-Szalai (Hungary) Zsolt Pákai	144	132
(Croatia) Nataša Ravnić (Croatia) Bojan Vlakevski	148	174

Final
(Slovakia) Jana Poliaková (Slovakia) Rostislav Gorecký	147^{29}	157^{12}
(Croatia) Nataša Ravnić (Croatia) Bojan Vlakevski	147^{31}	157^{16}
