= 2026 World Singles Ninepin Bowling Classic Championships – Men's combined =

Bowling championship

Men's combined at the 2026 World Singles Ninepin Bowling Classic Championships
- Location: Schwaz, Austria
- Dates: 1-6 June 2026
- Competitors: 65 from 16 nations
- Winning score: 1430

Medalists
gold medal	Tim Brachtel	Germany
silver medal	Lukas Huber	Austria
bronze medal	Lukas Temistokle	Austria

The men's combined event at the 2026 World Singles Ninepin Bowling Classic Championships was held in Schwaz, Austria from 1 to 6 May 2026.

It was the first time that the combined event classification was based on a player result achieved in pair rather than in sprint, together with the best score in the play-off stage of the single event.

The title was won by German Tim Brachtel. The silver medal went to Austrian Lukas Huber, while his countryman Lukas Temistokle claimed the bronze.

== Results ==
The result for the combined was the sum of pair result achieved by player and the best single start in the play-offs of single event.

Rank	Name	Country	Pair	Single play-offs					Total
Rank	Name	Country	Pair	Ro32	Ro16	1/4	1/2	F	Total
1st place, gold medalist(s)	Tim Brachtel	Germany	724	698	657	**706**	687		1430
2nd place, silver medalist(s)	Lukas Huber	Austria	712	668	**681**	662			1393
3rd place, bronze medalist(s)	Lukas Temistokle	Austria	659	**733**	632				1392
4	Šimon Magala	Slovakia	701	651	**673**	664	654	664	1374
5	Alen Kujundžić	Serbia	666	698	670	669	698	**705**	1371
6	Daniel Barth	Germany	690	**681**	660	656			1371
7	Igor Kovačić	Serbia	675	**693**	654				1368
8	Frédéric Koell	France	678	666	**684**	649			1362
9	Lukas Funk	Germany	682	**676**	655				1358
10	Žiga Požar	Slovenia	667	**683**	644				1350
11	Zsombor Zapletán	Hungary	665	**685**	664				1350
12	Marco Endres	Germany	651	653	**693**	675	631		1344
13	Ivan Petrić	Croatia	700	**638**	637				1338
14	Bojan Vlakevski	Croatia	686	**648**					1334
15	Mateja Tadić	Serbia	652	**681**					1333
16	Vid Ponebšek	Slovenia	654	**677**					1331
17	Philipp Vsetecka	Austria	652	656	**661**	639			1313
18	Erik Kuna	Slovakia	646	**662**					1308
19	Christian Wilke	Germany	637	**670**					1307
20	Uroš Stoklas	North Macedonia	654	**645**	593				1299
21	Jaroslav Hažva	Czech Republic	645	**651**					1296
22	Zoltán Móricz	Hungary	646	**649**	643				1295
23	Zsolt Pákai	Hungary	639	**650**					1289
24	Zdeněk Ransdorf	Czech Republic	667	**621**					1288
25	Jan Bína	Slovakia	649	**628**					1277
26	Miloš Simijonović	Serbia	648	**625**					1273
27	Jürgen Pointinger	Germany	653	**618**					1271
28	Ivan Totić	Croatia	652	**615**					1267
29	Bartosz Krug	Poland	670	**595**					1265
30	Jakub Cwojdziński	Poland	638	**620**					1258
31	Enzo Kempf	France	654	**592**					1246
32	Armin Egger	Italy	644	**587**					1231
33	Janže Lužan	Slovenia	636						636
34	Bojan Kličarić	Serbia	635						635
35	Matthias Zatschkowitsch	Austria	634						634
36	János Brancsek	Hungary	632						632
37	Jakub Kuryło	Poland	630						630
38	Matej Lepej	Slovenia	630						630
39	Martin Rathmayer	Austria	630						630
40	Máté Németh	Hungary	629						629
41	Bogdan Tudorie	Romania	628						628
42	Markko Abel	Estonia	628						628
43	Milan Blecha	Czech Republic	626						626
44	Pere Petrić	Croatia	625						625
45	Marijo Prljević	Bosnia and Herzegovina	624						624
46	Károly Kozma	Hungary	624						624
47	Dragan Gajin	Serbia	622						622
48	Andreas Dalvai	Italy	622						622
49	Nikola Andonovski	North Macedonia	622						622
50	Ion Cercel	Romania	616						616
51	Martin Folmer Hansen	Denmark	615						615
52	Florian Thaler	Italy	612						612
53	Michal Pytlík	Czech Republic	610						610
54	Kosta Ristevski	North Macedonia	609						609
55	Marek Sööt	Estonia	606						606
56	Petar Radović	North Macedonia	603						603
57	Oswald Kofler	Italy	602						602
58	Roberto-Daniel Laposi	Romania	601						601
59	Gabriel Zastawnik	Poland	601						601
60	Rostislav Gorecký	Slovakia	592						592
61	Aleksandar Blaževski	North Macedonia	591						591
62	Alexander Tischler	Austria	590						590
63	Duško Ajdin	North Macedonia	588						588
64	Ștefan Romeo Bălan	Romania	581						581
65	Kasper Holdgård Juul Kisum	Denmark	540						540

Key
Colour	Result
Red	Do not qualify (DNQ)
White	Do not participate (DNP)
Blank	No result (-)
Blank	Whithdrawn (WD)
Text formatting	Meaning
**Bold**	Best result
Italics	Comment
