= 2026 World Singles Ninepin Bowling Classic Championships – Men's tandem =

Men's tandem at the 2026 World Singles Ninepin Bowling Classic Championships
- Location: Schwaz, Austria
- Dates: 3 June 2026
- Competitors: 32 from 16 nations
- Teams: 16

Medalists
gold medal	Matej Lepej; Janže Lužan	Slovenia
silver medal	Pere Petrić; Ivan Totić	Croatia
bronze medal	Lukas Temistokle; Matthias Zatschkowitsch	Austria
bronze medal	Jakub Kuryło; Gabriel Zastawnik	Poland

The men's tandem event at the 2026 World Singles Ninepin Bowling Classic Championships was held in Schwaz, Austria on 3 June 2026.

Gold medal was won by Slovenians Matej Lepej and Janže Lužan, who defeated Croats Pere Petrić and Ivan Totić in the final. Bronze medals went to semi-finalists Austrians Lukas Temistokle and Matthias Zatschkowitsch, and Poles Jakub Kuryło and Gabriel Zastawnik.

In the quarterfinal, Kozma and Brancsek set a new world record of 339 in their match against Poland, despite losing the match.

== Background ==
This is the first time the events of women's and men's tandem took place at the championships. Previous editions featured only mixed tandem event with more starting places.

== Results ==
=== Starting places ===
Each nation was allocated one starting place in the women's tandem event, with a total of 16 tandems entered.

	(Austria) AUT	(Bosnia and Herzegovina) BIH	(Croatia) CRO	(Czech Republic) CZE	(Denmark) DEN	(Estonia) EST	(France) FRA	(Germany) GER	(Hungary) HUN	(Italy) ITA	(North Macedonia) MKD	(Poland) POL	(Romania) ROU	(Serbia) SRB	(Slovakia) SVK	(Slovenia) SLO	Total
Number of seeds	1	1	1	1	1	1	1	1	1	1	1	1	1	1	1	1	16

=== Schedule ===
The tandems were drawn into bouts during technical meeting before championships started.

Round of 16 - Wednesday, 3 June

Match #	Lanes	Nation 1	Player 1	Score	Nation 2	Player 2	Set 1	Set 2	SV
1st unit 11:20 (CEST)
TAM 1	1 – 2	Austria	Lukas Temistokle; Matthias Zatschkowitsch	1 - 1	Slovakia	Erik Kuna; Rostislav Gorecký	154 - 174	181 - 152	30 - 29
TAM 2	3 – 4	Germany	Jurgen Pointinger; Tim Brachtel	2 - 0	Romania	Ion Cercel; Bogdan Tudorie	149 - 134	164 - 140	—N/a
TAM 3	5 – 6	France	Fréderic Koell; Enzo Kempf	2 - 0	Denmark	Kasper Holdgård Juul Kisum; Martin Folmer Hansen	161 - 155	150 - 148	—N/a
TAM 4	7 – 8	—N/a	—N/a	Bye	Slovenia	Janže Lužan; Matej Lepej	—N/a	—N/a	—N/a
2nd unit 12:00 (CEST)
TAM 5	1 – 2	Croatia	Pere Petrić; Ivan Totić	1 - 1	Italy	Florian Thaler; Georg Plaickner	159 - 152	152 - 157	28 - 22
TAM 6	3 – 4	Estonia	Markko Abel; Marek Sööt	1 - 1	Serbia	Igor Kovačić; Alen Kujundžić	142 - 160	160 - 157	24 - 25
TAM 7	5 – 6	Czech Republic	Milan Blecha; Michal Pytlík	0 - 2	Poland	Jakub Kuryło; Gabriel Zastawnik	128 - 141	140 - 165	—N/a
TAM 8	7 – 8	North Macedonia	Andonovski Nikola; Petar Radović	0 - 2	Hungary	Károly Kozma; János Brancsek	165 - 175	142 - 155	—N/a

Quarterfinals - Wednesday, 3 June

Match #	Lanes	Nation 1	Player 1	Score	Nation 2	Player 2	Set 1	Set 2	SV
13:20 (CEST)
TAM 9	5 – 6	Austria	Lukas Temistokle; Matthias Zatschkowitsch	1 - 1	Germany	Jurgen Pointinger; Tim Brachtel	147 - 167	155 - 150	30 - 23
TAM 10	1 – 2	France	Fréderic Koell; Enzo Kempf	1 - 1	Slovenia	Janže Lužan; Matej Lepej	146 - 144	145 - 153	20 - 23
TAM 11	7 – 8	Croatia	Pere Petrić; Ivan Totić	1 - 1	Serbia	Igor Kovačić; Alen Kujundžić	154 - 159	169 - 166	26 - 25
TAM 12	3 – 4	Poland	Jakub Kuryło; Gabriel Zastawnik	1 - 1	Hungary	Károly Kozma; János Brancsek	173 - 162	146 - 177	28 - 25

Semifinals - Wednesday, 3 June

Match #	Lanes	Nation 1	Player 1	Score	Nation 2	Player 2	Set 1	Set 2	SV
14:00 (CEST)
TAM 13	7 – 8	Austria	Lukas Temistokle; Matthias Zatschkowitsch	1 - 1	Slovenia	Janže Lužan; Matej Lepej	162 - 148	155 - 160	51 - 56
TAM 14	5 – 6	Croatia	Pere Petrić; Ivan Totić	2 - 0	Poland	Jakub Kuryło; Gabriel Zastawnik	157 - 150	156 - 146	—N/a

Final - Wednesday, 3 June

Match #	Lanes	Nation 1	Player 1	Score	Nation 2	Player 2	Set 1	Set 2	SV
14:40 (CEST)
TAM 15	3 – 4	Slovenia	Janže Lužan; Matej Lepej	2 - 0	Croatia	Pere Petrić; Ivan Totić	164 - 154	167 - 153	—N/a

=== Bracket ===
First round
(Austria) Lukas Temistokle (Austria) Matthias Zatschkowitsch	154	181	30
(Slovakia) Erik Kuna (Slovakia) Rostislav Gorecky	174	152	29
(Germany) Jurgen Pointinger (Germany) Tim Brachtel	149	164
(Romania) Ion Cercel (Romania) Bogdan Tudorie	134	140
(France) Fréderic Koell (France) Enzo Kempf	161	150
(Denmark) Kasper Holdgård Juul Kisum (Denmark) Martin Folmer Hansen	155	148
Bye
(Slovenia) Janže Lužan (Slovenia) Matej Lepej
(Croatia) Pere Petrić (Croatia) Ivan Totić	159	152	28
(Italy) Florian Thaler (Italy) Georg Plaickner	152	157	22
(Estonia) Markko Abel (Estonia) Marek Soot	142	160	24
(Serbia) Igor Kovačić (Serbia) Alen Kujundžić	160	157	25
(Czech Republic) Milan Blecha (Czech Republic) Michal Pytlik	128	140
(Poland) Jakub Kuryło (Poland) Gabriel Zastawnik	141	165
(North Macedonia) Andonovski Nikola (North Macedonia) Petar Radović	165	142
(Hungary) Károly Kozma (Hungary) János Brancsek	175	155

Quarter-finals
(Austria) Lukas Temistokle (Austria) Matthias Zatschkowitsch	147	155	30
(Germany) Jurgen Pointinger (Germany) Tim Brachtel	167	150	23
(France) Fréderic Koell (France) Enzo Kempf	146	145	20
(Slovenia) Janže Lužan (Slovenia) Matej Lepej	144	153	23
(Croatia) Pere Petrić (Croatia) Ivan Totić	154	169	26
(Serbia) Igor Kovačić (Serbia) Alen Kujundžić	159	166	25
(Poland) Jakub Kuryło (Poland) Gabriel Zastawnik	173	146	28
(Hungary) Károly Kozma (Hungary) János Brancsek	162	177	25

Semi-finals
(Austria) Lukas Temistokle (Austria) Matthias Zatschkowitsch	162	155	51
(Slovenia) Janže Lužan (Slovenia) Matej Lepej	148	160	56
(Croatia) Pere Petrić (Croatia) Ivan Totić	157	156
(Poland) Jakub Kuryło (Poland) Gabriel Zastawnik	150	146

Final
(Slovenia) Janže Lužan (Slovenia) Matej Lepej	164	167
(Croatia) Pere Petrić (Croatia) Ivan Totić	154	153
