= Joseph Messner =

Austrian composer and priest (1893–1969)

Joseph Messner (27 February 1893 – 21/23 February 1969 (Note: Modern sources report Messner's exact death date inconsistely. Grove Music Online gives 23 February, while the Arbeitsschwerpunkt Salzburger Musikgeschichte records 21 February.)) was an Austrian composer of contemporary classical music and priest. He was among the most important 20th-century composers active in Salzburg.

== Life ==
Joseph Messner, brother of the social ethicist Johannes Messner, was born in Schwaz/Tyrol as the son of a miner (in the Silberbergwerk Schwaz) and a tobacco worker. He received music lessons in singing, violin, piano and organ at an early age. At the age of twelve he moved to Salzburg in 1905 and from then on received his musical education at the Kapellhaus, Sigmund-Haffner-Gasse 20, then at the Mozarteum. After graduating from the Privatgymnasium Borromäum he studied theology and was ordained a priest in 1916. Later he trained in Munich under Friedrich Klose (composition) and continued studying the organ with Josef Gabriel Rheinberger's student Josef Becht.

In the 1920s, Messner enjoyed great success as a composer, especially in Germany. "Joseph Messner Organ Festivals" were held in several cities, and in Duisburg the "Joseph Messner Days" were held in 1924, when his Sinfonietta for piano was premiered. Archbishop Ignatius Rieder appointed him as second cathedral organist at the Salzburg Cathedral in 1922, but appointed and paid him as a cooperator of Pfarrwerfen. In 1926, he finally became Domkapellmeister in Salzburg - a position he held until his death.

In the 1930s, Messner smoothed out his otherwise revolutionary tonal language by replacing his "dissonant counterpoint" with the "melodious sounds of the tonic triad". He apparently made this change under the impression of "Greater German cultural ideals". In fact, unlike his brother Johannes Messner, Joseph Messner supported the Anschluss to the German Reich.

In 1934, he took part in the film Das unsterbliche Lied, which tells a Christmas story around the song Silent Night.

After the war, Messner tried to build on his earlier successes, but he failed. In his career, he felt ignored or thwarted on several occasions, for example in 1946 when he was appointed rector of the Mozarteum Academy of Music and at his cathedral concerts, which were removed from the official festival programme in 1968.

On 20 August 1968, he was awarded an honorary doctorate from the University of Salzburg.

Messner died unexpectedly in 1969 in his family home in St. Jakob am Thurn at the age of 75, where he had lived for several decades with the singer Evi Klemens. He died on either 21 February or 23 February.

The musicologist Cliff Eisen described Messner as among the most important 20th-century composers active in Salzburg.

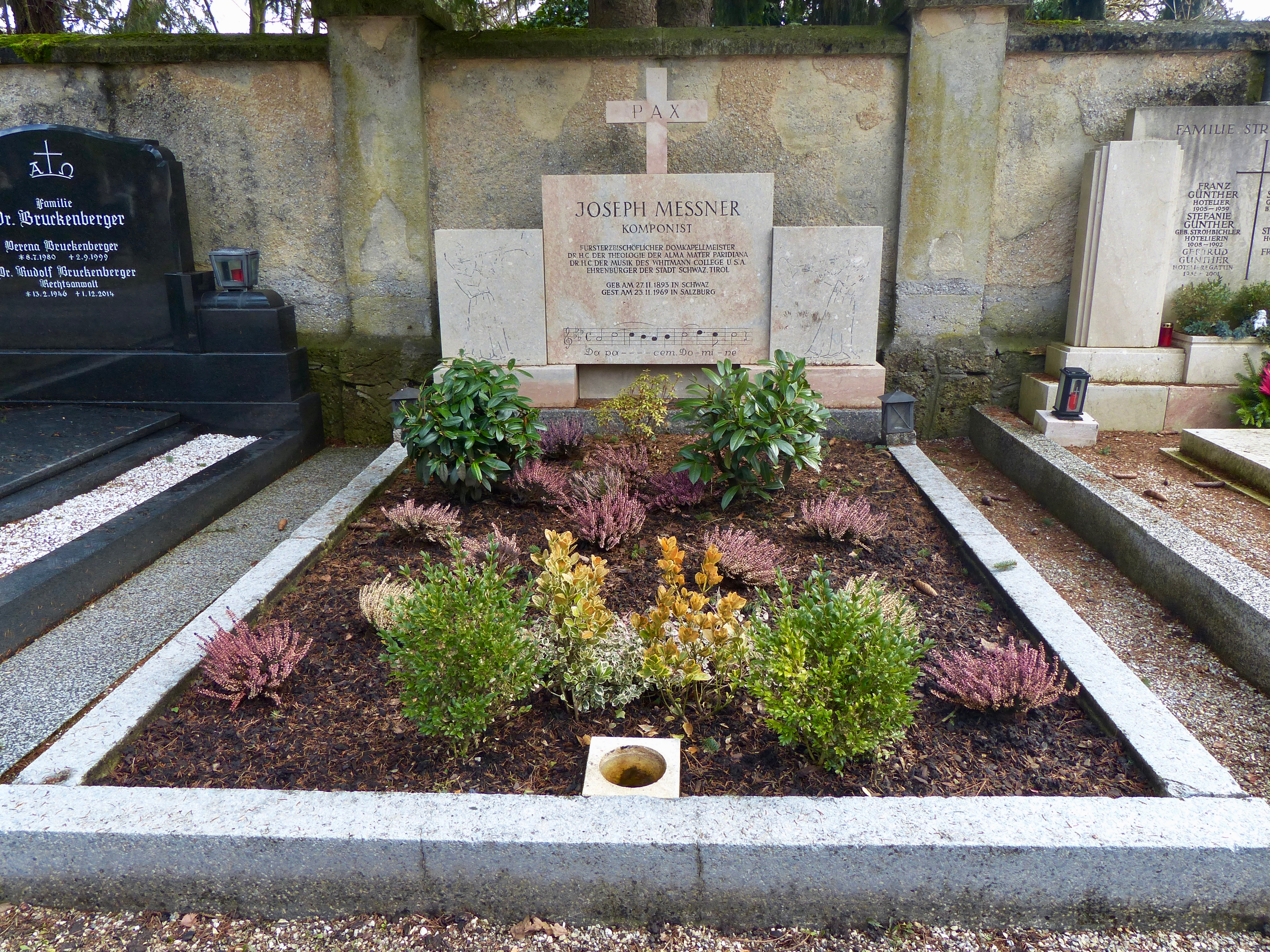
Grave of Joseph Messner, Salzburger Kommunalfriedhof

== Œuvre and stylistics ==
Messner left behind an extensive body of work, including the Salzburger Festspielfanfare, the long version of which was used as an acoustic signet on all radio broadcasts of the Salzburg Festival until 1980; the Bombenmesse, commemorating the destruction of Salzburg Cathedral in 1944, the composer pretending to have witnessed it himself on the cathedral organ; numerous wind fanfares. In addition, he composed three symphonies (in C minor, F major and A major), several instrumental and orchestral works (including the Salzburg Suite, which describes as a programme various sights in Salzburg), four operas (including one about the person of Esther), numerous Lieder and a large number of sacred works (masses, proprium music, motets, sacred songs, etc.). As an organ virtuoso, he was internationally recognised, although - similar to Bruckner - he composed only a few organ works, but impressed with his improvisational artistry in his organ concerts. Today, only a few recordings of Messner's improvisations have survived (Archive of the Research Institute for Salzburg Music History at the Department of Music and Dance Studies at the University of Salzburg).

== Work ==
=== Lieder ===
Numerous solo Lieder with piano or organ accompaniment

- "34 Songs" in the archive of the Salzburg Museum, archive no. N 16
- Blumenlieder, op. 1 (1916), song cycle for voice and piano, poems by Johannes Messner alias "Ilse Planke"
- Amsellieder, op. 2 (1916), song cycle for medium voice and piano, poems by Johannes Messner alias "Ilse Planke" (Verlag Anton Böhm & Sohn, Augsburg, No. 6358)
- Friendship Songs, op. 3 (1917), song cycle for high voice and piano, poems by Johannes Messner alias "St. P., Munich" (published by Anton Böhm & Sohn, Augsburg, no. 6359)
- Two Legends of the Virgin Mary, op. 8 (1921), for medium voice, string quartet, harp and horn (Verlag Doblinger Wien, D. 6364)
- Five symphonic songs for soprano and orchestra, op. 24 (1926) after rhapsodic poems by Wilhelm Hendel (published by Universal-Edition, 1927), No. 9545 (material on loan)
- Three Songs for Baritone and Orchestra, op. 43 (1936) after poems by Leo Maasfeld (Publisher Anton Böhm & Sohn, Augsburg, 1936, No. 9025)
- Erfüllung, op. 64 (1948), for soprano and string quartet, cycle after mystic poems by Novalis, Otto Julius Bierbaum and Johannes vom Kreuz, "dedicated to Irmgard Seefried and the Schneiderhan Quartet"
- Three Songs, op. 69 (1952), for 3 male voices and string quartet, No. 1 with soprano solo
- Two songs after Wilhelm Busch, op. 70 (1952), for tenor and piano

=== Works for wind instruments ===
- Numerous fanfares for brass (the most famous of which is the Salzburg Festival fanfare): e.g.

Small" festival fanfare, op. 36/b (1933)

Fanfare in C
Fanfares for the radio
Feeder fanfare

Festival Fanfare, op. 55/1 (1936), for the Salzburg Festival

Paracelsus Fanfare, op. 55/2 (1941)
Prince Eugene battle cry, op. 55/3 (1941)
Great Mozart Fanfare, op. 55/4 (1941)
Canons' Ink, op. 55/10 (1929)

("Monuments of Music in Salzburg, Volume 6 - Joseph Messner, Wind Fanfares - presented by Armin Kircher", Selke-Verlag Salzburg, 1994)

- Prelude in A flat minor and fugue in A flat major for winds and percussion, op. 44 (1936)
- Symphonic Festival Music, op. 45 a (1936) for wind instruments, timpani and organ (published by Anton Böhm & Sohn, Augsburg, 1937, no. 9082)

=== Masses and other sacred works ===
- Mass in D for choir and organ, op. 4, 1918
- Missa poëtica, op. 9, 1921 (Publisher Anton Böhm & Sohn, Augsburg, 1923, no. 6280)
- Mass in B flat for soprano solo, choir and wind sextet ("Salzburger Dommesse"), op. 29, 1931 (published by Anton Böhm & Sohn, Augsburg, 1931, no. 7778)
- Te Deum for soli S + bar, four to eight-part choir, wind septet and timpani, op. 38, 1935 (published by Anton Böhm & Sohn, Augsburg, 1935, no. 8379)
- Mass for soprano solo, 3-part female choir and organ (harmonium), op. 40 (1935) (Publisher Anton Böhm & Sohn, Augsburg, No. 10720)
- Festive Mass in C for 5-part choir à cappella, op. 42 (1935) Published by Anton Böhm & Sohn, Augsburg, 1935, no. 8372
- Mass in G, opus 46, for mixed choir and organ, 1937 (published by Anton Böhm & Sohn, Augsburg, 1937, no. 8702)
- Mass in A for Choir and Strings, op. 66, 1949 (published by Anton Böhm & Sohn, Augsburg, 1960, no. 10723)
- Great Mass in E for four solo voices, choir and orchestra, "Bombenmesse", op. 83, 1959, composed for the restoration of the Salzburg Cathedral (the Agnus Dei contains an onomatopoeic depiction of the destruction of Salzburg Cathedral by aerial bombs on 16 October 1944; at that time, Joseph Messner was not sitting at the organ in the cathedral, as he always claimed)
- Further numerous proprios and motets ("The proprium is the lyrical side idea to the drama of the mass. I have entrusted many of my most beautiful melodies to his motets". Quote from Joseph Messner)

=== Choral pieces ===
- Das Leben, Symphonic choral work op. 13 (1924) for soprano solo, 4-voice female choir, piano, harp and strings after poems by Novalis (1772–1801)
- Die vier letzten Dinge, choral symphony op. 27 (1931) for solos, choir and orchestra after the poem by Angelus Silesius (recte Johann Scheffler, 1624–1677) "Die sinnliche Beschreibung der vier letzten Dinge".
- Der Himmel hängt voller Geigen, op. 48 (1939) for women's (boys') choir and orchestra based on texts from the song collection Des Knaben Wunderhorn by Achim von Arnim (Verlag Universal-Edition Vienna (1939) No. 11.145, material on loan)
- Deutschlands Ehre, op. 59 (1943) for choir, winds and organ
- Peter Mayr, Wirt an der Mahr, Ballade op. 82 (1958) for soloists A + B, 6-part choir SATB and orchestra

=== Stage works ===
- Esther, Biblical opera in one act (10 scenes), op. 6 (1921), poem by Johannes Messner after the biblical book Esther
- Stage music for the Jedermann, 1926 and 1960 (op. 76) after the production by William Dieterle
- Deutsches Recht, Opera, op. 31 (1932), dramatic legend in 3 acts (5 scenes) after a ballad by Enrica Handel-Mazzetti, libretto by Oskar Gunther and Karl Neumayr
- Ines, opera, op. 35 (1933), musical drama in 3 acts (5 scenes), libretto by Karl Neumayr and Joseph Messner after the play "Toni" by Theodor Körner
- Agnes Bernauer (Der Engel von Augsburg), opera, op. 39 (1936), opera in 3 acts (5 scenes) after motives of Friedrich Hebbel, Libretto by Karl Neumayr

=== Orchestral work ===
- Symphony No. 1 in C minor, op. 5 (1920)
- Scherzo fugato for large orchestra, op. 5a (from the 1st Symphony), published by Doblinger Wien (material on loan)
- Symphony No. 2 in F (Savonarola), op. 21 (1925)
- Salzburger Suite for Orchestra, op. 51 (1940/41), in five movements about famous Salzburg sights:

1st Festung Hohensalzburg - Paul Hofhaimer "Choral für den Salzburger Stier" (1538)

2nd Hellbrunner Wasserspiele- Johann Ernst Eberlin "Choral für die Wasserorgel" (1770)

3rd Friedhof von St. Peter – Michael Haydn "Hier liegt vor deiner Majestät"

4th Untersberger Zwerge - Lied "Mei Hoamat, mei Salzburg"

5th Salzburg Cathedral - Wolfgang Amadeus Mozart's Ave verum corpus

- Rondo giocoso for large orchestra, op. 54 (1941), (Publisher Universal-Edition, No. UE 34232, material on loan)
- Symphony No. 3 in A major, op. 58 (1945)

=== Instrumental concerts ===
- Sinfonietta op. 10 (1923) in one movement, for piano and orchestra with mezzo-soprano solo (piano concerto) (Verlag Doblinger Wien, Klavierauszug, Leihmaterial, D. 6367)
- Concerto for violin and orchestra, op. 61 (1947)
- Concerto for violoncello and orchestra, op. 80 (1954)

=== Piano and organ works ===
- Phantasie and Fugue in B for piano, op. 14 (1924)(Verlag Doblinger Wien, 1924, Klavierwerke, 01281)
- Romance for the piano, op. 15 (1924) (Verlag Doblinger Wien, 1924, Klavierwerke, 01281)
- Improvisation on a theme by Bruckner for organ, op. 19 (1924) (Publisher Universal-Edition, 1924, No. 7711)
- Paraphrase on Haydn's folk hymn for organ, op. 28 (1931), for the inauguration of the Kufstein Hero Organ on 3 May 1931 (Publisher Anton Böhm & Sohn, Augsburg, 1931, no. 7776)
- Suite for organ, op. 33 (1932) (Published by Anton Böhm & Sohn, Augsburg, 1932, no. 7958)
- Sonatine in bb for piano, op. 62 (1947)(Verlag Doblinger Wien, 1924, Klavierwerke, 01281 and in issue 4, "Die Sonatine", D. 8183)

=== Other work ===
- String quartet in G minor, op. 78 (1953)
