= Michael Steinlechner =

Austrian footballer

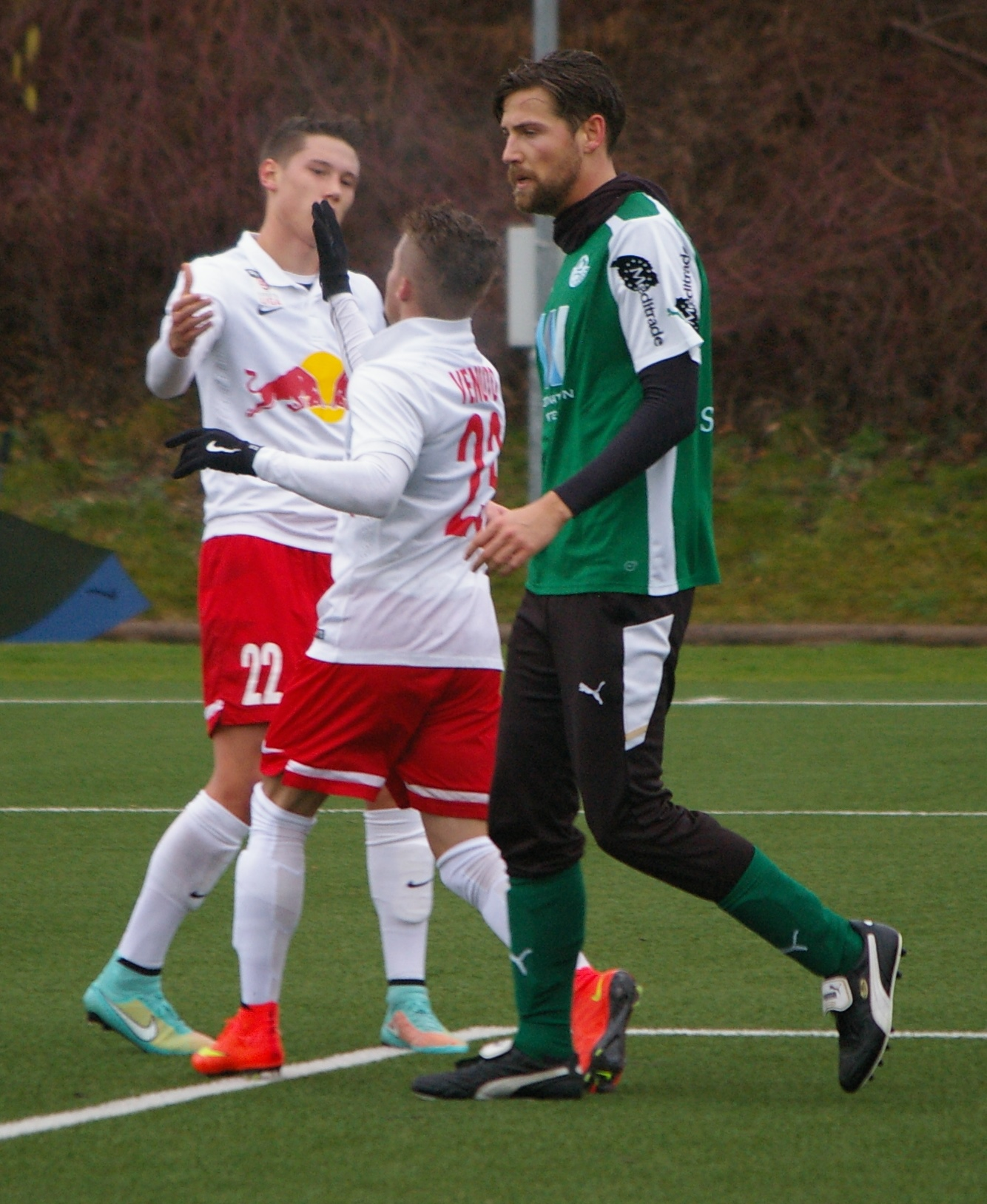
- FC Liefering v. WSG Wattens, 2015

Personal information
- Full name: Michael Steinlechner
- Date of birth: 27 April 1987 (age 39)
- Place of birth: Schwaz, Austria
- Height: 1.85 m (6 ft 1 in)
- Position: Centre back

Team information
- Current team: SV Fügen
- Number: 3

Youth career
- 1994–2004: WSG Wattens

Senior career*
Years	Team	Apps	(Gls)
2004–2006	SC Schwaz		
2006–2018	WSG Wattens	264	(27)
2013–2014	→ Wacker Innsbruck (loan)	2	(0)
2018–	SV Fügen		
- * Club domestic league appearances and goals as of 22:49, 5 September 2019 (UTC)

Michael Steinlechner (born 27 April 1987) is an Austrian footballer who plays for SV Fügen.
