= Burg Freundsberg =

Castle in Austria

Coordinates: 47°20′36″N 11°43′03″E

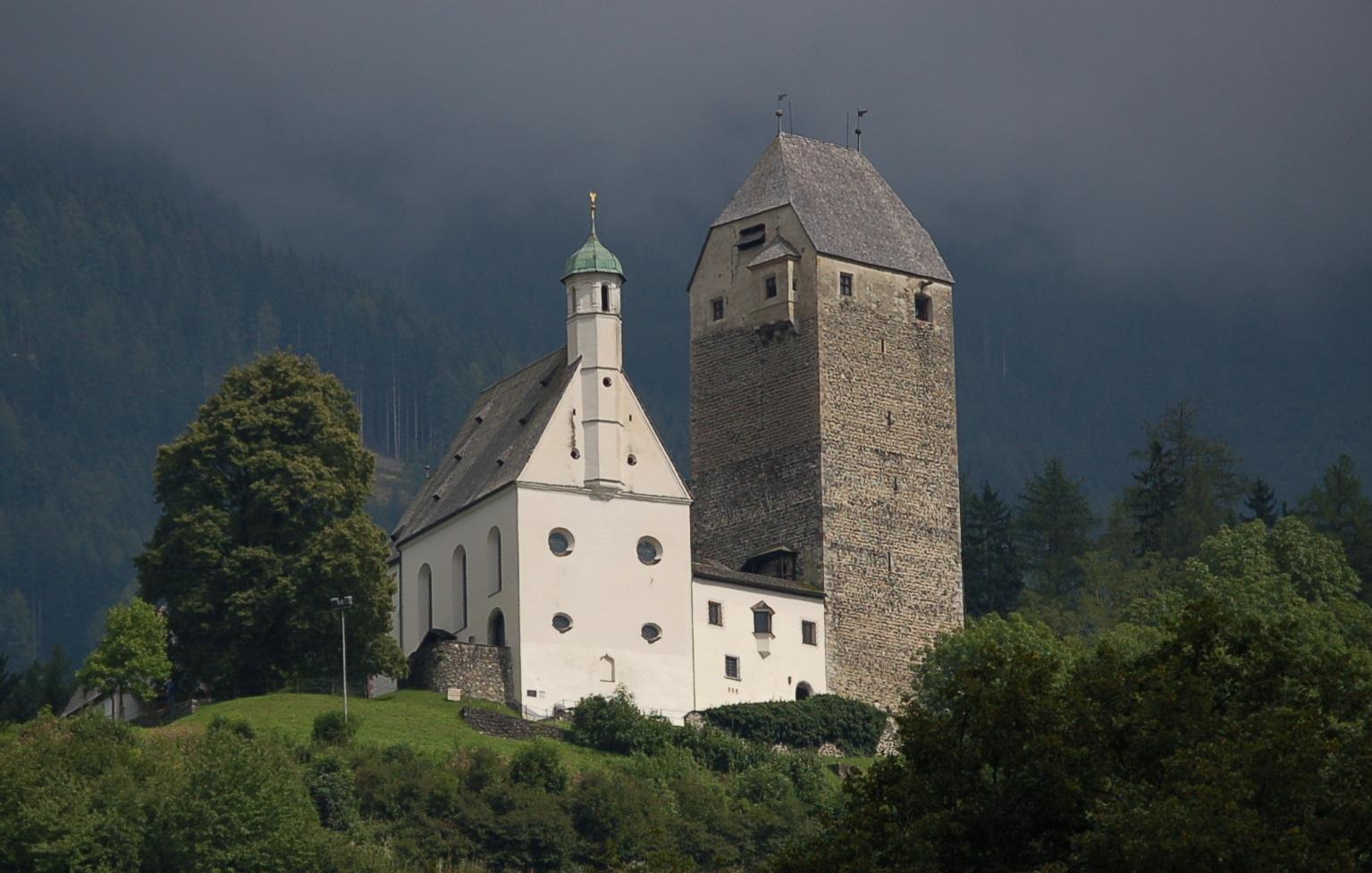
Castle Freundsberg seen from below the Freundsberg (literally "friend mountain") as of 16 August 2008.

Burg Freundsberg is a castle in Tyrol, Austria, that was constructed in the year of 1150 by the lords of Freundsberg. Burg Freundsberg is 675 metres (2,215 ft) above sea level. Originally the castle consisted out of a single keep, which is still intact up to this date. The chapel next to it was built afterwards in the year 1177. In 1467 the castle was sold to Archduke Sigismund of Austria, who rebuilt the castle and called it Sigismundruh for the duration of his reign.

From 1634 to 1637 on, the castle was retrofitted as a "castle church" or Schlosskirche. (Not to be confused with the All Saints' Church, Wittenberg, which is also referred to as a Schlosskirche.) After passing to several other owners from 1812 on, Castle Freundsberg became a property of the municipality of Schwaz. They restored the castle from 1966 onwards.

Since 1948 the castle is a museum where the history of the city Schwaz and the silver mining industry in this region is documented.

== See also ==
- List of castles in Austria
