= Albert Jäger =

Austrian priest and historian (1801–1891)

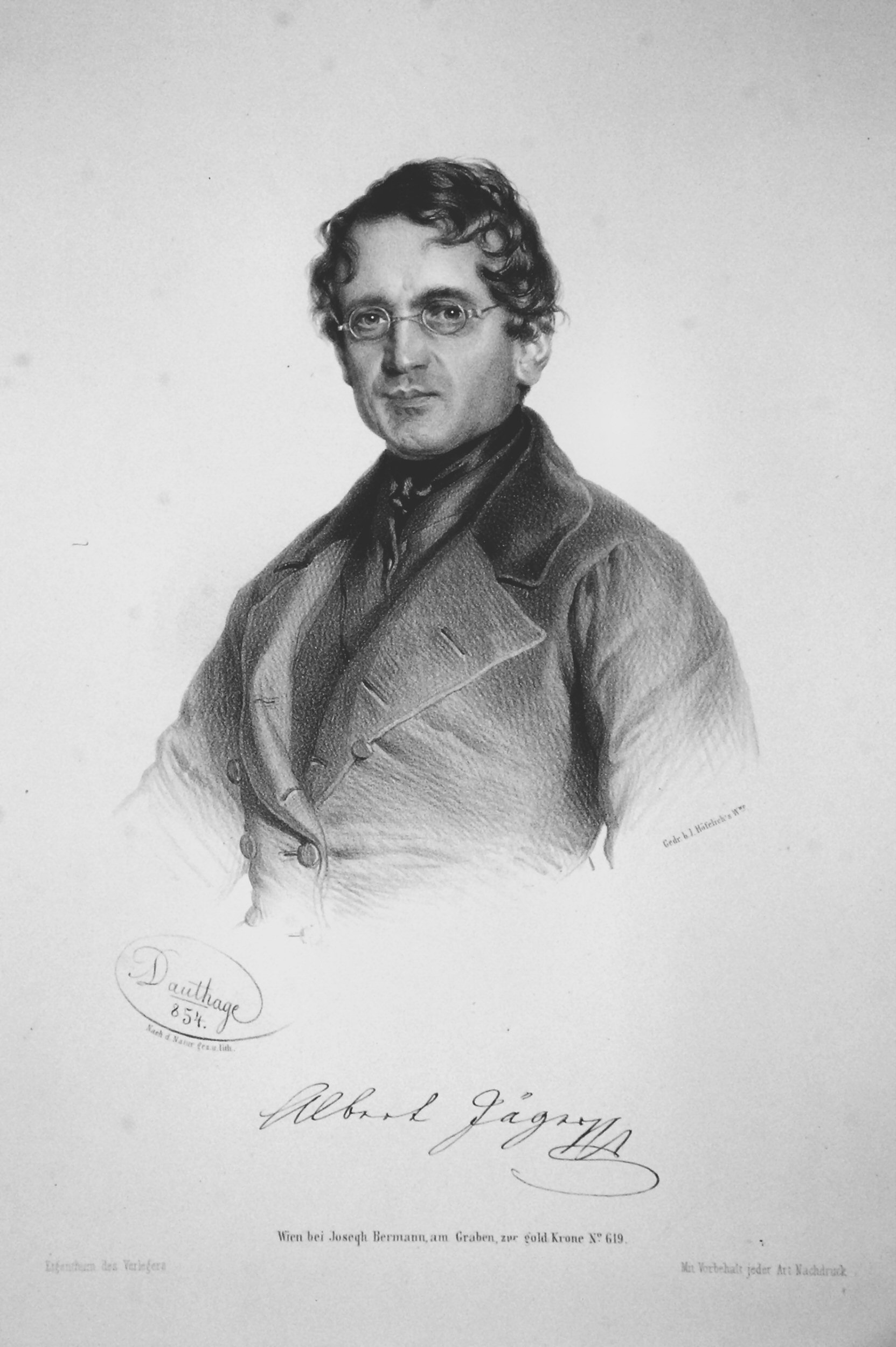
Albert Jäger (1801–1891)

Albert Jäger (8 December 1801 in Schwaz – 10 December 1891 in Innsbruck) was an Austrian priest and historian who specialized in Tyrolean history.

From 1826 he studied theology in Brixen, becoming ordained as a priest in 1829. In 1846 he was appointed professor of universal and Austrian state history at the University of Innsbruck. In 1849 he became director of the Benedictine gymnasium in Merano — two years later, being appointed professor of Austrian history at the University of Vienna.

In 1854 he founded the Instituts für österreichische Geschichtsforschung (Institute for Austrian Historical Research), serving as its first director up until 1869. From 1867 to 1871, he was a member of the Reichsrat.

== Selected works ==
- Tirol und der baierisch-französische Einfall im Jahre 1703 (1844) – Tirol and the Bavarian-French incident of 1703.
- Zur Vorgeschichte des Jahres 1809 in Tirol, (1852) – Tyrolean history prior to 1809.
- Beiträge zur österreichischen Geschichte (1856) – Contribution to Austrian history.
- Der Streit des Cardinals Nikolaus von Cues mit dem Herzog Sigmund von Tirol, 2 volumes (1861) – The controversy of Cardinal Nicholas of Cusa with Duke Sigismund of Tyrol.
- Kaiser Joseph II und Leopold II.: Reform und Gegenreform 1780–1792 (1867) – Holy Roman Emperors Joseph II and Leopold II, etc.
- Die Priester-Verfolgung in Tirol von 1806 bis 1809, (1868) – "Priest-tracking" in Tyrol from 1806 to 1809.
- Geschichte der landständischen Verfassung Tirols, 2 volumes (1881–1885) – History of the Tyrolean Assembly Constitution.
