= 2024 World Singles Ninepin Bowling Classic Championships =

European bowling competition

9th World Singles Ninepin Bowling Classic Championships
- Host city: Brezno
- Country: Slovakia
- Nations: 15
- Sport: 9-pins
- Events: 7
- Opening: May 27, 2024
- Closing: June 1, 2024
- Website: Official Site

Location in Europe
Location in Slovakia

The 2024 World Singles Ninepin Bowling Classic Championships was the ninth edition of the world singles championships and held in Brezno, Slovakia, from 27 May to 1 June 2024.

In the men's singles, Tim Brachtel (Germany) claimed the title, ending three consecutive editions of dominance by Vilmoš Zavarko, who missed the championships due to injury. The gold medal in the sprint event was won by another German, Christian Wilke, while the combined title went to Austriaan Matthias Zatschkowitsch.

In the women's singles, Natálie Bínová (Czechia) won the gold medal. The sprint title was secured by Alina Dollheimer (Germany), while the combined event was won by Croatian Amela Nicol Imširović.

The mixed tandem competition was won by the Croats Venesa Bogdanović and Alen Kujundžić.

== Participants ==
Below is the list of countries who participated in the championships.

- Austria
- Croatia
- Czech Republic
- Denmark
- Estonia
- France
- Germany
- Hungary
- Italy
- North Macedonia
- Poland
- Romania
- Serbia
- Slovakia
- Slovenia

== Schedule ==
Seven events will be held.

All times are local (UTC+2).

Date	Time	Event
27 May 2024	09:30	Single qualifications
28 May 2024	09:00	Single qualifications
28 May 2024	18:00	Mixed tandem 1. round
29 May 2024	09:00	Sprints 1. round
29 May 2024	13:10	Mixed tandem finals
29 May 2024	16:40	Sprints finals
30 May 2024	10:00	Single finals
31 May 2024	09:00	Single finals
1 June 2024	10:30	Single finals

== Medal summary ==
=== Medal table ===
* Host nation (Slovakia)

Rank	Nation	Gold	Silver	Bronze	Total
1	Germany (GER)	3	2	5	10
2	Croatia (CRO)	2	1	3	6
3	Austria (AUT)	1	2	3	6
4	Czech Republic (CZE)	1	1	0	2
5	Hungary (HUN)	0	1	0	1
6	Estonia (EST)	0	0	1	1
Totals (6 entries)		7	7	12	26

=== Men ===
Event	Gold	Silver	Bronze
Single	Tim Brachtel (GER)	Philipp Vsetecka (AUT)	Hrvoje Marinović (CRO) Matthias Zatschkowitsch (AUT)
Sprint	Christian Wilke (GER)	Zsombor Zapletán (HUN)	Hrvoje Marinović (CRO) Mario Nüßlein (GER)
Combined	Matthias Zatschkowitsch (AUT)	Jarolsav Hažva (CZE)	Christian Wilke (GER)

=== Women ===
Event	Gold	Silver	Bronze
Single	Natálie Bínová (CZE)	Nataša Ravnić (CRO)	Venesa Bogdanović (CRO) Julia Huber (AUT)
Sprint	Alina Dollheimer (GER)	Julia Huber (AUT)	Luisa Ebert (GER) Heret Ots (EST)
Combined	Amela Nicol Imširović (CRO)	Alina Dollheimer (GER)	Bianca Golla (GER)

=== Mixed ===
Event	Gold	Silver	Bronze
Mixed tandem	Venesa Bogdanović; Alen Kujundžić; Croatia	Celine Zenker; Manuel Lallinger; Germany	Alina Dollheimer; Lukas Funk; Germany Monika Nguyen; Martin Rathmayer; Austria
