= 2026 World Singles Ninepin Bowling Classic Championships =

European bowling competition

10th World Singles Ninepin Bowling Classic Championships
- Host city: Schwaz
- Country: Austria
- Nations: 16
- Sport: 9-pins
- Events: 11
- Opening: May 30, 2026
- Closing: June 6, 2026
- Website: Official Site

Location in Europe
Location in Austria

The 2026 World Singles Ninepin Bowling Classic Championships was the tenth edition of the world singles championships and held in Schwaz, Austria, from 30 May to 6 June 2026.

In the men’s events, the single title was won by Alen Kujundžić of Serbia. Daniel Barth of Germany claimed the sprint gold medal and, together with Lukas Funk, also won the men’s pair event. The combined title went to Tim Brachtel of Germany, while the men’s tandem competition was won by Matej Lepej and Janže Lužan of Slovenia. In the women’s events, Anja Vicković of Croatia won the single title. Nikola Portyšová of Czechia became world champion in the sprint, while the combined event was won by Boglárka Hari of Hungary, who also, together with Anita Sáfrány, claimed the women’s pair title. The women’s tandem gold medal went to Germany’s Sarah Conrad and Luisa Ebert. In the mixed tandem event, the world title was won by Croats - Nataša Ravnić and Bojan Vlakevski.

== Participants ==
Below is the list of countries who participated in the championships.

- Austria
- Bosnia and Herzegovina
- Croatia
- Czech Republic
- Denmark
- Estonia
- France
- Germany
- Hungary
- Italy
- North Macedonia
- Poland
- Romania
- Serbia
- Slovakia
- Slovenia

== Schedule ==
Eleven events will be held.

All times are local (UTC+2).

Date	Time	Event
30 May 2026	20:00	Opening ceremony
31 May 2026	09:30	Women's pair
1 June 2026	09:00	Men's pair
2 June 2026	10:00	Women's & Men's sprint
3 June 2026	10:00	Women's & Men's tandem
3 June 2026	15:30	Mixed tandem
4 June 2026	10:00	Single 1. round
5 June 2026	10:00	Single 2. round
5 June 2026	16:00	Single quarterfinals
6 June 2026	10:00	Single semifinals
6 June 2026	11:45	Single finals

== Medal summary ==
=== Medal table ===
* Host nation (Austria)

Rank	Nation	Gold	Silver	Bronze	Total
1	Germany (GER)	4	3	3	10
2	Croatia (CRO)	2	2	4	8
3	Hungary (HUN)	2	0	3	5
4	Serbia (SRB)	1	1	0	2
5	Czech Republic (CZE)	1	0	2	3
6	Slovenia (SLO)	1	0	1	2
7	Austria (AUT)*	0	3	3	6
8	Slovakia (SVK)	0	2	0	2
9	Italy (ITA)	0	0	1	1
9	Poland (POL)	0	0	1	1
Totals (10 entries)		11	11	18	40

=== Men ===
Event	Gold	Silver	Bronze
Single	Alen Kujundžić (SRB)	Šimon Magala (SVK)	Tim Brachtel (GER) Marco Endres (GER)
Sprint	Daniel Barth (GER)	Igor Kovačić (SRB)	Zdenĕk Ransdorf (CZE) Žiga Požar (SLO)
Combined	Tim Brachtel (GER)	Lukas Huber (AUT)	Lukas Temistokle (AUT)
Pair	Germany; Daniel Barth; Lukas Funk	Austria; Lukas Huber; Philipp Vsetecka	Germany; Tim Brachtel; Christian Wilke
Tandem	Slovenia; Matej Lepej; Janže Lužan	Croatia; Pere Petrić; Ivan Totić	Austria; Lukas Temistokle; Matthias Zatschkowitsch Poland; Jakub Kuryło; Gabriel Zastawnik

=== Women ===
Event	Gold	Silver	Bronze
Single	Anja Vicković (CRO)	Bianca Golla (GER)	Paula Polanšćak (CRO) Anita Sáfrány (HUN)
Sprint	Nikola Portyšová (CZE)	Julia Huber (AUT)	Amela Nicol Imširović (CRO) Jana Braunová (CZE)
Combined	Boglárka Hári (HUN)	Bianca Golla (GER)	Paula Polanšćak (CRO)
Pair	Hungary; Boglárka Hari; Anita Sáfrány	Germany; Luisa Ebert; Bianca Golla	Croatia; Nataša Ravnić; Anja Vicković
Tandem	Germany; Sarah Conrad; Luisa Ebert	Croatia; Paula Polanšćak; Anja Vicković	Austria; Dominique Rathmayer; Lisa Vsetecka Hungary; Boglárka Hari; Anita Sáfrány

=== Mixed ===
Event	Gold	Silver	Bronze
Mixed tandem	Croatia; Nataša Ravnić; Bojan Vlakevski	Slovakia; Jana Poliaková; Rostislav Gorecký	Hungary; Dorottya Bordács-Szalai; Zsolt Pákai Italy; Laura Runggatscher; Armin Egger
