= Schwaz =

- Municipality
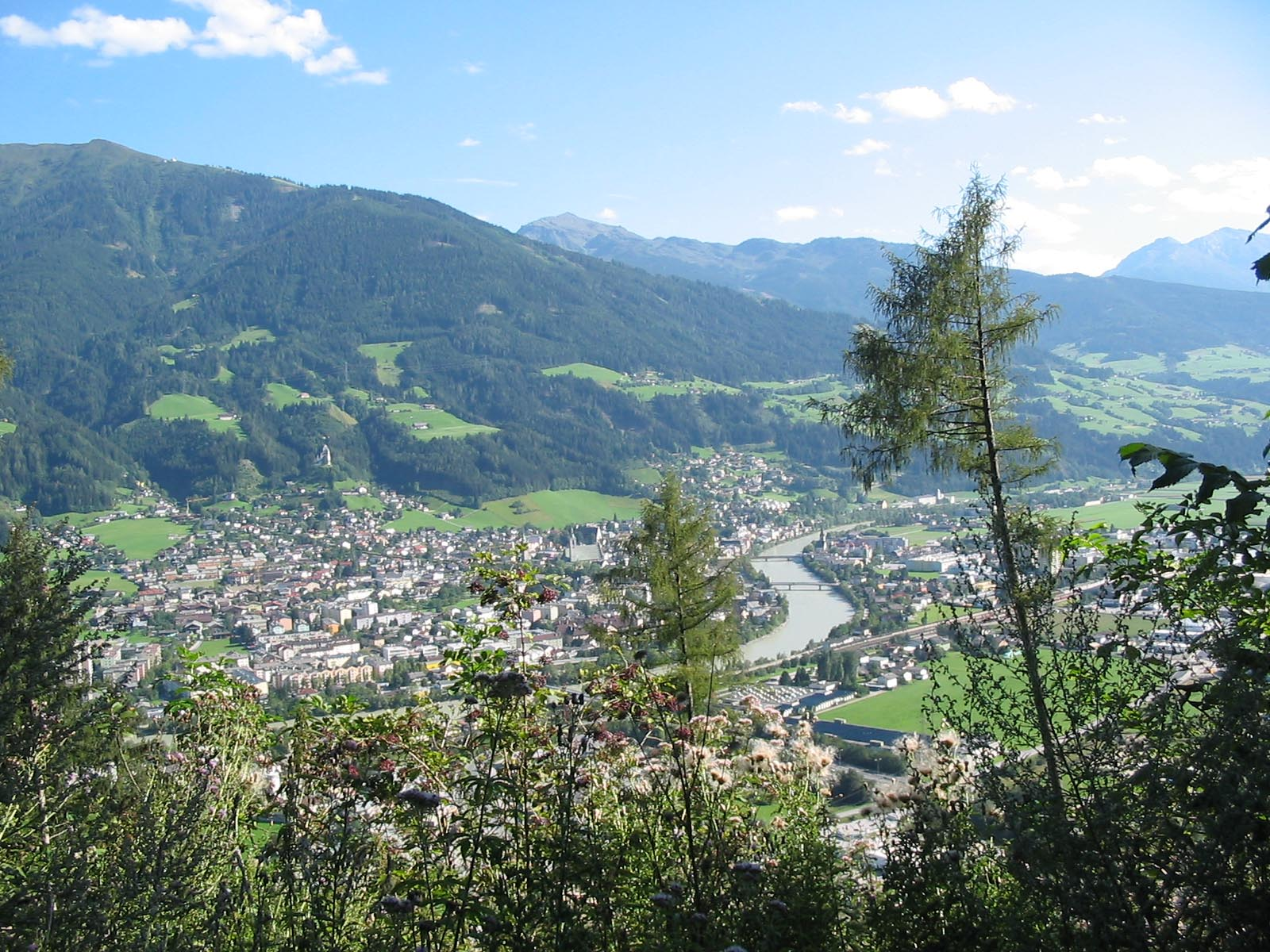
- Schwaz seen from the northeast

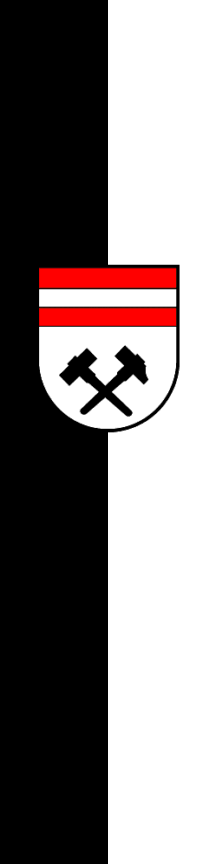
- Flag Coat of arms

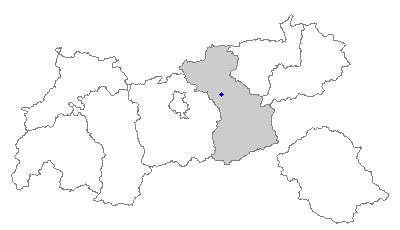
- Location in Tyrol

- Location within Austria Schwaz (Austria)
- Coordinates: 47°21′00″N 11°42′00″E
- Country: Austria
- State: Tyrol
- District: Schwaz

Government
  - Mayor: Victoria Weber (Team Zukunft)

Area
  - Total: 20.21 km^{2} (7.80 sq mi)
- Elevation: 545 m (1,788 ft)

Population (2021)
  - Total: 13,810
  - Density: 683.3/km^{2} (1,770/sq mi)
- Time zone: UTC+1 (CET)
  - Summer (DST): UTC+2 (CEST)
- Postal code: 6130
- Area code: 05242
- Vehicle registration: SZ
- Website: www.schwaz.at

Schwaz (German pronunciation: [ˈʃvaːts]) is a city in the Austrian state of Tyrol. It is the administrative center of the Schwaz district. Schwaz is located in the lower Inn valley.

== Location ==
Schwaz lies in the middle of the Lower Inn Valley at the foot of the Kellerjoch and Eiblschrofen mountains. It is located approximately 30 km (19 mi) east of Innsbruck.

The city covers an area of 20.17 km^{2} (7.79 sq mi).

Neighbouring communities include: Buch bei Jenbach, Fügenberg, Gallzein, Pill, Stans, and Vomp.

== History ==
Schwaz has been firstly mentioned as „Sûates“ in deed dating back to 930–1. The Counts of Tyrol guarded Schwaz from nearby Burg Freundsberg. At the town's height during the 15th and 16th centuries, it was an important silver mining center, providing mineral wealth for both the Fugger banking family and, through them, for the Austrian emperors. During this period, its population of about 20,000 inhabitants made it the second largest city in the Austrian Empire, after Vienna.

Schwaz received its city rights in 1898 by Emperor Franz Joseph I of Austria.

== Population ==
Historical population
Year	Pop.	±%
1869	4,813	—
1880	5,124	+6.5%
1890	5,888	+14.9%
1900	6,545	+11.2%
1910	7,385	+12.8%
1923	7,033	−4.8%
1934	7,738	+10.0%
1939	7,523	−2.8%
1951	8,898	+18.3%
1961	9,455	+6.3%
1971	10,298	+8.9%
1981	10,929	+6.1%
1991	11,839	+8.3%
2001	12,212	+3.2%
2011	11,994	−1.8%

== Economy ==
Three large industrial companies have their headquarters in Schwaz:

- Tyrolit – a globally active producer of bonded abrasives
- Adler Lacke – a family-run producer of coating systems
- DAKA – a regional waste management company

== Notable people ==
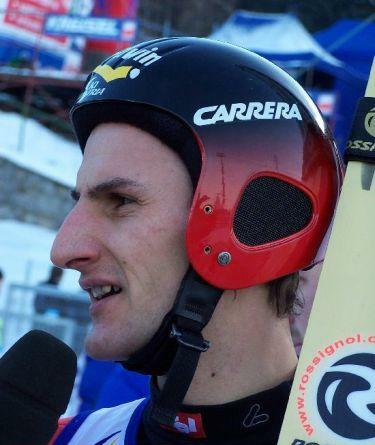
Martin Hoellwarth, 2004

- Georg Scherer (1540 – 1605), a Roman Catholic pulpit orator and controversialist.
- Albert Jäger (1801–1891), an Austrian priest and historian who specialized in Tyrolean history.
- Maximilian Joseph von Tarnóczy (1806–1876), an Austrian Cardinal and Archbishop of Salzburg
- Cordula Wöhler (1845–1916), a German author of Christian poetry and hymns, lived locally from 1881
- Joseph Messner (1893–1969), an Austrian musician, composer and priest.
- Hans Köchler (born 1948), a retired professor of philosophy at the University of Innsbruck

=== Sport ===
- Traudl Hecher (1943–2023), was an Austrian World Cup alpine ski racer and Olympic medalist.
- Martin Höllwarth (born 1974), a former ski jumper and three time silver medallist at the 1992 Winter Olympics
- Hannes Aigner (born 1981), an Austrian former footballer who played over 400 games
- Michael Steinlechner (born 1987), an Austrian footballer who played 266 games
- Stephanie Brunner (born 1994), an World Cup alpine ski racer and team silver medallist at the 2018 Winter Olympics
- Franjo Ivanović (born 2003), a Croatian footballer

== International relations ==
=== Twin towns – sister cities ===
Schwaz is twinned with:

(France) Bourg-de-Péage; (Germany) Mindelheim; (Italy) Tramin; (Italy) Trento	(Italy) Verbania; (Romania) Satu Mare; (Spain) Sant Feliu de Guíxols; (United Kingdom) East Grinstead

== Gallery ==
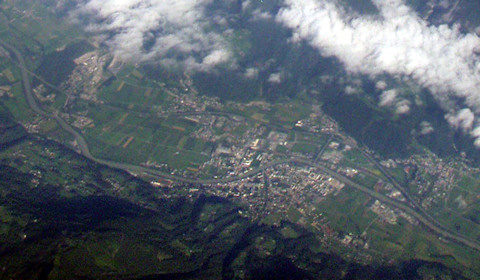
Aerial view

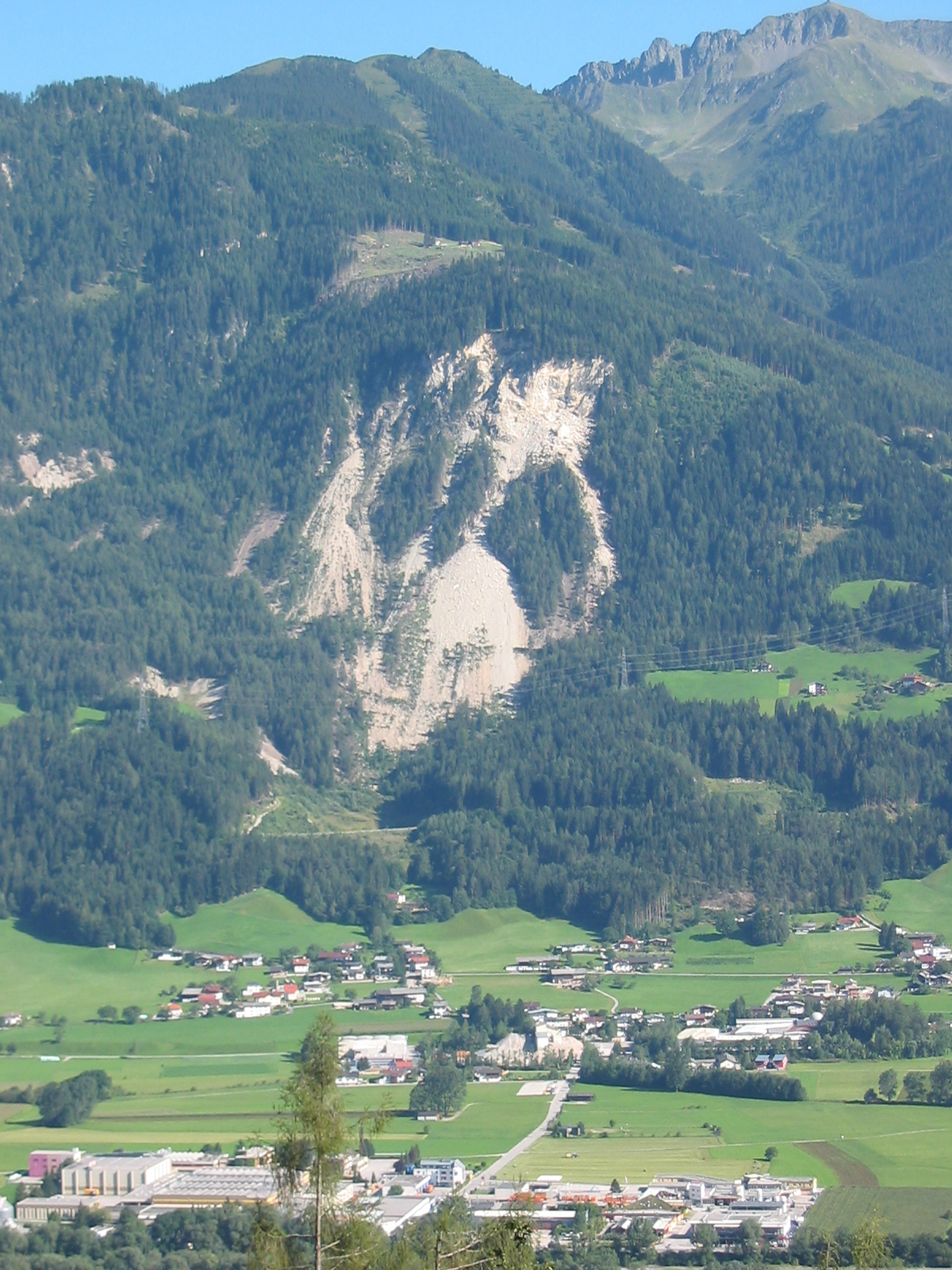
Eiblschrofen near Schwaz, seen from N.

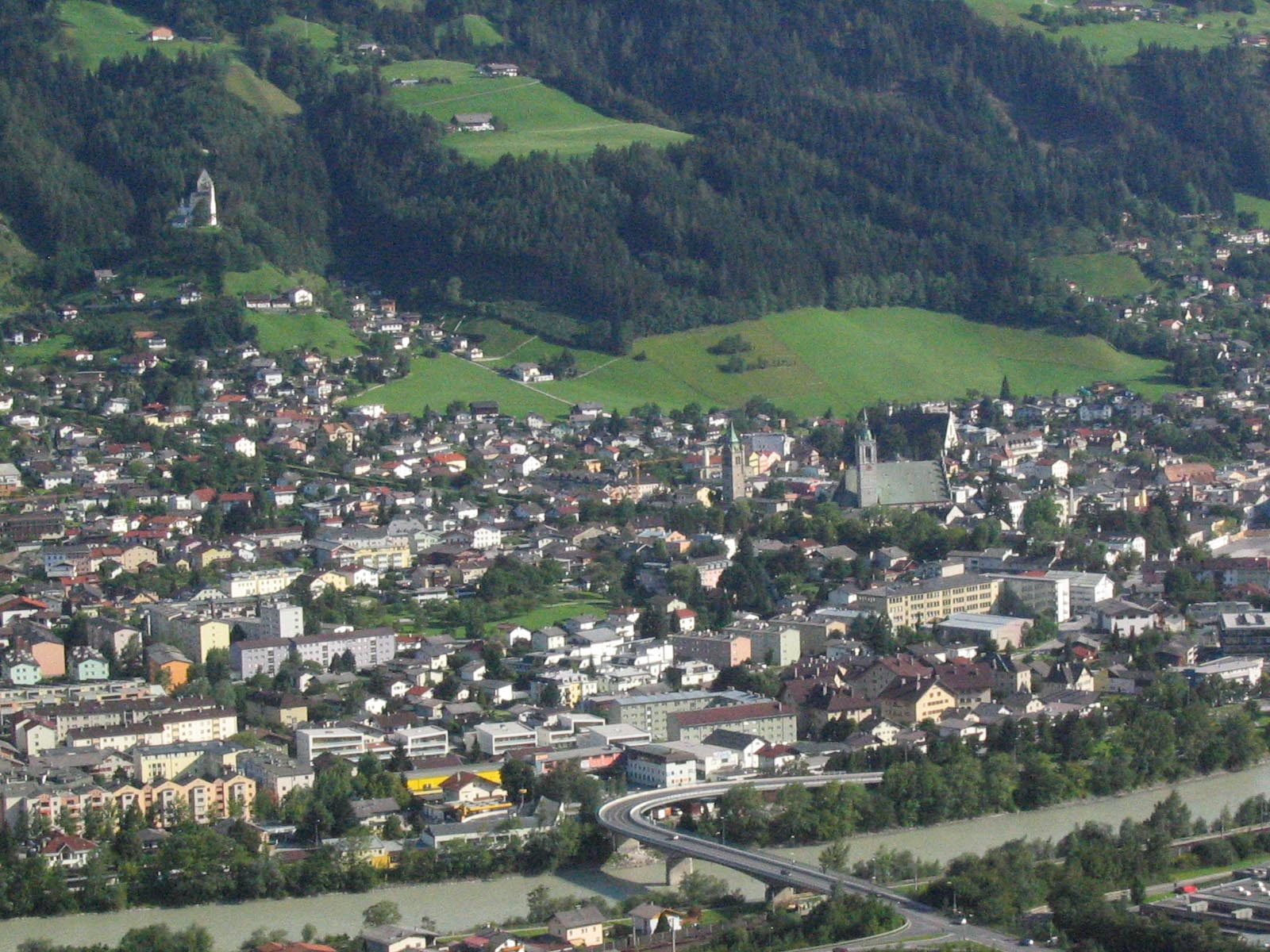
Schwaz seen from NE, closer

Schwaz, Parish Church, consecrated in 1502

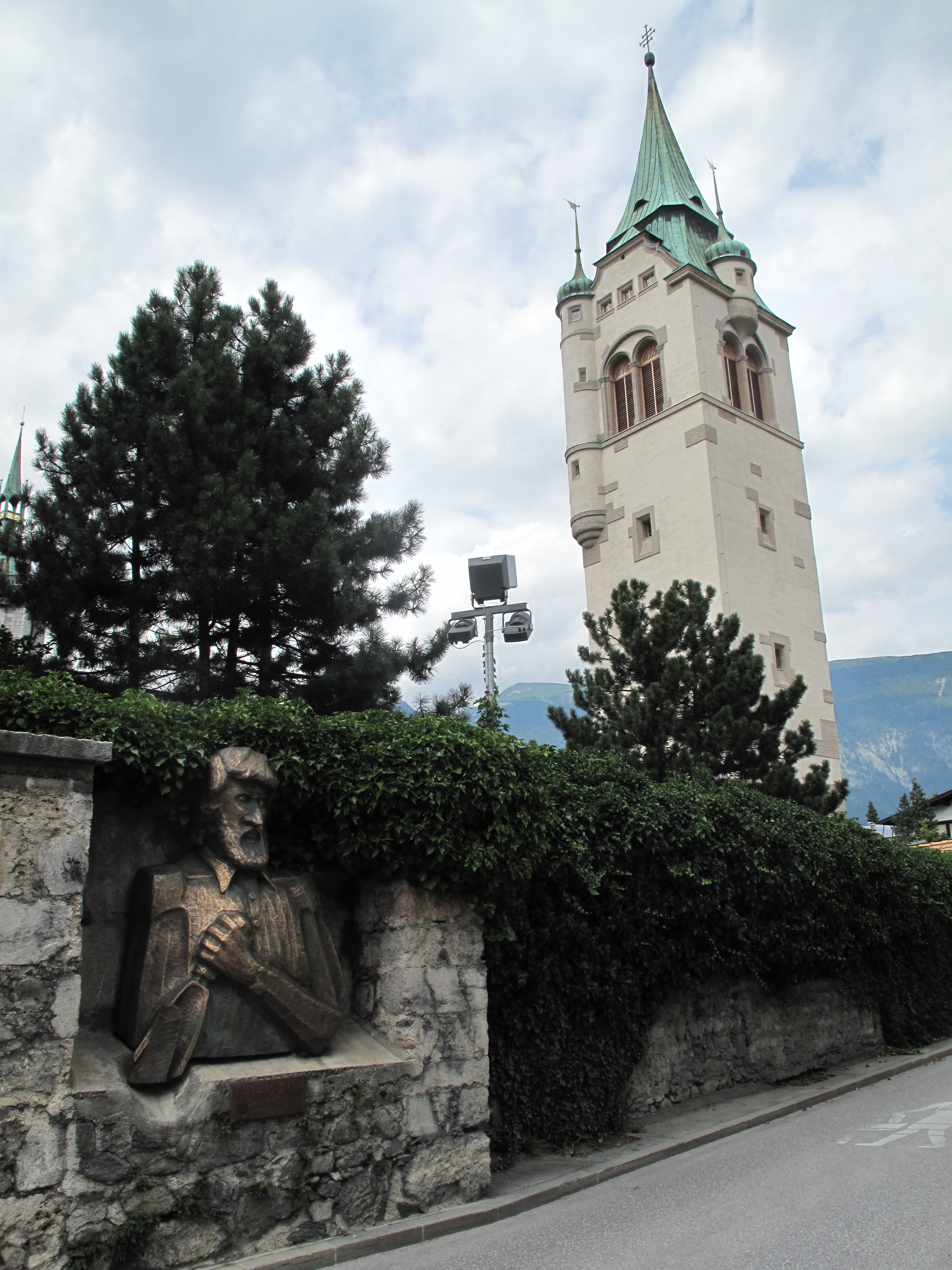
Tower (der Friedhofsturm) and bust from Ludwig Penz

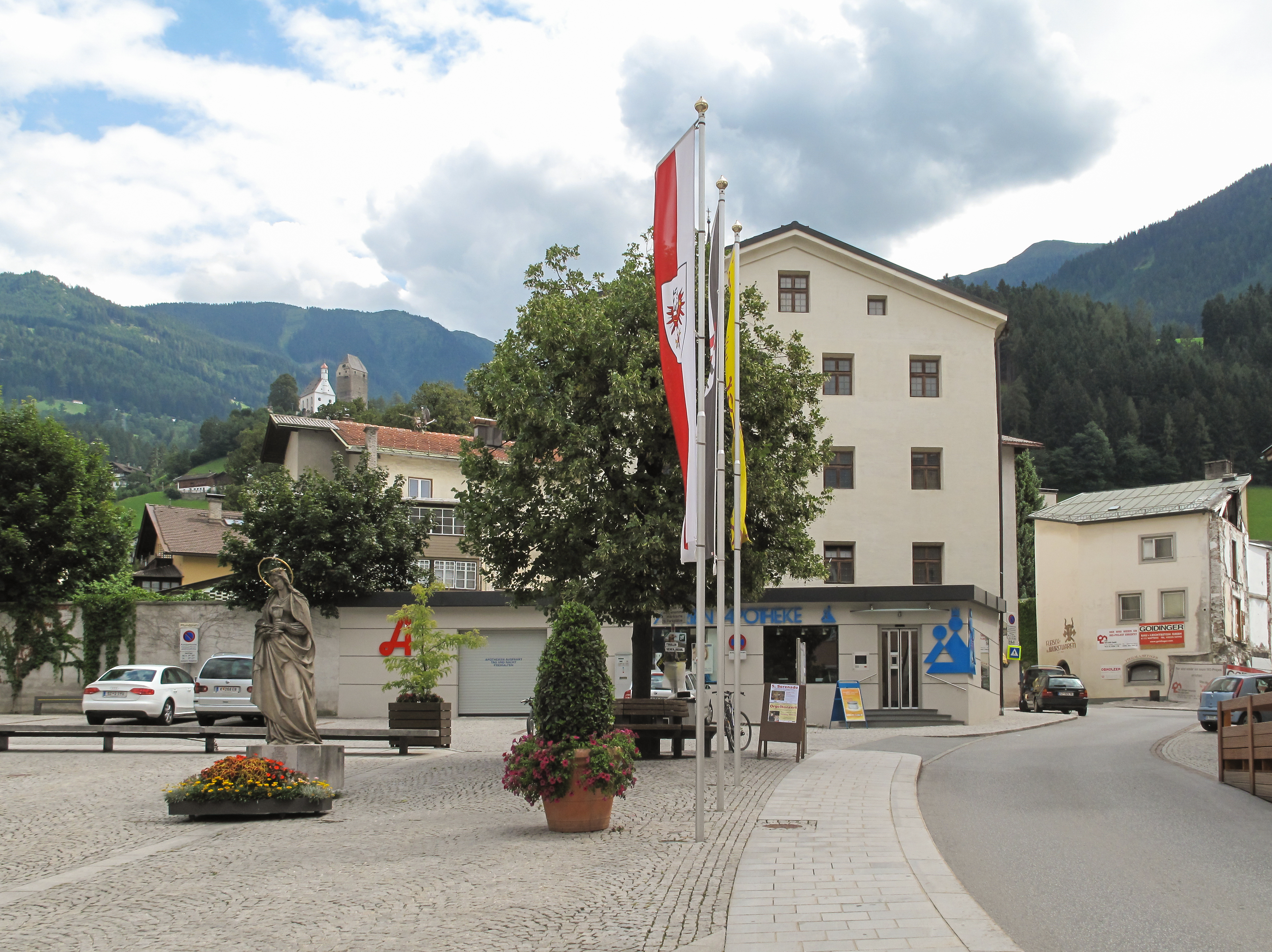
View to a street
