= 2016 World Singles Ninepin Bowling Classic Championships – Mixed tandem =

Mixed tandem at the 2016 World Singles Ninepin Bowling Classic Championships
- Location: Cluj-Napoca, Romania
- Dates: 22–23 May 2016
- Competitors: 64 from 16 nations

Medalists
gold medal	Luminita Viorica Dogaru; Nicolae Lupu	Romania
silver medal	Anita Sáfrány; László Karsai	Hungary
bronze medal	Lisa Vsetecka; Philipp Vsetecka	Austria
bronze medal	Simone Schneider; Fabian Seitz	Germany

The mixed tandem event at the 2016 World Singles Ninepin Bowling Classic Championships was held in Cluj-Napoca, Romania on 22–23 May 2016. The first round took place after ending of the sprint events. Rest part was played the next day.

The new world champions in mixed tandems became the Romanians Luminita Viorica Dogaru and Nicolae Lupu. The silver medals went to Hungarians Anita Sáfrány and László Karsai, while the bronzes were won by Austrians Lisa Vsetecka and Philipp Vsetecka, and Germans Simone Schneider and Fabian Seitz.

== Results ==
=== Starting places ===
The starting places have been allocated on the basis of each team's achievements during the previous championships.

	(Austria) AUT	(Bosnia and Herzegovina) BIH	(Croatia) CRO	(Czech Republic) CZE	(Denmark) DEN	(Estonia) EST	(France) FRA	(Germany) GER	(Hungary) HUN	(Italy) ITA	(Montenegro) MNE	(Poland) POL	(Romania) ROU	(Slovenia) SLO	(Serbia) SRB	(Slovakia) SVK	(Slovakia) SWE	Total
Number of seeds	3	2	3	2	1	1	1	1	3	1	1	1	2	3	3	3	1	32

=== Draw ===
The tandems were drawn into bouts with the reservation that pair from the same country can not play in the first round against each other.

Round of 32; 22 May
(Austria) Lisa Vsetecka (Austria) Philipp Vsetecka	1	13
(Czech Republic) Markéta Hofmanová (Czech Republic) Milan Svoboda	1	9
(Croatia) Klara Sedlar (Croatia) Mario Mušanić	2
(Serbia) Marija Kresović (Serbia) Miloš Simijonović	0
(Hungary) Petra Fegyveres (Hungary) Zsombor Zapletán	2
(Montenegro) Marija Hamm (Montenegro) Kristian Kis	0
(Croatia) Nataša Ravnić-Gašparini (Croatia) Nikola Muše	2
(Bosnia and Herzegovina) Dragana Lotina (Bosnia and Herzegovina) Darko Lotina	0
(Serbia) Zorica Barać (Serbia) Robert Ernješi	2
(Poland) Joanna Lajtke (Poland) Leszek Torka	0
(Hungary) Anita Sáfrány (Hungary) László Karsai	2
(Slovenia) Anja Ulaga (Slovenia) Primož Pintarič	0
(Bosnia and Herzegovina) Tatjana Dajić (Bosnia and Herzegovina) Marko Trklja	0
(Slovakia) Dagmar Kyselicová (Slovakia) Erik Kuna	2
(Slovenia) Nada Savić (Slovenia) Matej Lepej	1	10
(Romania) Daniela Lacatusu (Romania) Ion Cercel	1	16
(Sweden) Maria Jönnsson (Sweden) Frederik Nilsson	2
(Estonia) Marian Saar (Estonia) Kaido Kirs	0
(France) Aurélie Rémy (France) Gianni Della Martire	1	11
(Slovakia) Katarína Valigurová (Slovakia) Tomáš Pašiak	1	13
(Romania) Luminita Viorica Dogaru (Romania) Nicolae Lupu	2
(Denmark) Christina Soerensen (Denmark) Peter Wiinberg Soerensen	0
(Hungary) Edina Tímár (Hungary) Norbert Kiss	1	15
(Croatia) Marijana Liović (Croatia) Hrvoje Marinović	1	10
(Austria) Dominique Pumpler (Austria) Martin Rathmayer	1	15
(Slovenia) Irena Mejač (Slovenia) Uroš Stoklas	1	12
(Czech Republic) Nikola Tatoušková (Czech Republic) Jiří Vícha	2
(Slovakia) Dana Klubertová (Slovakia) Peter Nemček	0
(Italy) Marion Thaler (Italy) Florian Thaler	1	28
(Serbia) Jasmina Anđelković (Serbia) Uros Jaglicic	1	27
(Germany) Simone Schneider (Germany) Fabian Seitz	2
(Austria) Monika Nguyen (Austria) Sasa Igumanović	0

Round of 16; 23 May
(Austria) Lisa Vsetecka (Austria) Philipp Vsetecka	2
(Croatia) Klara Sedlar (Croatia) Mario Mušanić	0
(Hungary) Petra Fegyveres (Hungary) Zsombor Zapletán	1	16
(Croatia) Nataša Ravnić-Gašparini (Croatia) Nikola Muše	1	14
(Serbia) Zorica Barać (Serbia) Robert Ernješi	0
(Hungary) Anita Sáfrány (Hungary) László Karsai	2
(Slovakia) Dagmar Kyselicová (Slovakia) Erik Kuna	1	28
(Romania) Daniela Lacatusu (Romania) Ion Cercel	1	31
(Sweden) Maria Jönnsson (Sweden) Frederik Nilsson	0
(Slovakia) Katarína Valigurová (Slovakia) Tomáš Pašiak	2
(Romania) Luminita Viorica Dogaru (Romania) Nicolae Lupu	2
(Hungary) Edina Tímár (Hungary) Norbert Kiss	0
(Austria) Dominique Pumpler (Austria) Martin Rathmayer	1	11
(Czech Republic) Nikola Tatoušková (Czech Republic) Jiří Vícha	1	12
(Italy) Marion Thaler (Italy) Florian Thaler	0
(Germany) Simone Schneider (Germany) Fabian Seitz	2

Quarterfinals; 23 May
(Austria) Lisa Vsetecka (Austria) Philipp Vsetecka	2
(Hungary) Petra Fegyveres (Hungary) Zsombor Zapletán	0
(Hungary) Anita Sáfrány (Hungary) László Karsai	1	15
(Romania) Daniela Lacatusu (Romania) Ion Cercel	1	8
(Slovakia) Katarína Valigurová (Slovakia) Tomáš Pašiak	1	13
(Romania) Luminita Viorica Dogaru (Romania) Nicolae Lupu	1	16
(Czech Republic) Nikola Tatoušková (Czech Republic) Jiří Vícha	0
(Germany) Simone Schneider (Germany) Fabian Seitz	2

Semifinals; 23 May
(Austria) Lisa Vsetecka (Austria) Philipp Vsetecka	0
(Hungary) Anita Sáfrány (Hungary) László Karsai	2
(Romania) Luminita Viorica Dogaru (Romania) Nicolae Lupu	2
(Germany) Simone Schneider (Germany) Fabian Seitz	0

Final; 23 May
(Hungary) Anita Sáfrány (Hungary) László Karsai	1	5
(Romania) Luminita Viorica Dogaru (Romania) Nicolae Lupu	1	14
