= Vardi =

Vardi may refer to:

== People ==
- Arie Vardi (born 1937), Israeli classical pianist
- Emanuel Vardi (1915–2011), American violist and composer
- Moshe Vardi (born 1954), Israeli computer scientist
- Yair Vardi (1948–2025), Israeli dancer and choreographer
- Yossi Vardi (born 1942), Israeli tech entrepreneur

== Places ==
- Vardi, Estonia, village in Pärsti Parish, Viljandi County, Estonia.

== Arts Entertainment and Media ==
- Vardi (film), a 1989 Bollywood film

== See also ==
- Wardi (disambiguation)
