= Turva, Estonia =

Village in Estonia

Turva
- Village
- Location in Estonia
- Coordinates: 58°17′08″N 25°28′08″E
- Country: Estonia
- County: Viljandi County
- Municipality: Viljandi Parish

Population (2011 Census)
  - Total: 28

Turva is a village in Viljandi Parish, Viljandi County, Estonia. It is located about 12 km (7 mi) southwest of the town of Viljandi, on the right bank of the Kõpu River. It was a part of Pärsti Parish until 2013.

As of the 2011 census, the settlement's population was 28.

Turva village is the location of Peetri (Piitre) Manor. The Art Nouveau main building was built by Friedrich von Sivers, the owner of Heimtali Manor, in 1910–1912, according to the plans of architect Otto Wildau.
