= Viiratsi =

Borough in Estonia

- Small borough
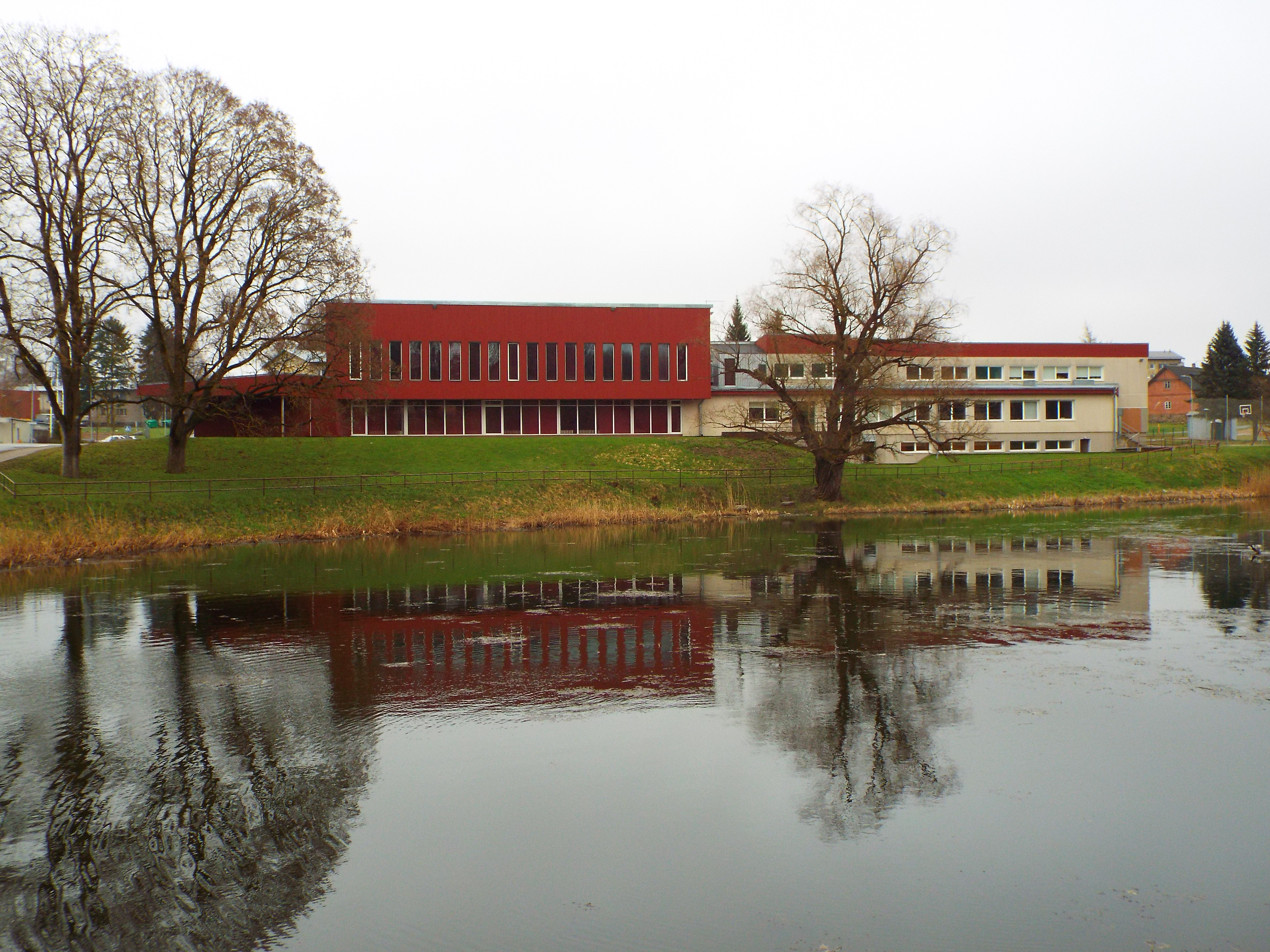
- Viiratsi elementary school

- Location in Estonia
- Coordinates: 58°21′32″N 25°38′23″E
- Country: Estonia
- County: Viljandi County
- Municipality: Viljandi Parish

Population (2011 Census)
  - Total: 1,332

Viiratsi (before 1920: Wieratz) is a small borough (Estonian: alevik) in Viljandi Parish, Viljandi County, Estonia. As of the 2011 census, the settlement's population was 1,332.

The Commander-in-chief of the Estonian Army Johan Laidoner (1884–1953) was born in Raja farmstead near Viiratsi, site now located in nearby Vardja village.
