= Helene Taar =

Estonian journalist and academic (1880-1972)

Helene Taar-Segalla
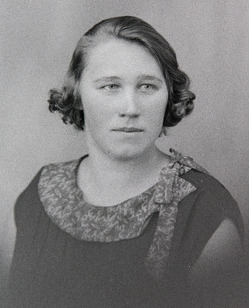
- Helene Taar as photographed by Jaan Riet in Viljandi in 1929.
- Born: Helene Elise Taar; June 3, 1880; Vana-Võidu, Viljandimaa, Russian Empire
- Died: 2 February 1972 (aged 91); Trento, Italy
- Resting place: Cimitero monumentale di Trento
- Education: University of Bern
- Occupations: Journalist, academic
- Spouse: Silvio Segalla (m. 1911)

Helene Taar-Segalla (born 3 June 1880 – 2 February 1972) was an Estonian journalist and academic, who was one of the first Estonian women to hold a doctoral degree.

== Biography ==
=== Early life ===
Helene Elise Taar was born on 3 June 1880 in Vana-Võidu, Viljandimaa. She received her primary education at home through a private governess. She pursued further academic studies at a German private girls' school located in Viljandi.

=== Career ===
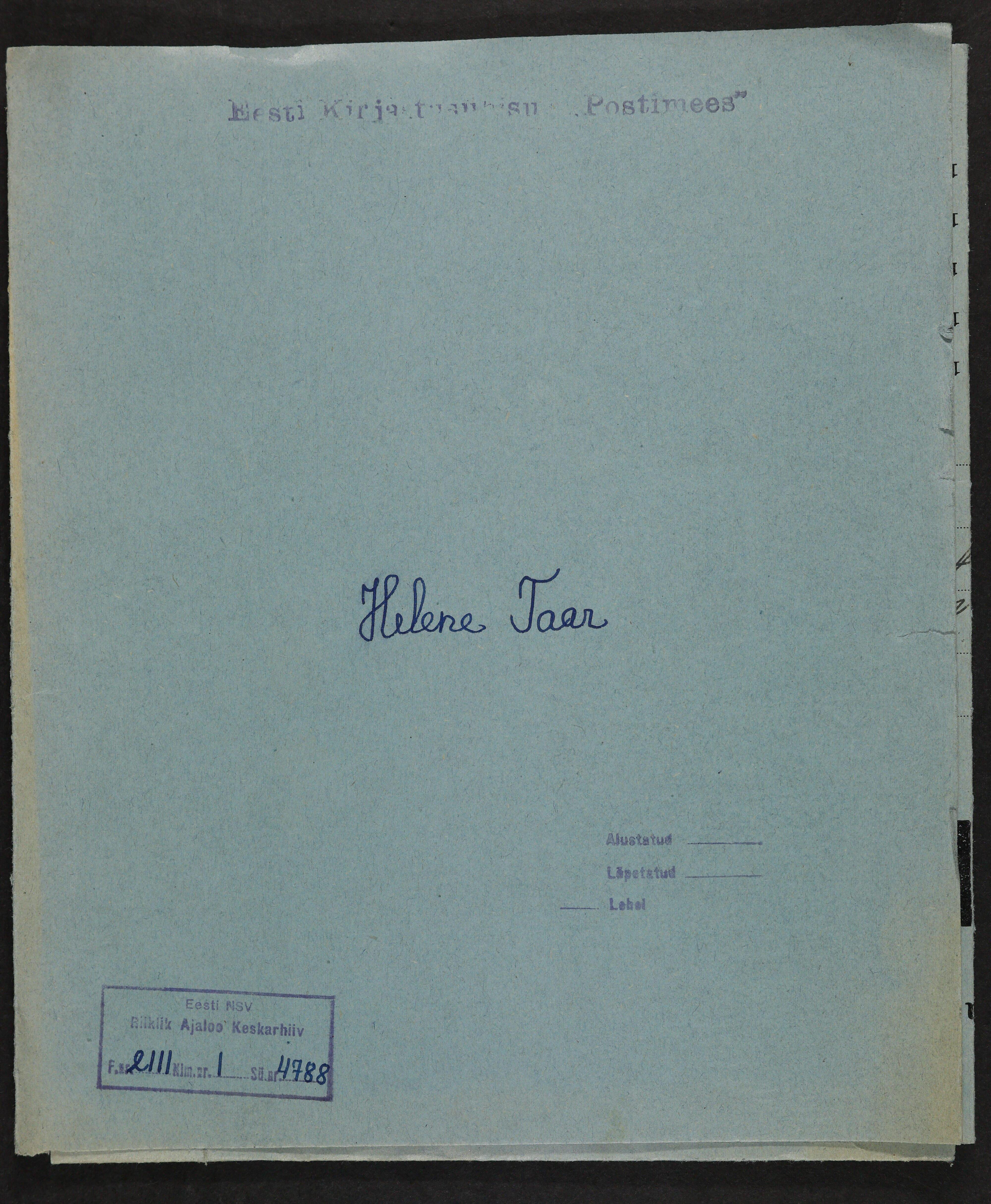
An unpublished manuscript for an article Taar submitted to the newspaper Postimees in 1910.

During the winter semester of 1904/1905, Taar enrolled at the Faculty of Philosophy at the University of Bern in Switzerland. She completed her doctoral examination on 9 November 1909, earning a doctoral degree. Her scholarly thesis focused on economic and educational history, was titled Die beiden Schlözer, and was printed formally in 1912.

Throughout her university tenure, Taar authored travelogues, cultural essays, and literary reports for Estonian news publications. She was among the first women from the territory of modern Estonia to successfully defend a doctoral thesis at a foreign university.

=== Personal life ===
In 1911, Taar married Professor Silvio Segalla in Berlin. After her marriage, she worked professionally under the name Helene Taar-Segalla.
