= Leppoja Nature Reserve =

Protected area in Estonia

- Location within Estonia
- Location: Estonia
- Coordinates: 58°23′N 25°20′E
- Area: 378 ha (930 acres)
- Established: 2005

Leppoja Nature Reserve is a nature reserve which is located in Viljandi County, Estonia.

The area of the nature reserve is 378 ha.

The protected area was founded in 2005 to protect valuable habitat types and threatened species in Tohvri village (former Pärsti Parish).
