= Võistre =

Village in Estonia

- Village
- Location in Estonia
- Coordinates: 58°26′21″N 25°35′37″E
- Country: Estonia
- County: Viljandi County
- Municipality: Viljandi Parish

Population (01.01.2010)
  - Total: 83

Võistre is a village in Viljandi Parish, Viljandi County, Estonia. It has a population of 83 (as of 1 January 2010). It was a part of Saarepeedi Parish until 2013.
