= Parika, Estonia =

Village in Estonia

- Village
- Location within Estonia
- Coordinates: 58.495°N 25.835°E
- Country: Estonia
- County: Viljandi County
- Parish: Viljandi Parish
- Time zone: UTC+2 (EET)
  - Summer (DST): UTC+3 (EEST)

Parika is a village in Viljandi Parish, Viljandi County in Estonia.
