= Vanamõisa, Viljandi County =

Village in Estonia

Vanamõisa
- Village
- Location in Estonia
- Coordinates: 58°26′48″N 25°28′57″E
- Country: Estonia
- County: Viljandi County
- Municipality: Viljandi Parish

Population (04.01.2010)
  - Total: 54

Vanamõisa is a village in Viljandi Parish, Viljandi County, Estonia. It has a population of 54 (as of 4 January 2010). It was a part of Pärsti Parish until 2013.

== See also ==
- Battle of St. Matthew's Day (1217)
