= Välgita =

Village in Estonia

- Village
- Location in Estonia
- Coordinates: 58°28′20″N 25°38′50″E
- Country: Estonia
- County: Viljandi County
- Municipality: Viljandi Parish

Population (01.01.2010)
  - Total: 116

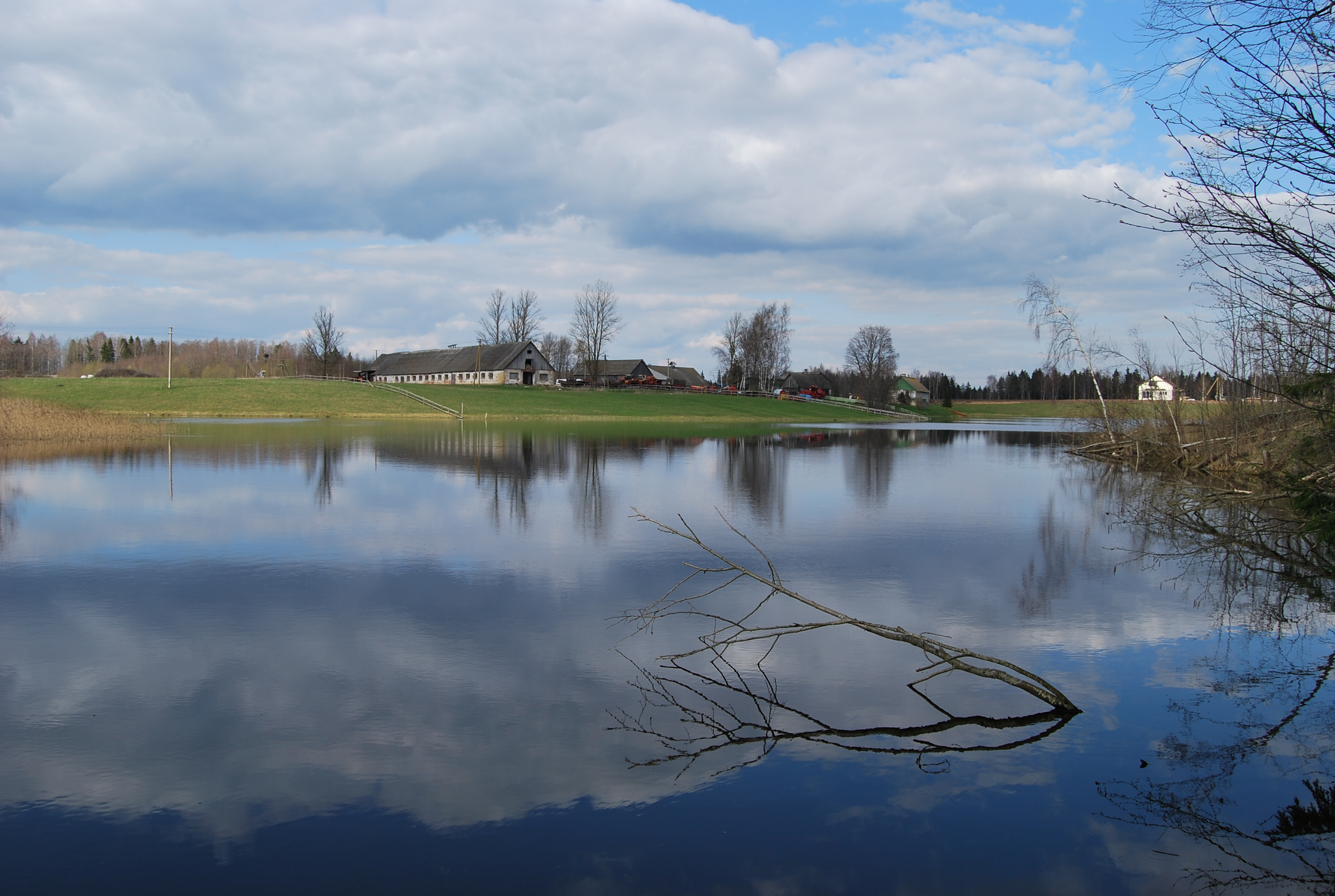
Lake Muraka, Viljandi district

Välgita is a village in Viljandi Parish, Viljandi County, Estonia. It has a population of 116 (as of 1 January 2010). It was a part of Saarepeedi Parish until 2013.

Välgita is the location of OÜ Valge VN, producer of solid timber products.
