= Wardi =

Wardi may refer to:

- Wardi, Iran - village in Tehran Province, Iran
- Alaa Wardi - Saudi singer and musician
- Ibn al-Wardi - Medieval Arab historian and poet (died 1349), or Arab geographer of the same name (died 1457)
- Mohamed Saïd El Wardi - Moroccan athlete
- Mohammed Wardi - Nubian Sudanese singer and songwriter
- Burmese short-tailed shrew - Blarinella wardi

== See also ==
- Vardi (disambiguation)
