= Peetrimõisa, Viljandi County =

Village in Estonia

Peetrimõisa
- Village
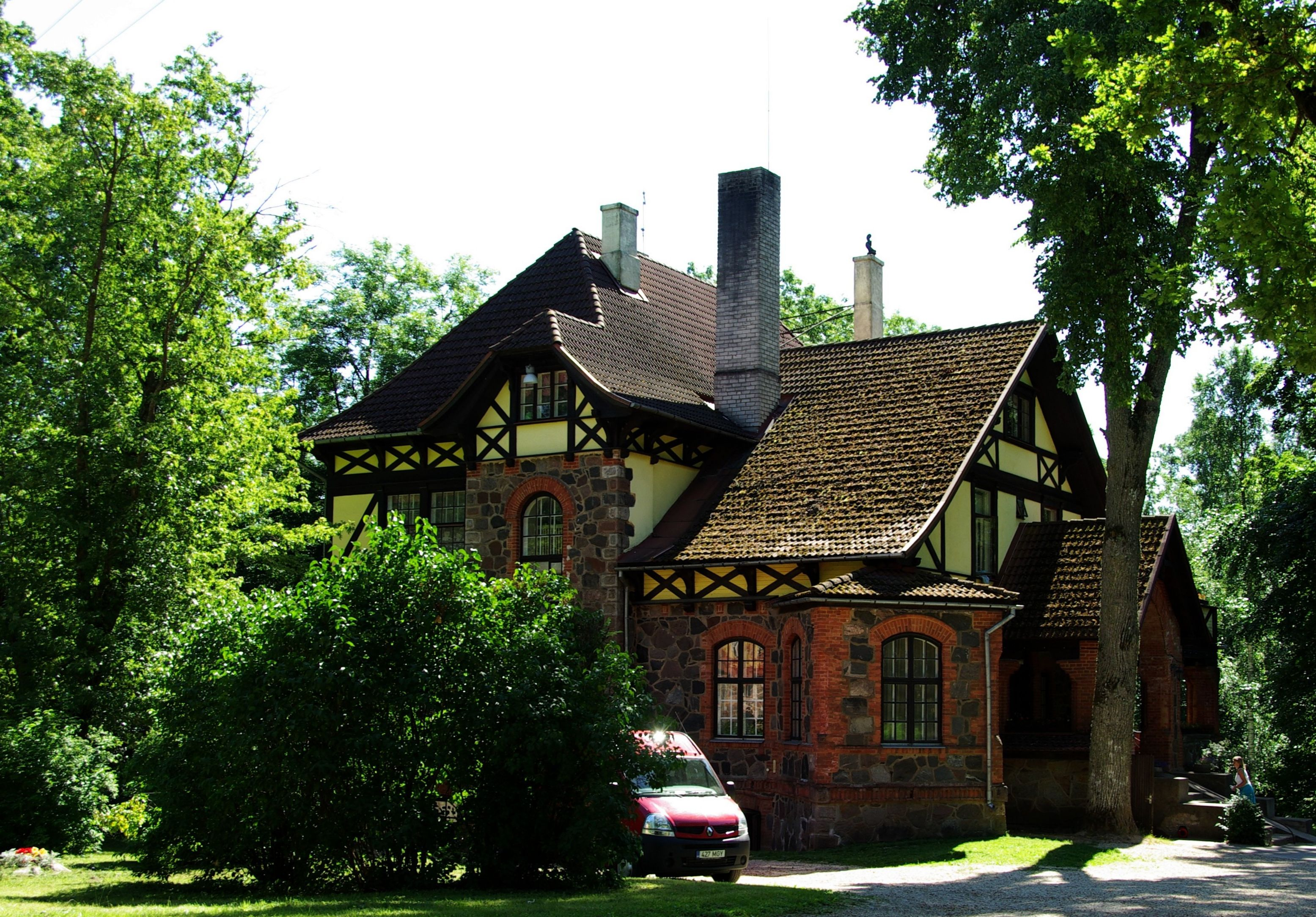
- Väikemõisa manor in Peetrimõisa

- Location in Estonia
- Coordinates: 58°22′52″N 25°37′22″E
- Country: Estonia
- County: Viljandi County
- Municipality: Viljandi Parish

Population (1 January 2010)
  - Total: 199

Peetrimõisa is a village in Viljandi Parish, Viljandi County, Estonia. It had a population of 199 as of 1 January 2010. It was a part of Saarepeedi Parish until 2013.
