= Kingu, Estonia =

Village in Estonia

Kingu
- Village
- Location in Estonia
- Coordinates: 58°21′59″N 25°24′33″E
- Country: Estonia
- County: Viljandi County
- Municipality: Viljandi Parish

Population (04.01.2010)
  - Total: 20

Kingu is a village in Viljandi Parish, Viljandi County, Estonia. It has a population of 20 (as of 4 January 2010). It was a part of Pärsti Parish until 2013.
