= Ramsi =

Borough in Estonia

- Small borough
- Location in Estonia
- Coordinates: 58°18′25″N 25°32′23″E
- Country: Estonia
- County: Viljandi County
- Municipality: Viljandi Parish

Population (2011)
  - Total: 633

Ramsi is a small borough (Estonian: alevik) in Viljandi Parish, Viljandi County, Estonia. As of the 2011 census, the settlement's population was 633. It was a part of Pärsti Parish until 2013.
