= Kiisa, Viljandi County =

Village in Estonia

Kiisa
- Village
- Location in Estonia
- Coordinates: 58°18′50″N 25°27′34″E
- Country: Estonia
- County: Viljandi County
- Municipality: Viljandi Parish

Population (04.01.2010)
  - Total: 47

Kiisa is a village in Viljandi Parish, Viljandi County, Estonia. It has a population of 47 (as of 4 January 2010). It was a part of Pärsti Parish until 2013.

Poet, politician and doctor Johannes Vares (1890–1946) was born in Kiisa.
