= Päri, Viljandi County =

Village in Estonia

Päri
- Village
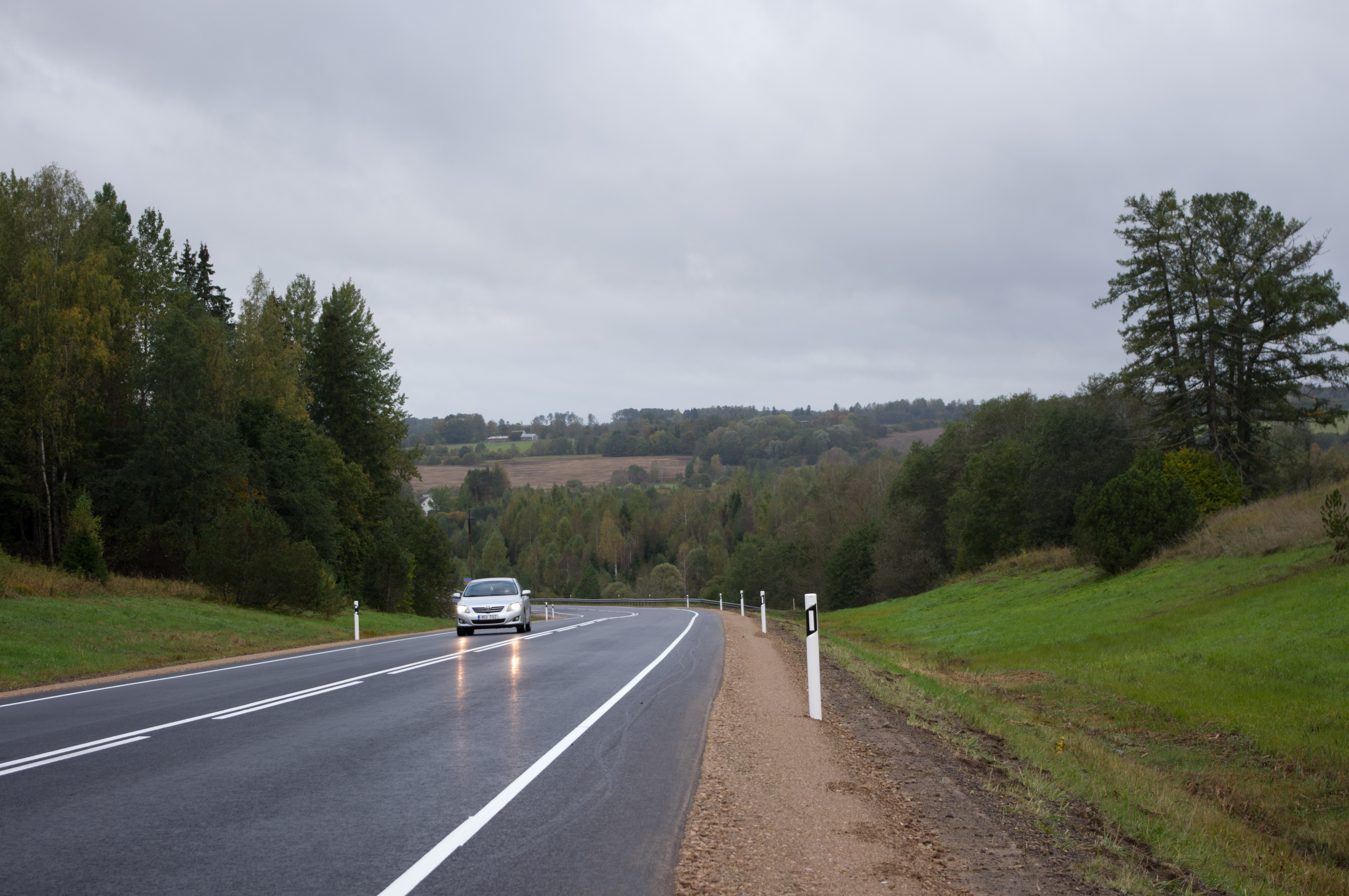

- Location in Estonia
- Coordinates: 58°20′21″N 25°29′59″E
- Country: Estonia
- County: Viljandi County
- Municipality: Viljandi Parish

Population (04.01.2010)
  - Total: 496

Päri is a village in Viljandi Parish, Viljandi County, Estonia. It has a population of 496 (as of 4 January 2010). It was a part of Pärsti Parish until 2013.

Viljandi Airfield (ICAO: EEVI) is located in Päri.
