= Raudna =

Village in Estonia

- Village
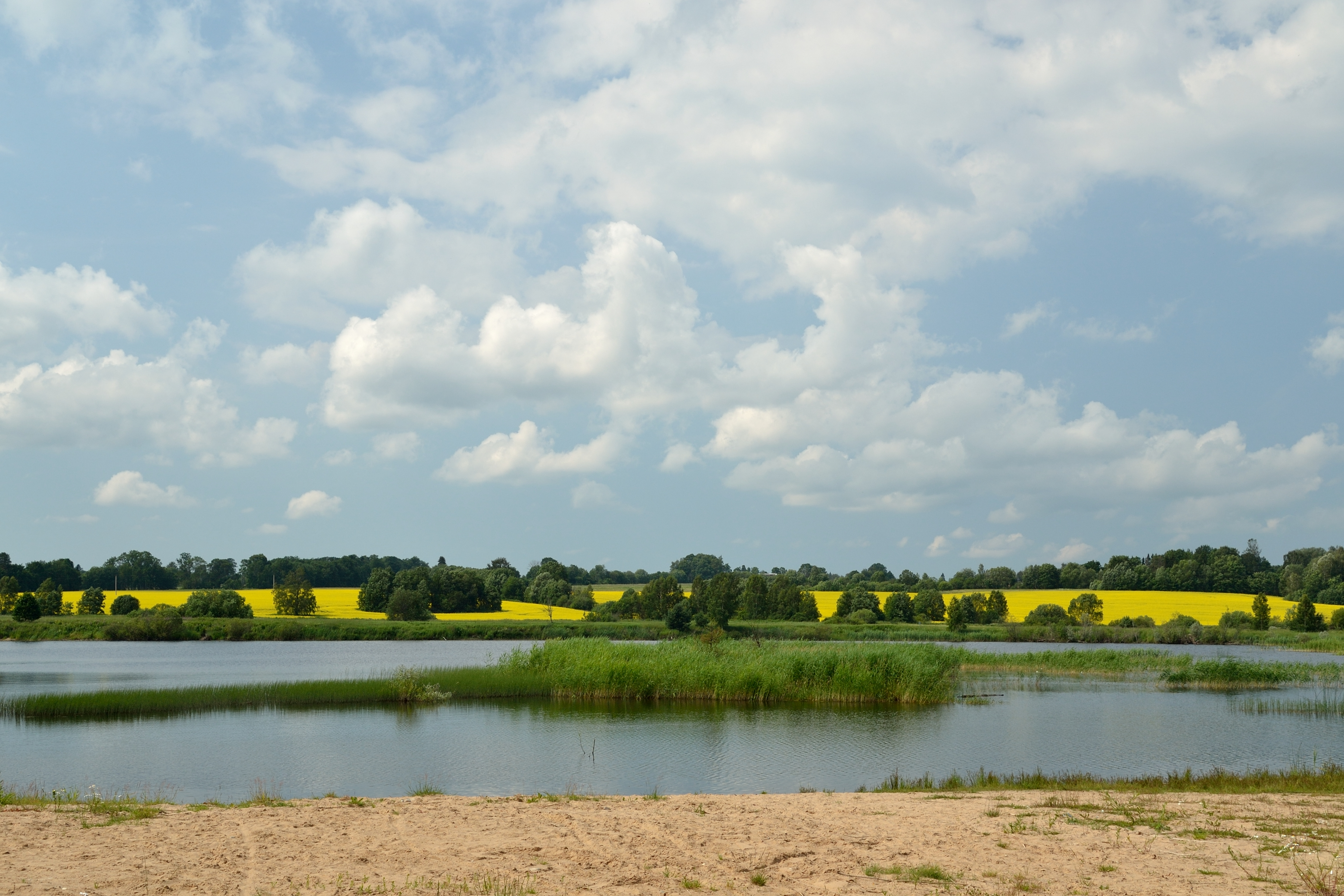
- Raudna artificial lake

- Location in Estonia
- Coordinates: 58°20′36″N 25°28′27″E
- Country: Estonia
- County: Viljandi County
- Municipality: Viljandi Parish

Population (04.01.2010)
  - Total: 25

Raudna is a village in Viljandi Parish, Viljandi County, Estonia. It has a population of 25 (as of 4 January 2010). It was a part of Pärsti Parish until 2013.
