= Viljandi Parish =

Municipality of Estonia

Coordinates: 58.2667°N 25.6167°E

Viljandi Parish Viljandi vald
- Municipality of Estonia
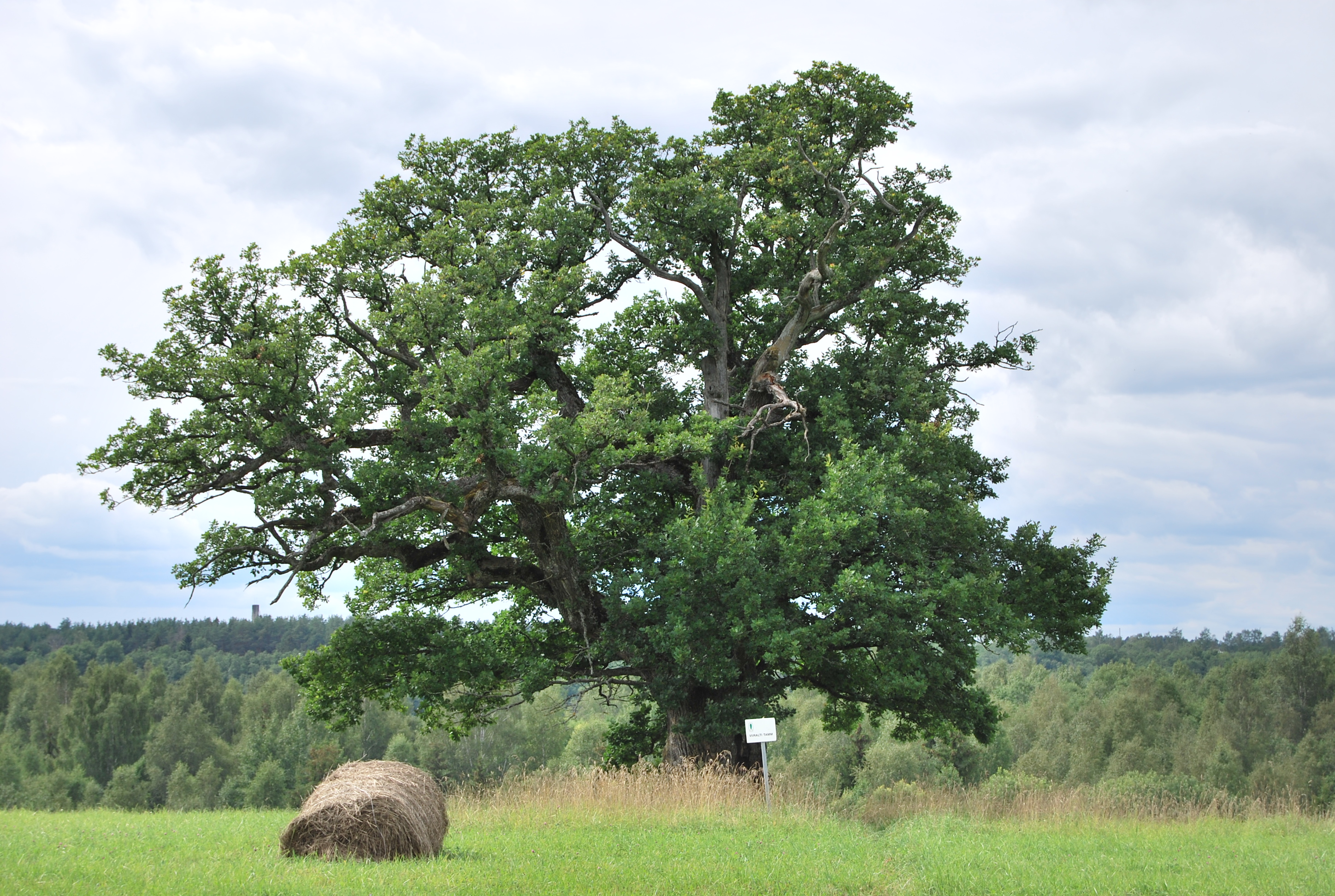

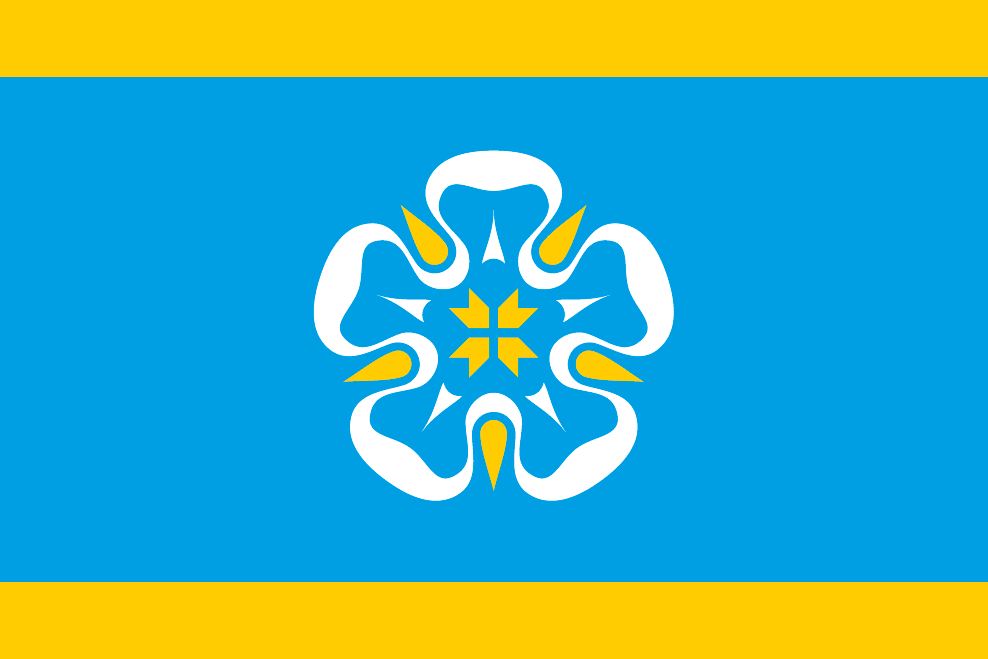
- Flag Coat of arms

- Viljandi Parish within Viljandi County
- Country: Estonia
- County: Viljandi County
- Administrative centre: Viljandi

Government
  - Mayor: Alar Karu (IRL)

Area
  - Total: 651 km^{2} (251 sq mi)

Population (2019)
  - Total: 13,569
  - Density: 20.8/km^{2} (54.0/sq mi)
- ISO 3166 code: EE-899
- Website: www.viljandivald.ee

Viljandi Parish (Estonian: Viljandi vald) is a rural municipality of Viljandi County, Estonia. It is located around the town of Viljandi, but does not include it.

Viljandi Parish was established by merging four municipalities: Paistu, Pärsti, Saarepeedi and Viiratsi parishes. This took place after the municipal elections held on 20 October 2013.

Between 1939 and 1950, Viljandi Parish existed with different borders.

== Populated places ==
Viljandi Parish has four small boroughs (alevik): Kolga-Jaani, Mustla, Ramsi and Viiratsi and approximately 126 villages, including:

- Aidu
- Aindu
- Alustre
- Ämmuste
- Anikatsi
- Auksi
- Eesnurga
- Heimtali
- Hendrikumõisa
- Holstre
- Intsu
- Jakobimõisa
- Jämejala
- Järtsaare
- Järveküla
- Jõeküla
- Kaavere
- Kalbuse
- Kannuküla
- Kärstna
- Karula
- Kassi
- Kibeküla
- Kiini
- Kiisa
- Kingu
- Kivilõppe
- Koidu
- Kokaviidika
- Kookla
- Kuressaare
- Kuudeküla
- Laanekuru
- Lalsi
- Lätkalu
- Leemeti
- Leie
- Loime
- Lolu
- Loodi
- Luiga
- Mäeltküla
- Mähma
- Maltsa
- Marjamäe
- Marna
- Matapera
- Meleski
- Metsla
- Mõnnaste
- Moori
- Muksi
- Mustapali
- Mustivere
- Odiste
- Oiu
- Oorgu
- Otiküla
- Pahuvere
- Paistu
- Päri
- Parika
- Pärsti
- Peetrimõisa
- Pikru
- Pinska
- Pirmastu
- Põrga
- Porsa
- Puiatu
- Pulleritsu
- Raassilla
- Raudna
- Rebase
- Rebaste
- Ridaküla
- Rihkama
- Riuma
- Roosilla
- Ruudiküla
- Saareküla
- Saarepeedi
- Savikoti
- Sinialliku
- Soe
- Sooviku
- Suislepa
- Sultsi
- Surva
- Taari
- Tagamõisa
- Taganurga
- Tänassilma
- Tarvastu
- Tinnikuru
- Tobraselja
- Tohvri
- Tömbi
- Tõnissaare
- Tõrreküla
- Turva
- Tusti
- Tõnuküla
- Ülensi
- Unametsa
- Uusna
- Väike-Kõpu
- Välgita
- Valma
- Väluste
- Vanamõisa
- Vanausse
- Vana-Võidu
- Vanavälja
- Vardi
- Vardja
- Vasara
- Veisjärve
- Verilaske
- Viisuküla Vilimeeste
- Villa
- Vissuvere
- Võistre
- Vooru

== Religion ==
The residents of the municipality are predominantly unaffiliated in terms of religion. The largest group of people who define themselves as religious are Lutherans, followed by Orthodox Christians. There are also other religious communities in the parish.

== Gallery ==
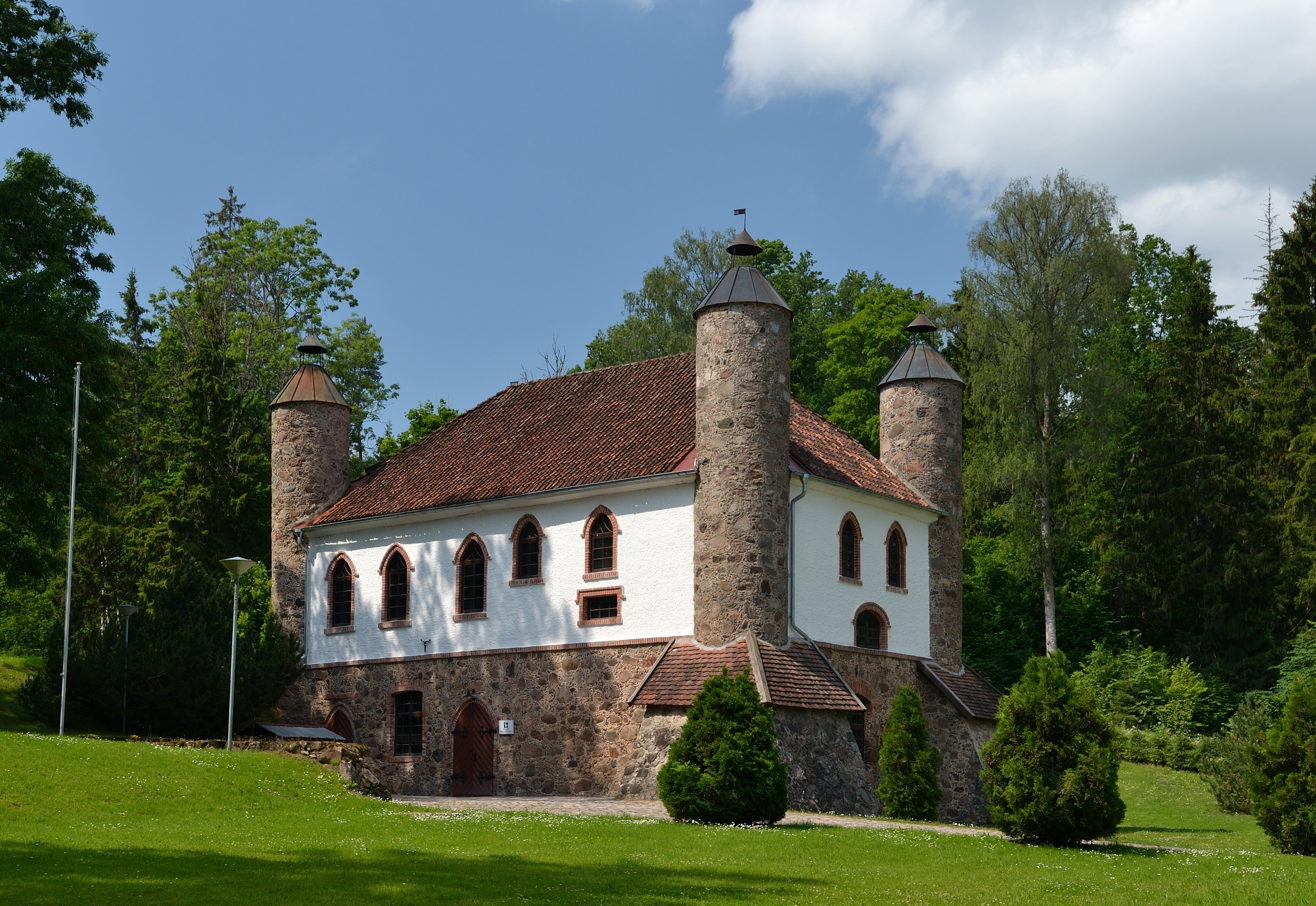
Heimtali Manor's distillery kitchen

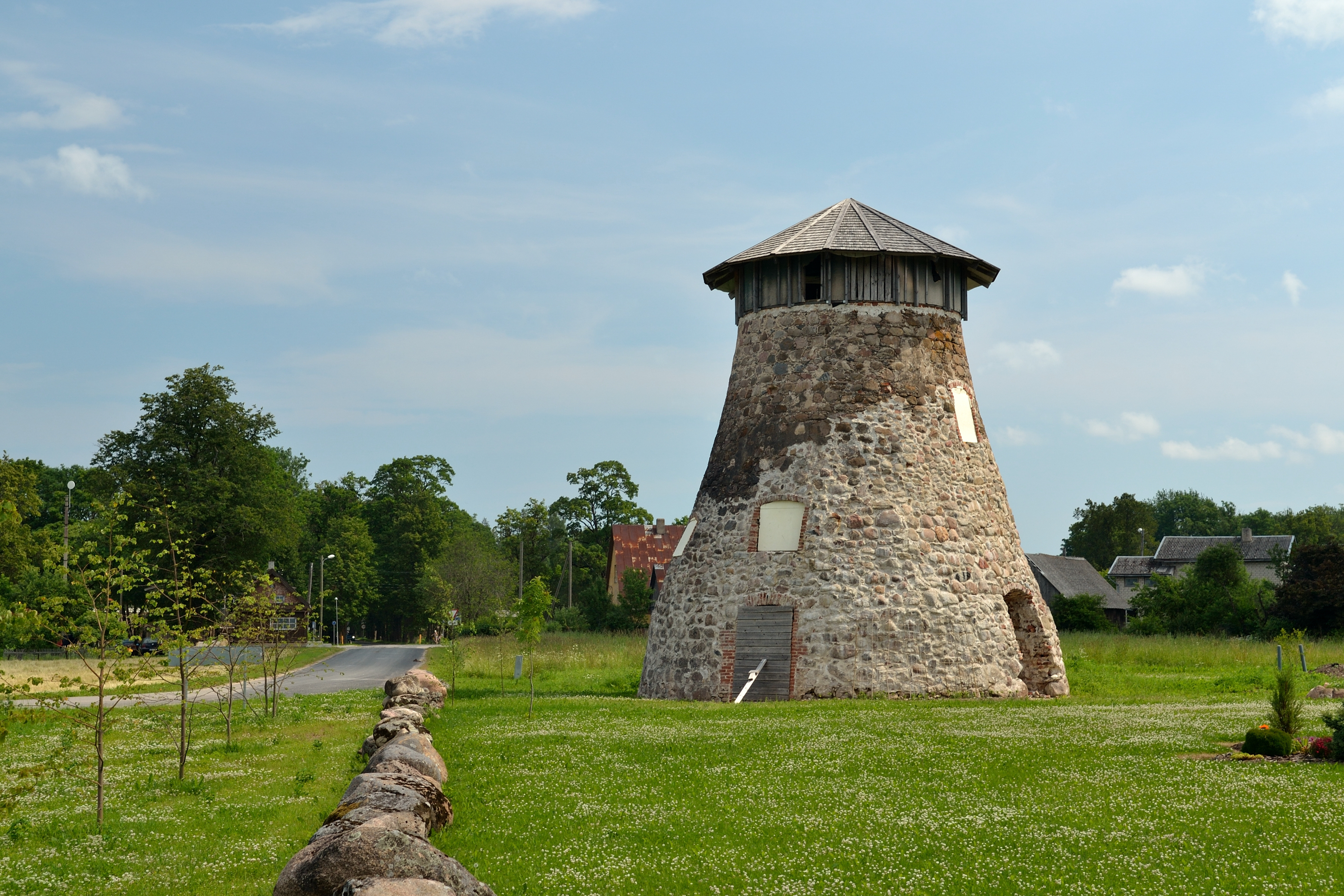
Heimtali Manor's windmill

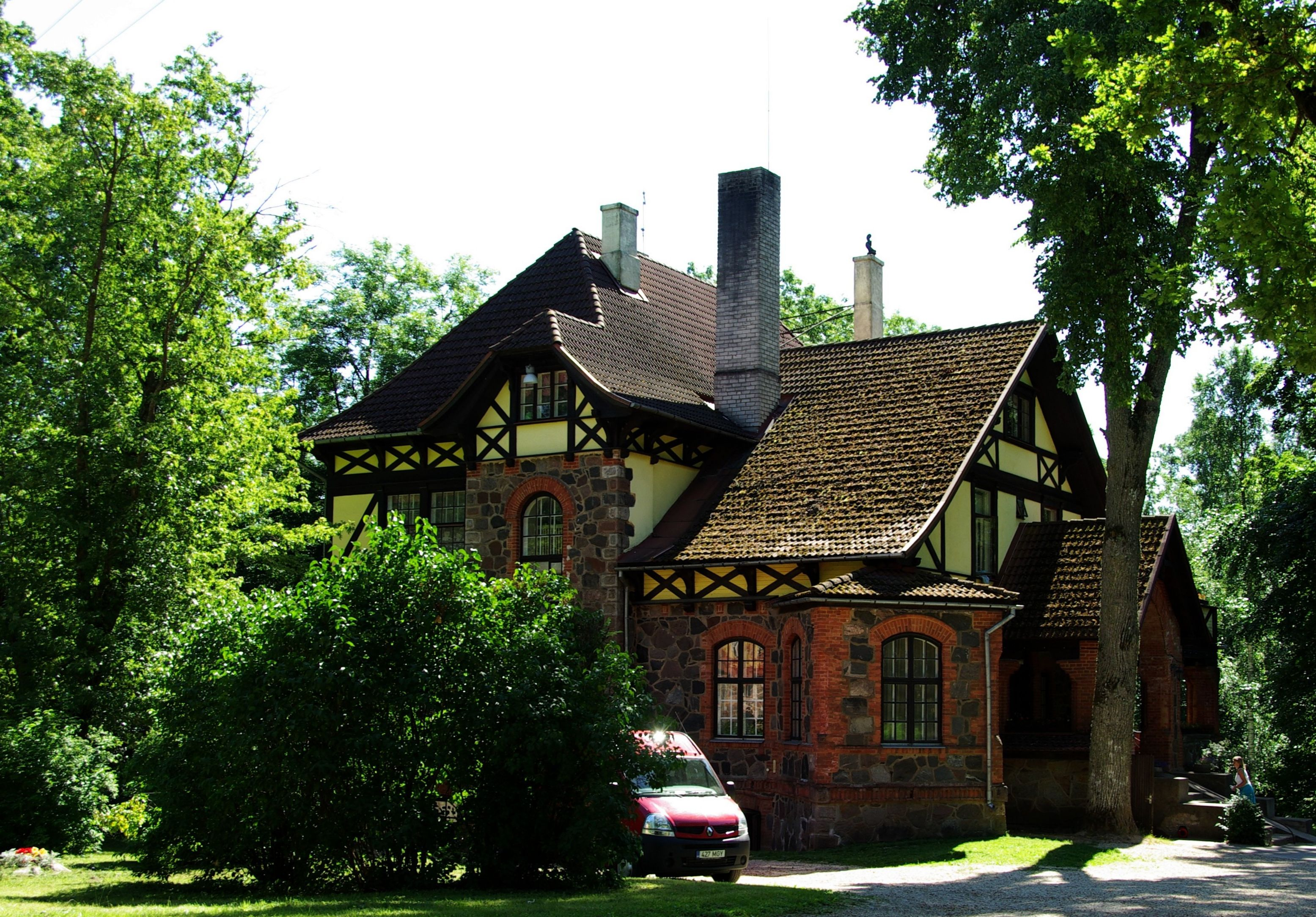
Väikemõisa Manor in Peetrimõisa

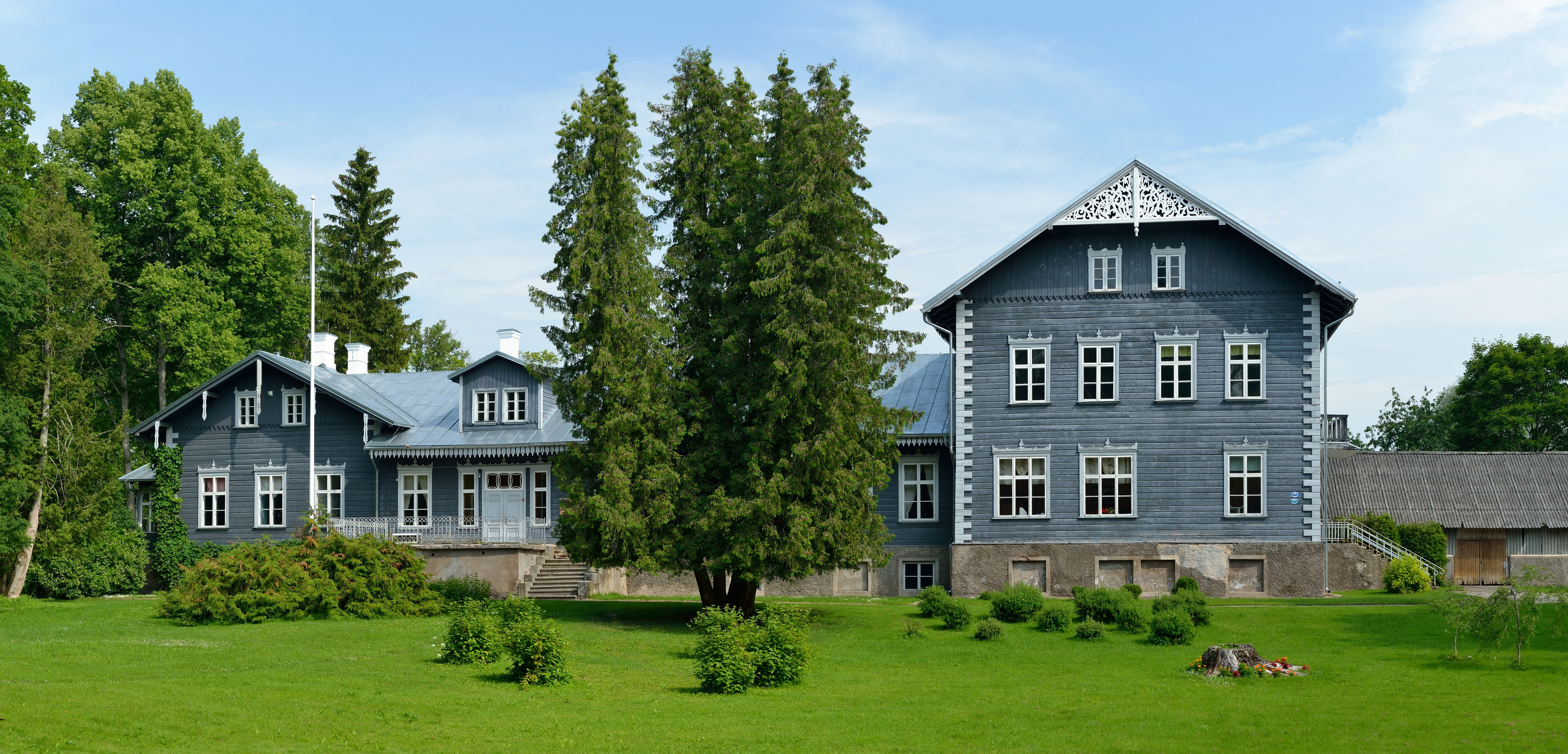
Main building, Pärsti Manor

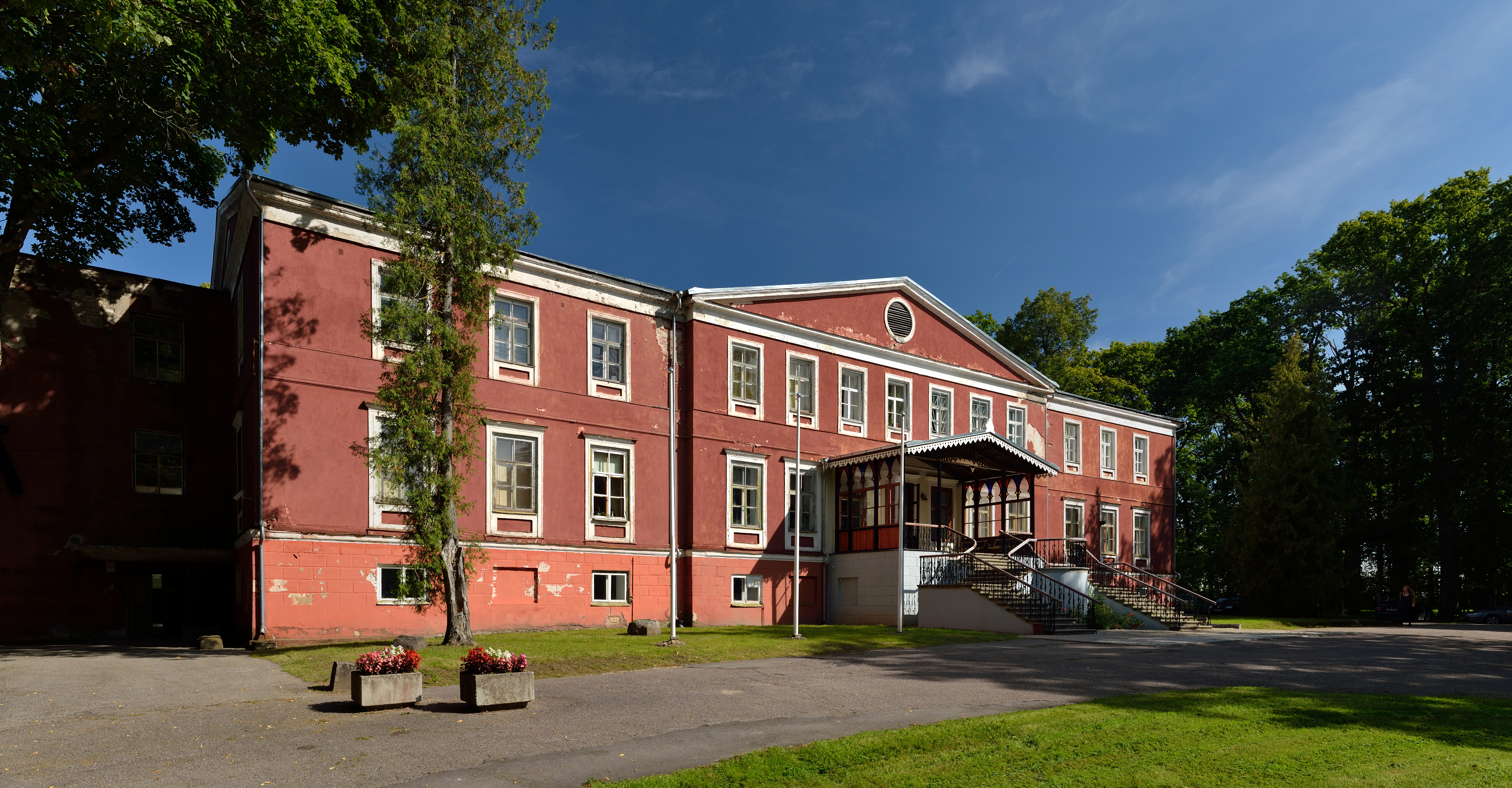
Main building of Vana-Võidu Manor, now Viljandi Joint Vocational Secondary School

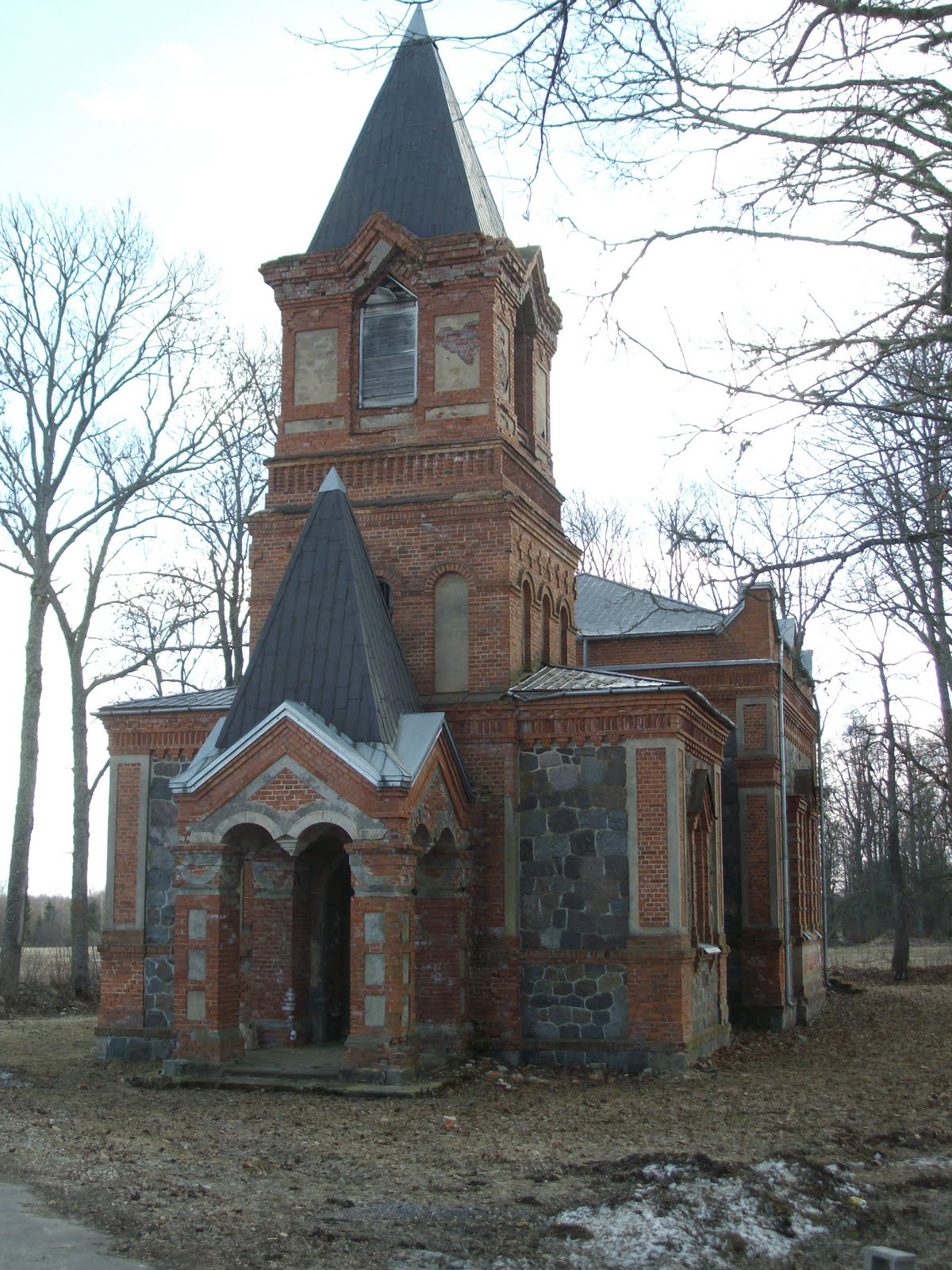
Tänassilma Orthodox church

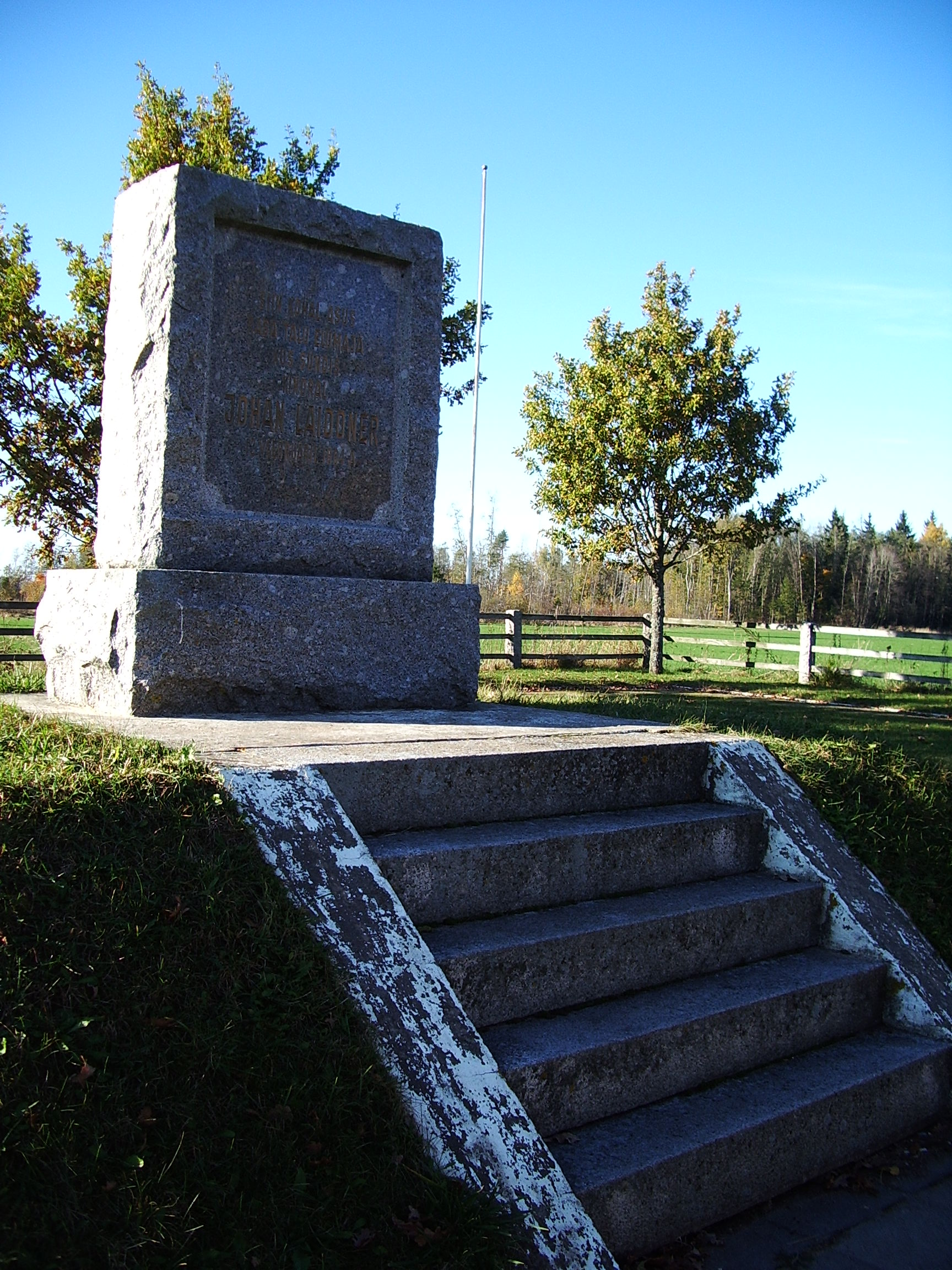
Memorial at military commander Johan Laidoner's birthplace in Vardja

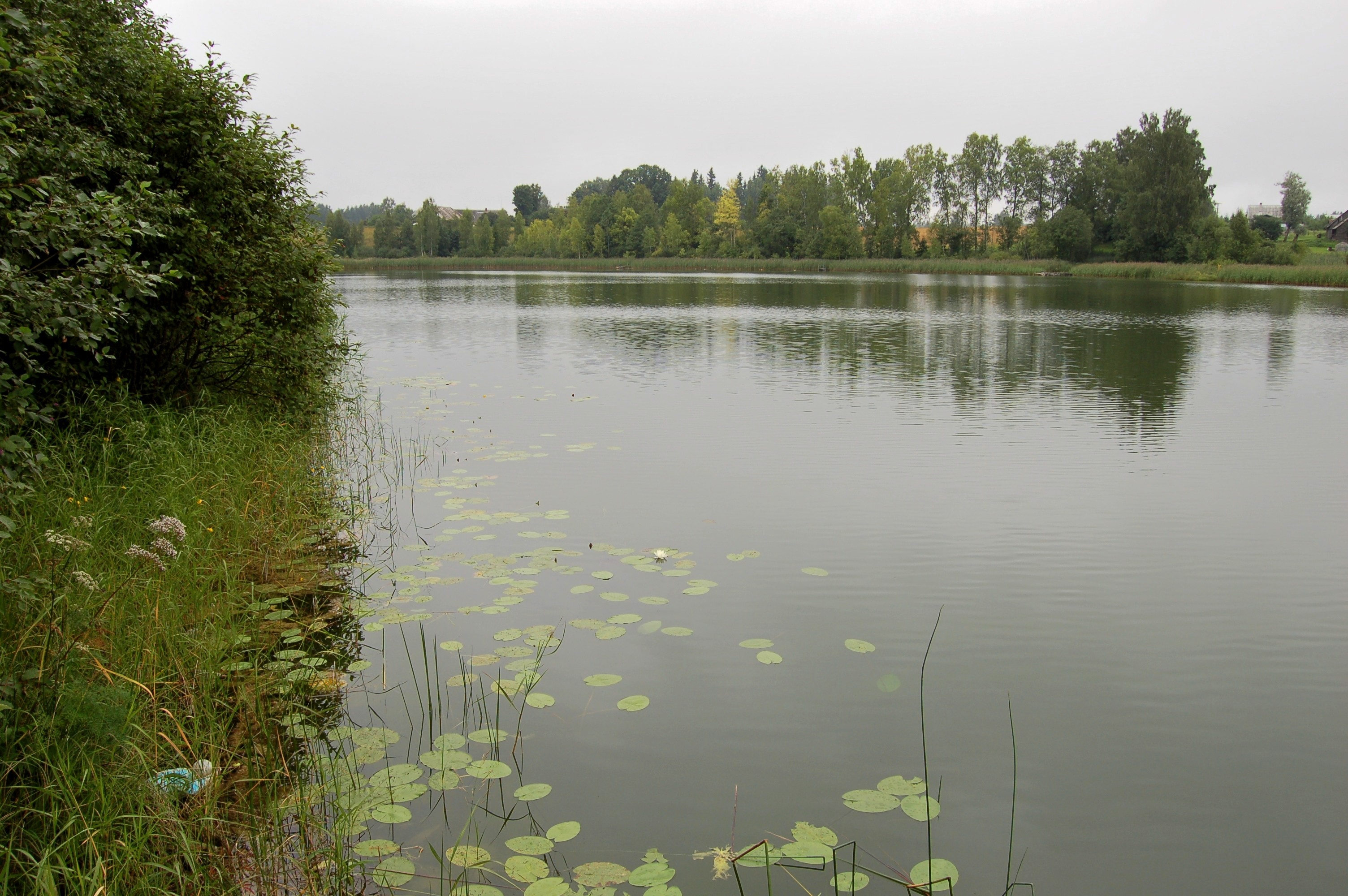
Sinialliku lake

== Notable people ==
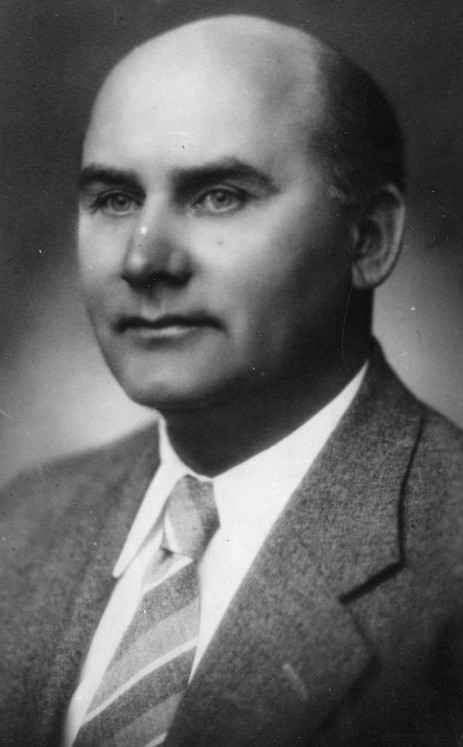
Johannes Vares, 1942

- Raimund von zur-Mühlen (1854 in Uusna – 1931), tenor Lieder singer, emigrated to England in 1907
- Jaan Tõnisson (1868 in Viiratsi – 1941), statesman, Prime Minister of Estonia twice 1919 and 1920
- Jüri Jaakson (1870 Karula – 1942), lawyer, statesman, president of the Bank of Estonia 1926-1940
- Mari Raamot (1872 in Kiltsi – 1966), socialist, and founder of the women's national defense movement.
- Jaan Lõo (1872 in Holstre – 1939), Supreme Court judge, poet and politician
- Mats Nõges (1879 in Kärksi – 1973), physician, editor and politician; 1915–1922 editor-in-chief of the newspaper Sakala, 1917-1918, Mayor of Viljandi
- Ado Birk (1883 in Mõnnaste – 1942), politician, the Estonian Prime Minister for two days in 1920
- Jaan Anvelt (1884 in Oorgu – 1937), a Bolshevik leader of the Communist Party of Estonia
- Johan Laidoner (1884 in Vardja – 1953), Commander of the Estonian Defence Forces
- Juhan Simm (1885 in Kivilõppe – 1959), composer, conductor, and choir director.
- Peet Aren (1889 in Odiste – 1970), painter, theatre artist and graphic artist, lived in USA after WWII
- Johannes Vares (1890 in Kiisa – 1946), poet, doctor and Prime Minister of Estonia 2 months in 1940.
- August Annist (1899 in Leie – 1972), literary and folklore scholar, writer and translator.
- Ott Kangilaski (1911 in Verilaske – 1975), printmaker, cartoonist, and journalist
- Arne Mikk (born 1934 in Pahuvere), stage director, theatre manager and teacher with the Estonian National Opera
- Märt Kubo (born 1944 in Tarvastu), theatre pedagogue, critic and politician; Minister of Culture in 1992

=== Sport ===
- Martin Klein (1884 in Tarvastu – 1947), middleweight wrestler, silver medallist at the 1912 Summer Olympics
- Karl-Romet Nõmm (born 1998 in Pärsti Parish), football goalkeeper who has played about 300 games
- Mari Liis Lillemäe (born 2000 in Viljandi Parish) footballer who has played 68 games for Estonia women
