= Pärsti Parish =

Former municipality of Estonia

Coordinates: 58°23′16″N 25°35′9″E

Pärsti Parish Pärsti vald
- Former municipality of Estonia
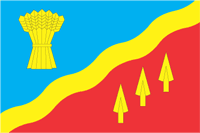
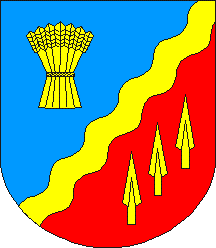
- Flag Coat of arms

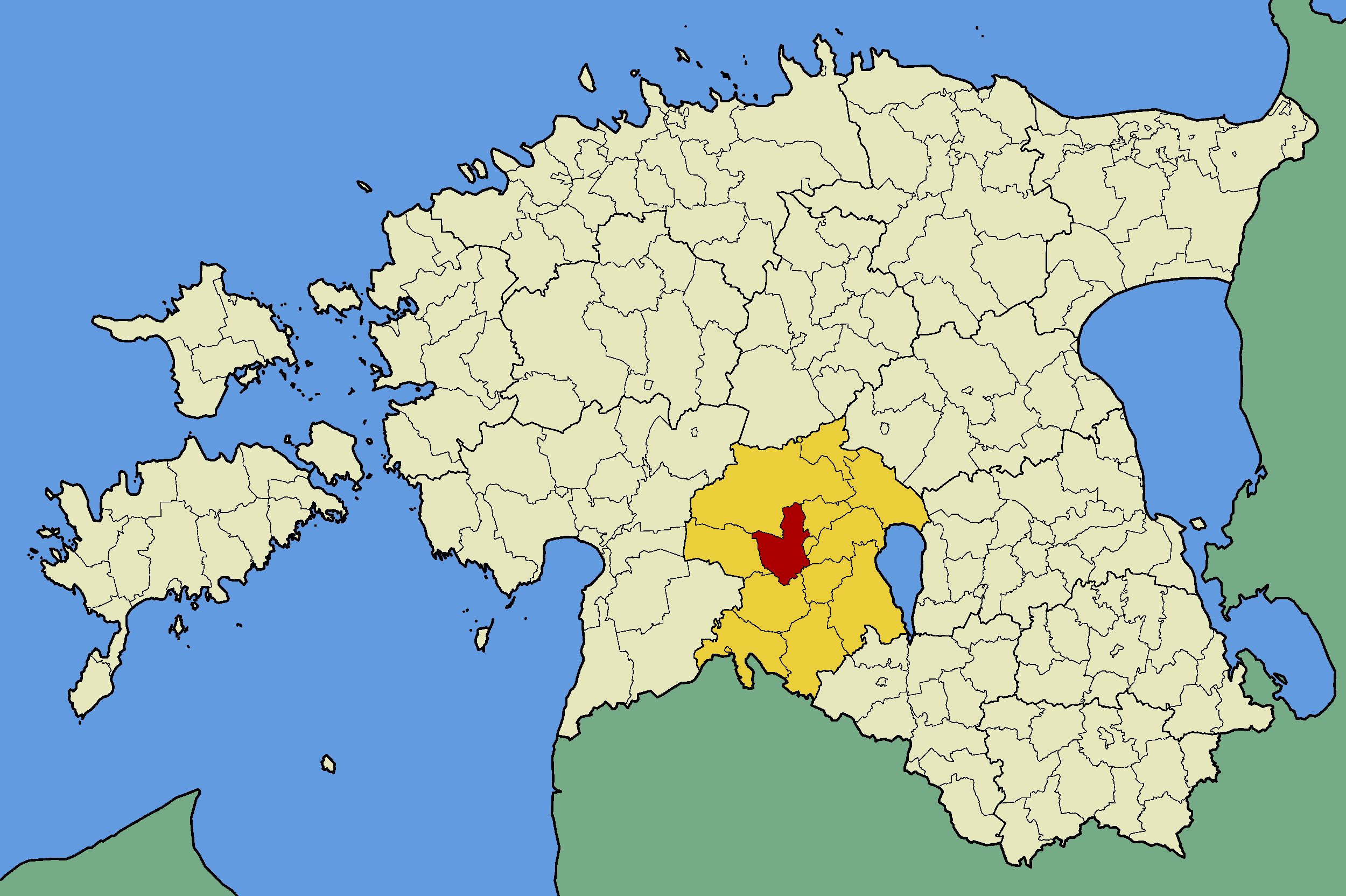
- Pärsti Parish within Viljandi County in 2009.
- Country: Estonia
- County: Viljandi County
- Administrative centre: Jämejala

Area
  - Total: 210.62 km^{2} (81.32 sq mi)

Population (01.01.2009)
  - Total: 3,824
  - Density: 18.16/km^{2} (47.02/sq mi)
- Website: www.parstivald.ee

Pärsti Parish (Estonian: Pärsti vald) was a rural municipality of Estonia, in Viljandi County.

After the municipal elections held on 20 October 2013, Pärsti Parish was merged with Paistu, Saarepeedi and Viiratsi parishes to form a new Viljandi Parish around the town of Viljandi.

On 1 January 2009, it had a population of 3,824 and an area of 210.62 km^{2}.

== Settlements ==
Small borough

Ramsi

Villages

Alustre - Heimtali - Jämejala - Kiini - Kiisa - Kingu - Kookla - Laanekuru - Leemeti - Marna - Matapera - Mustivere - Päri - Pärsti - Pinska - Puiatu - Raudna - Rihkama - Savikoti - Sinialliku - Tohvri - Tõrreküla - Turva - Väike-Kõpu - Vanamõisa - Vardi
