= Saarepeedi =

Village in Estonia

- Village
- Location in Estonia
- Coordinates: 58°25′59″N 25°41′7″E
- Country: Estonia
- County: Viljandi County
- Municipality: Viljandi Parish

Population (01.01.2010)
  - Total: 336

Saarepeedi is a village in Viljandi Parish, Viljandi County, Estonia. Until October 2013 it was the administrative centre of Saarepeedi Parish. Saarepeedi has a population of 336 (as of 1 January 2010).
