= Saarepeedi Parish =

Former municipality of Estonia

Coordinates: 58°25′51″N 25°41′3″E

Saarepeedi Parish Saarepeedi vald
- Former municipality of Estonia
- Flag Coat of arms

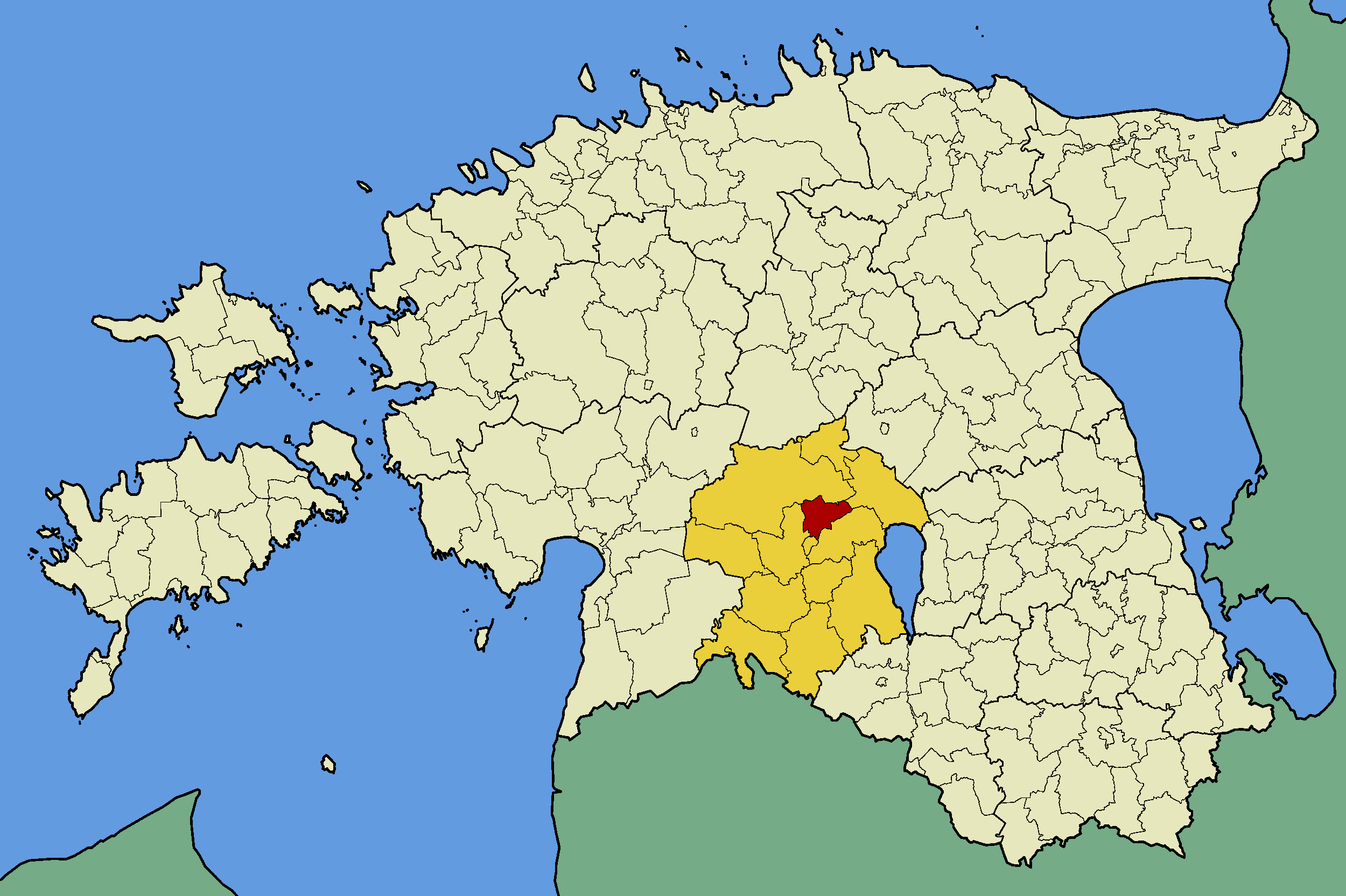
- Saarepeedi Parish within Viljandi County in 2009.
- Country: Estonia
- County: Viljandi County
- Administrative centre: Saarepeedi

Area
  - Total: 98.3 km^{2} (38.0 sq mi)

Population (2006)
  - Total: 1,222
  - Density: 12.4/km^{2} (32.2/sq mi)
- Website: www.saarepeedi.ee

Saarepeedi Parish was a municipality in south-western Estonia, in Viljandi County.

After the municipal elections held on 20 October 2013, Saarepeedi Parish was merged with Paistu, Pärsti, and Viiratsi parishes to form a new Viljandi Parish around the town of Viljandi.

== History ==
Saarepeedi neighborhood was populated 11th-12th century. there were Naanu fort, which speak of findings that have been used as a fortress of 12th-13th century. was first mentioned 1583.

== Settlements ==
Villages in this area include: Aindu, Auksi, Karula, Kokaviidika, Moori, Peetrimõisa, Saarepeedi, Taari, Tobraselja, Tõnissaare, Välgita and Võistre.
