= Sinialliku =

Village in Estonia

- Village
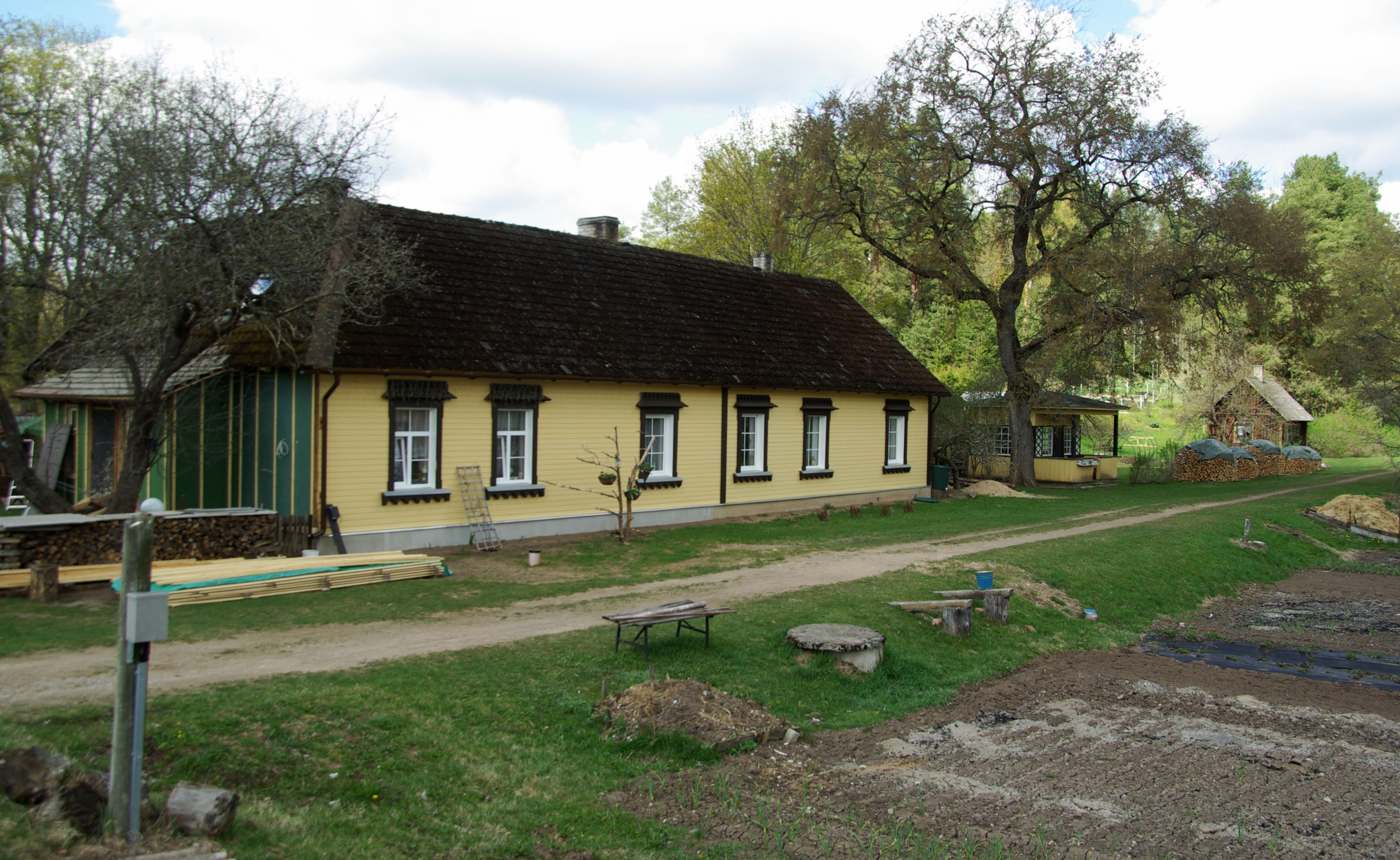
- Former train station in Sinialliku

- Location within Estonia
- Coordinates: 58.310277777778°N 25.556388888889°E
- Country: Estonia
- County: Viljandi County
- Parish: Viljandi Parish
- Time zone: UTC+2 (EET)
  - Summer (DST): UTC+3 (EEST)

Sinialliku is a village in Viljandi Parish, Viljandi County in Estonia. It was a part of Pärsti Parish until 2013.
