= Vana-Võidu =

Village in Estonia

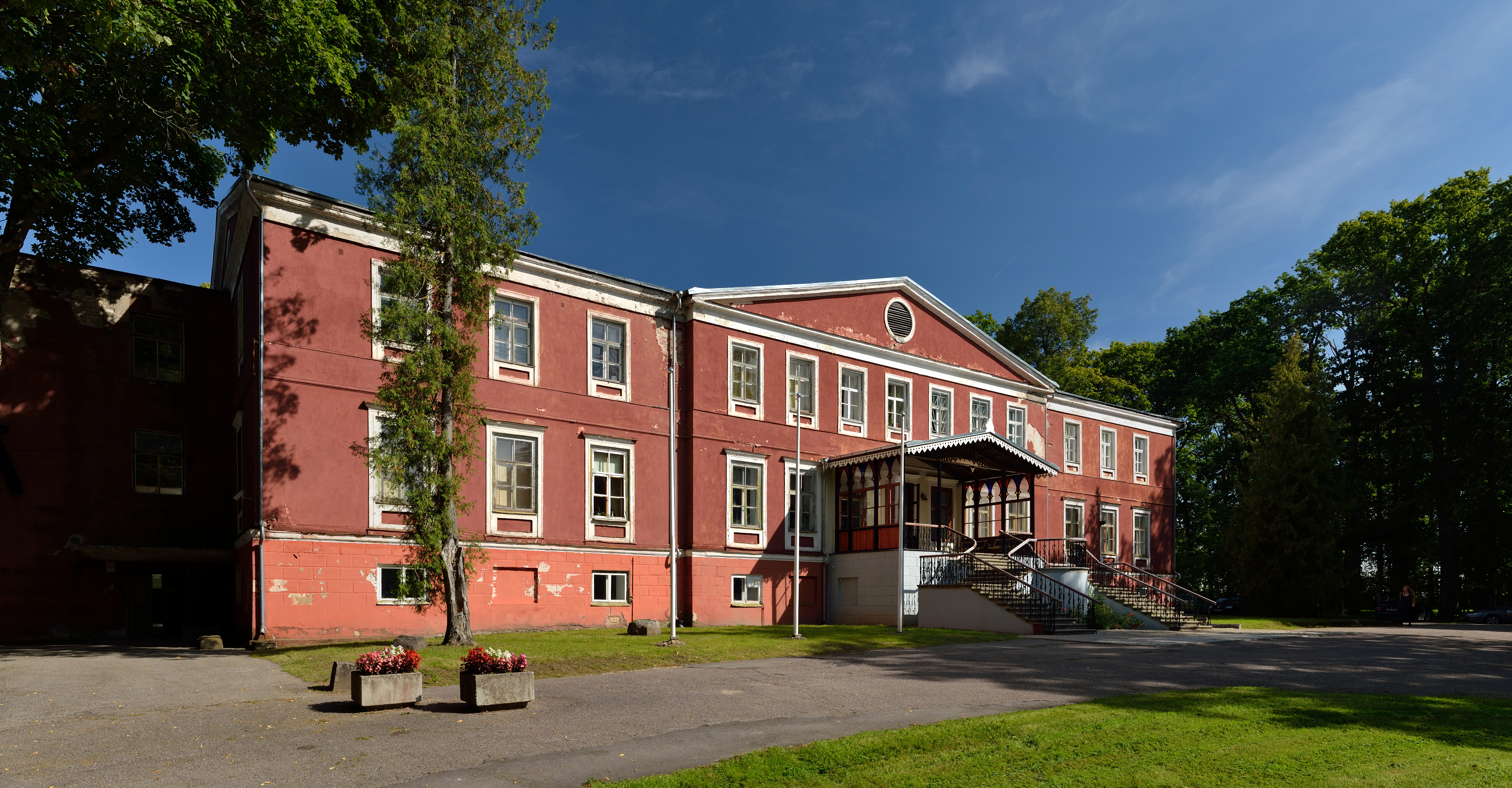
- Vana-Võidu Manor

- Location within Estonia
- Coordinates: 58°23′26″N 25°39′15″E
- Country: Estonia
- County: Viljandi County
- Municipality: Viljandi Parish
- Time zone: UTC+2 (EET)

Vana-Võidu (German: Alt-Woidoma) is a settlement in Viljandi Parish, Viljandi County in southern Estonia. It was a part of Viiratsi Parish before 2013.

Olympic wrestler Küllo Kõiv (1972–1998) was born in Vana-Võidu.

== Gallery ==
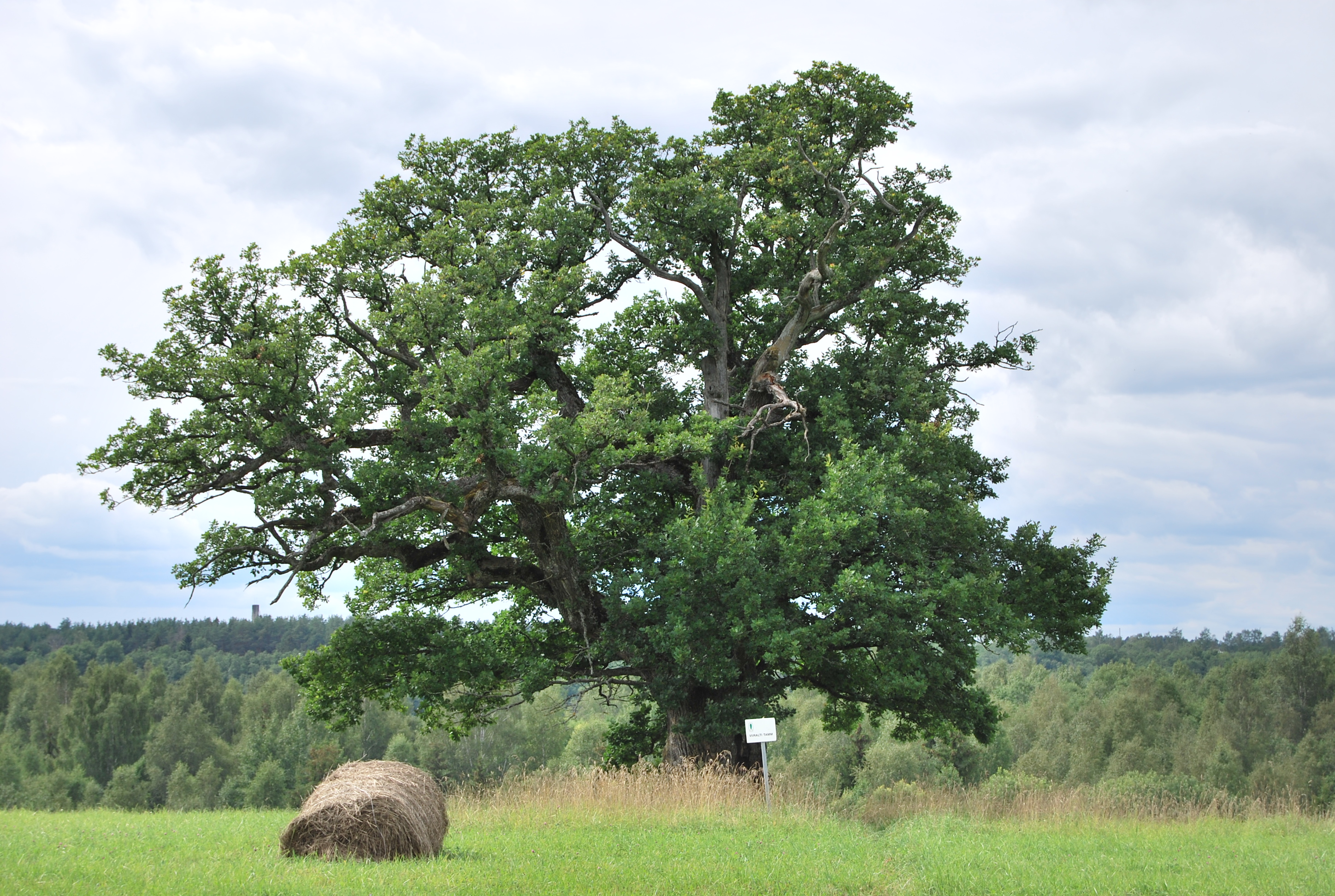
Viiralt's oak

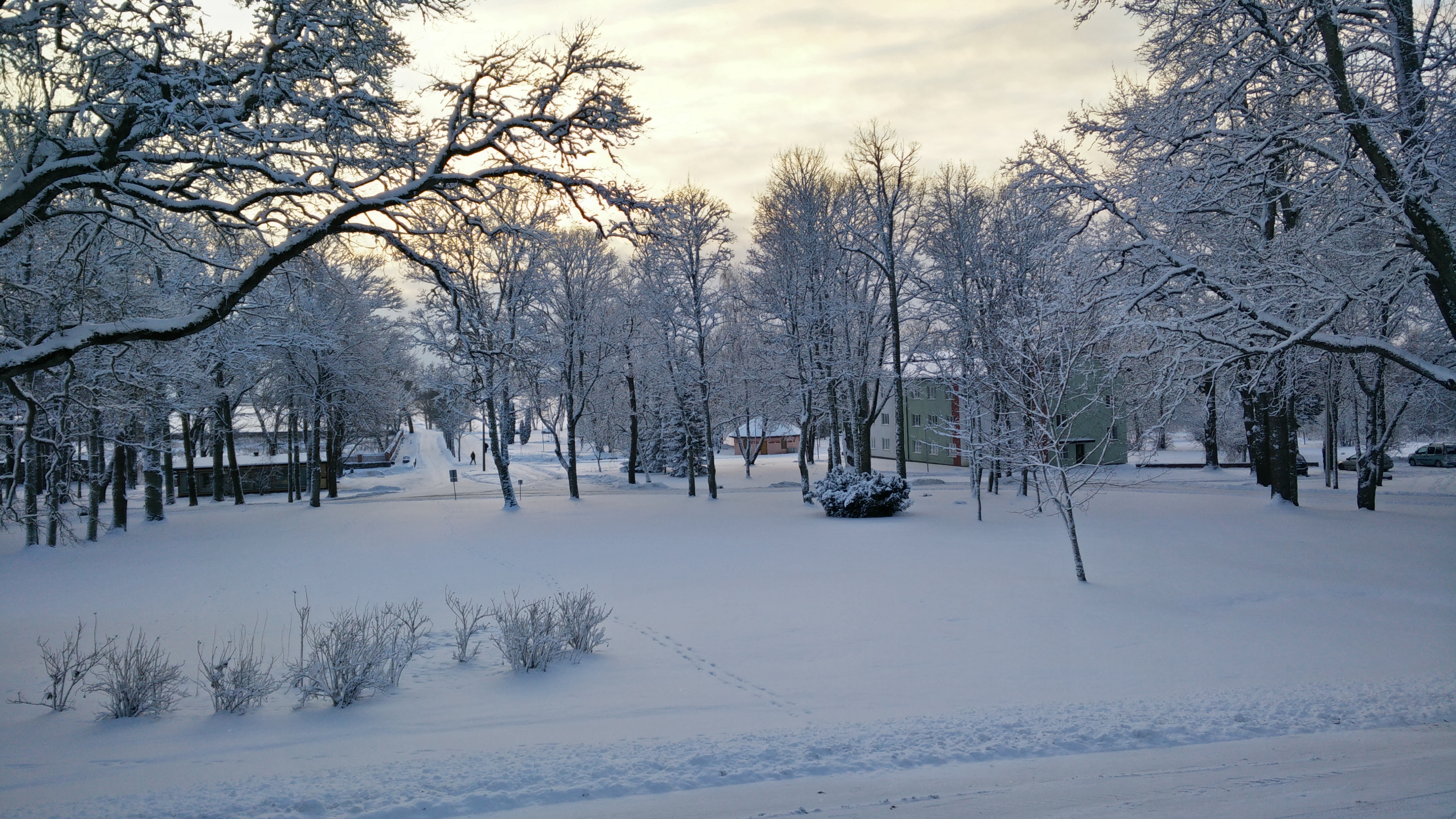
Park in front of Vana-Võidu manor
