= Heimtali =

Village in Estonia

- Village
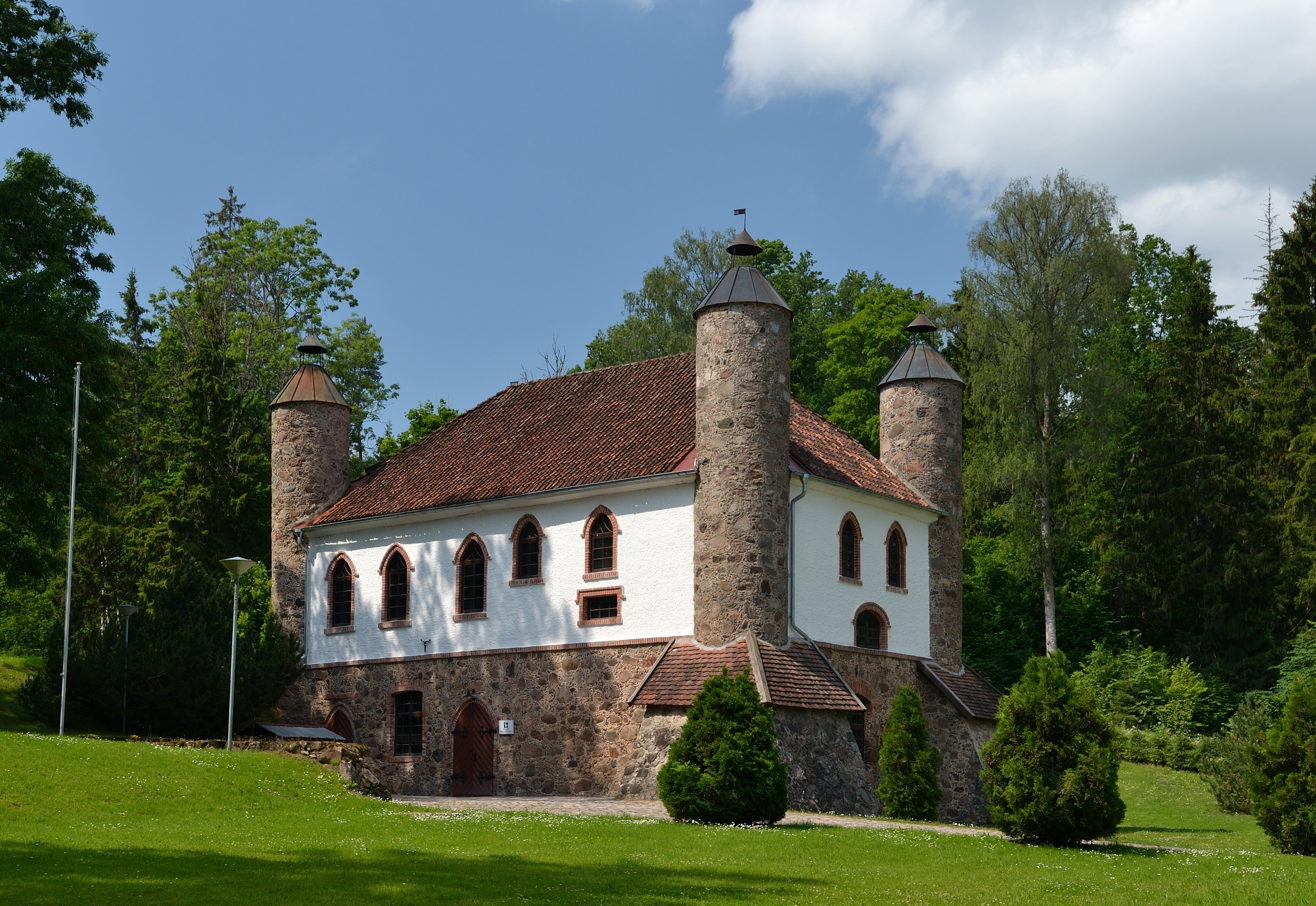
- Heimtali manor's cheese dairy

- Location in Estonia
- Coordinates: 58°19′11″N 25°30′1″E
- Country: Estonia
- County: Viljandi County
- Municipality: Viljandi Parish

Population (04.01.2010)
  - Total: 235

Heimtali is a village in Viljandi Parish, Viljandi County, Estonia. It has a population of 235 (as of 4 January 2010). It was a part of Pärsti Parish until 2013.

== Heimtali Manor ==
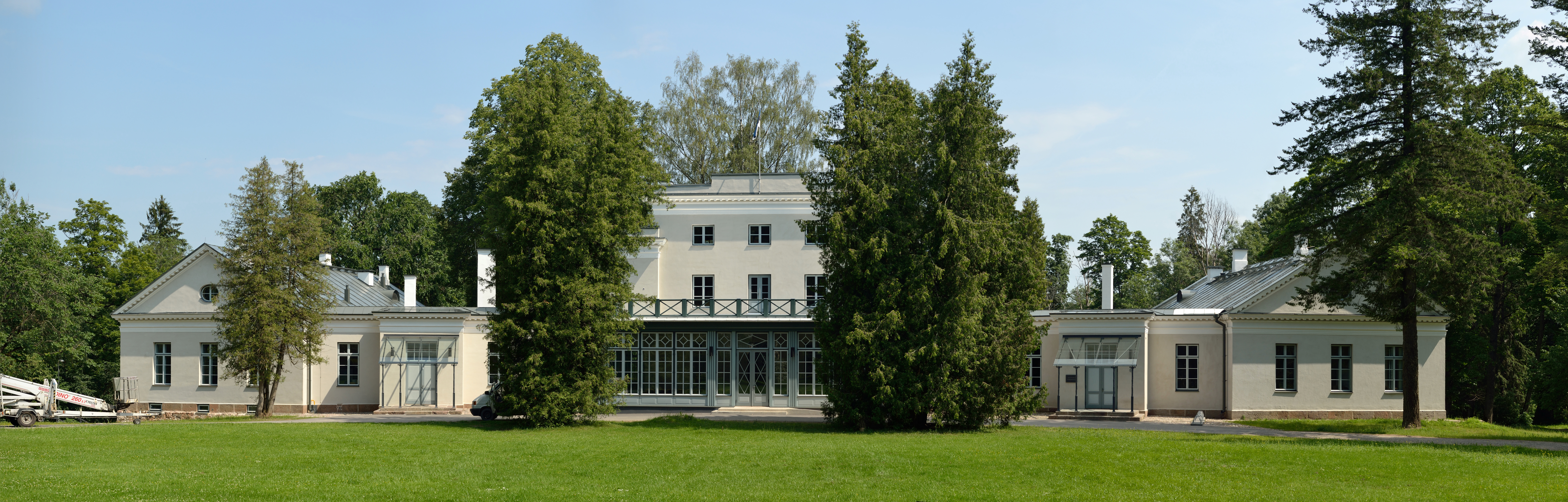
Heimtali manor house main building.

Heimtali estate (German: Heimtal, Heimthal) has a history that goes back to at least 1528, when it is mentioned in written sources for the first time. It was the property of the Baltic German local aristocratic family von Sivers for most of its history. The current main building dates from 1855-1857 and was designed by the owner at the time, Peter Reinhold von Sivers. In its heyday during the 19th century, the manor house complex supported over 40 outbuildings and was surrounded by a park. Of the outbuildings, the peculiar former cheese dairy has been renovated. The von Sivers family burial ground is still located nearby.

== See also ==
- List of palaces and manor houses in Estonia
