= Vardja, Viljandi County =

Village in Estonia

- Village
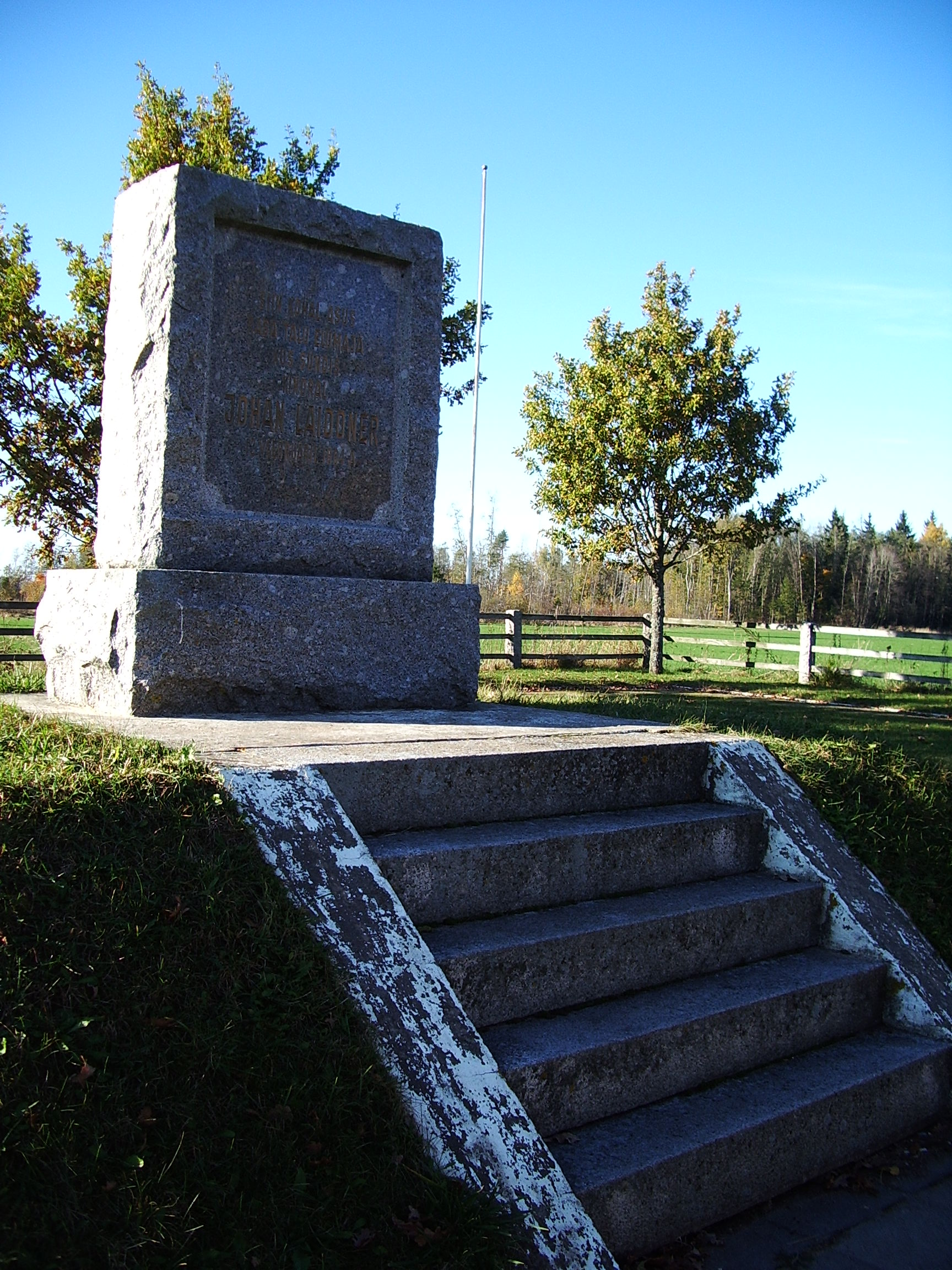
- Monument to Johan Laidoner at his birthplace of Raba farm in Vardja

- Location within Estonia
- Coordinates: 58.328333333333°N 25.613055555556°E
- Country: Estonia
- County: Viljandi County
- Parish: Viljandi Parish

Population (2020)
  - Total: 213
- Time zone: UTC+2 (EET)
  - Summer (DST): UTC+3 (EEST)

Vardja is a village in Viljandi Parish, Viljandi County in Estonia.

Vardja is the birthplace of statesman and military general Johan Laidoner (1884–1953).
