= Tohvri, Viljandi County =

Village in Estonia

Tohvri
- Village
- Location in Estonia
- Coordinates: 58°23′38″N 25°21′23″E
- Country: Estonia
- County: Viljandi County
- Municipality: Viljandi Parish

Population (04.01.2010)
  - Total: 97

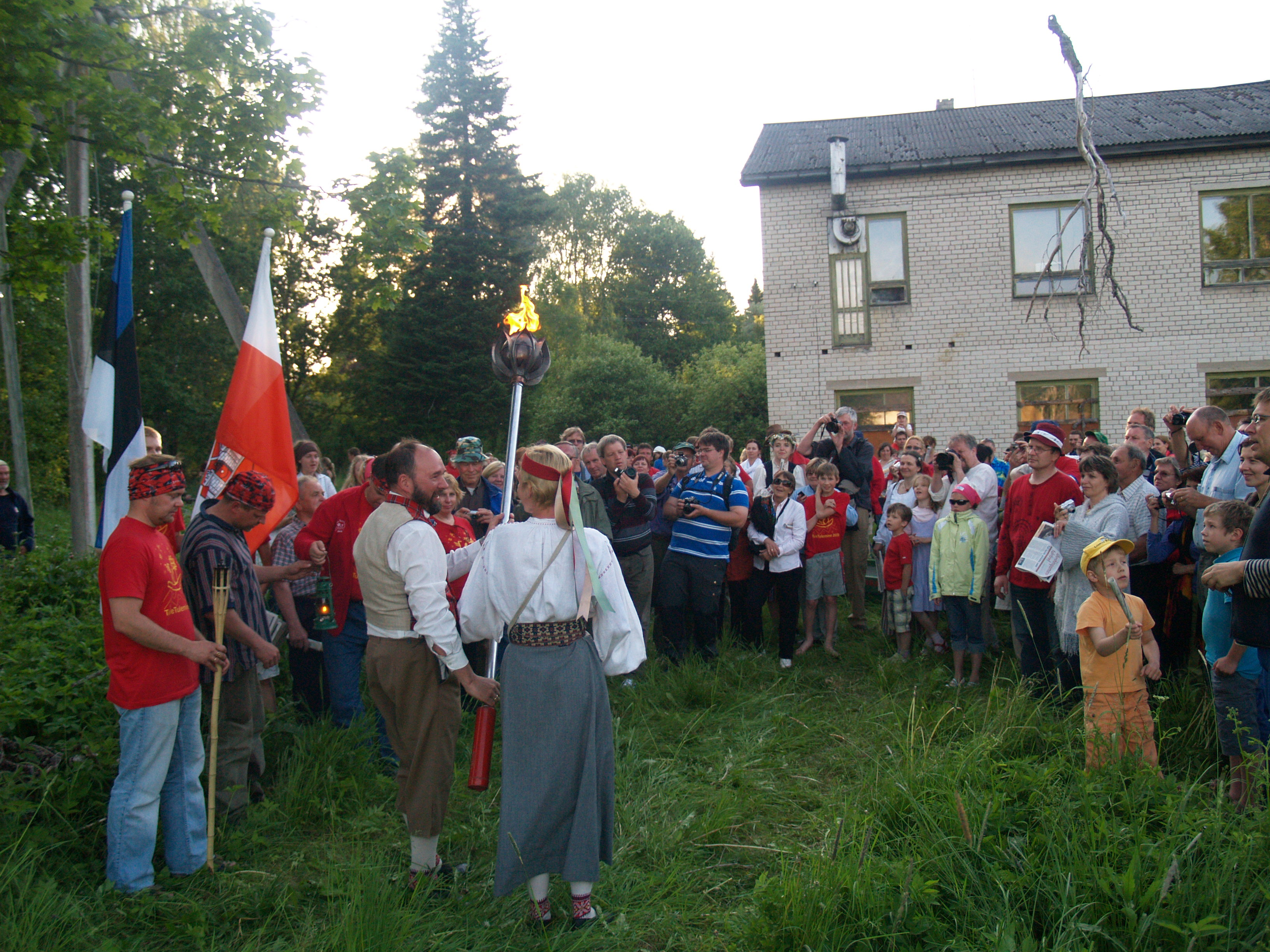
Song Festival fire in Tohvri village

Tohvri is a village in Viljandi Parish, Viljandi County, Estonia. It has a population of 97 (as of 4 January 2010). It was a part of Pärsti Parish until 2013.
