= Pärsti =

Village in Estonia

- Village
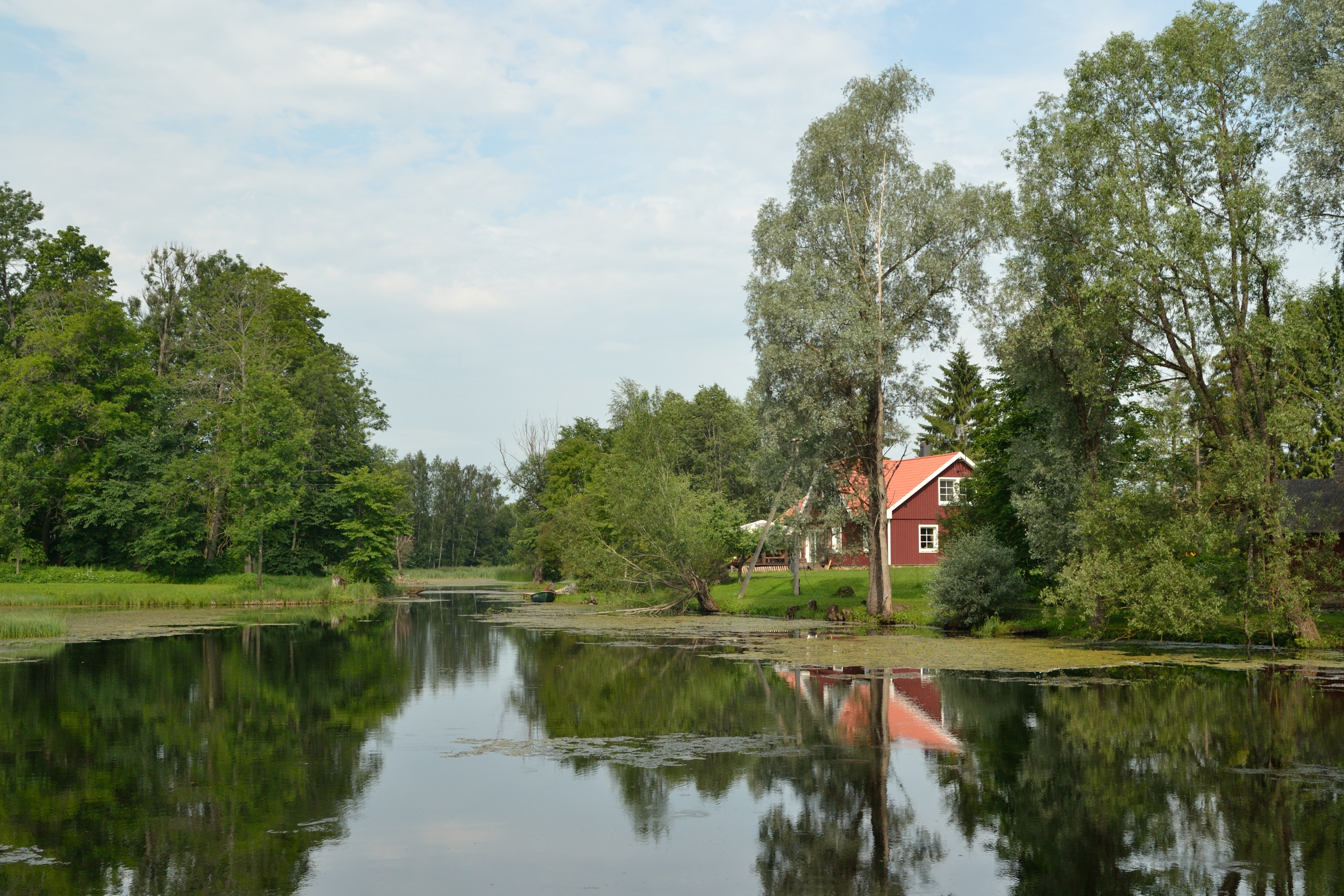
- Pärsti impounded lake

- Location in Estonia
- Coordinates: 58°19′18″N 25°27′37″E
- Country: Estonia
- County: Viljandi County
- Municipality: Viljandi Parish

Population (04.01.2010)
  - Total: 164

Pärsti (German: Perst) is a village in Viljandi Parish, Viljandi County, Estonia. It has a population of 164 (as of 4 January 2010).

Javelin thrower Risto Mätas (born 1984) was born in Pärsti.

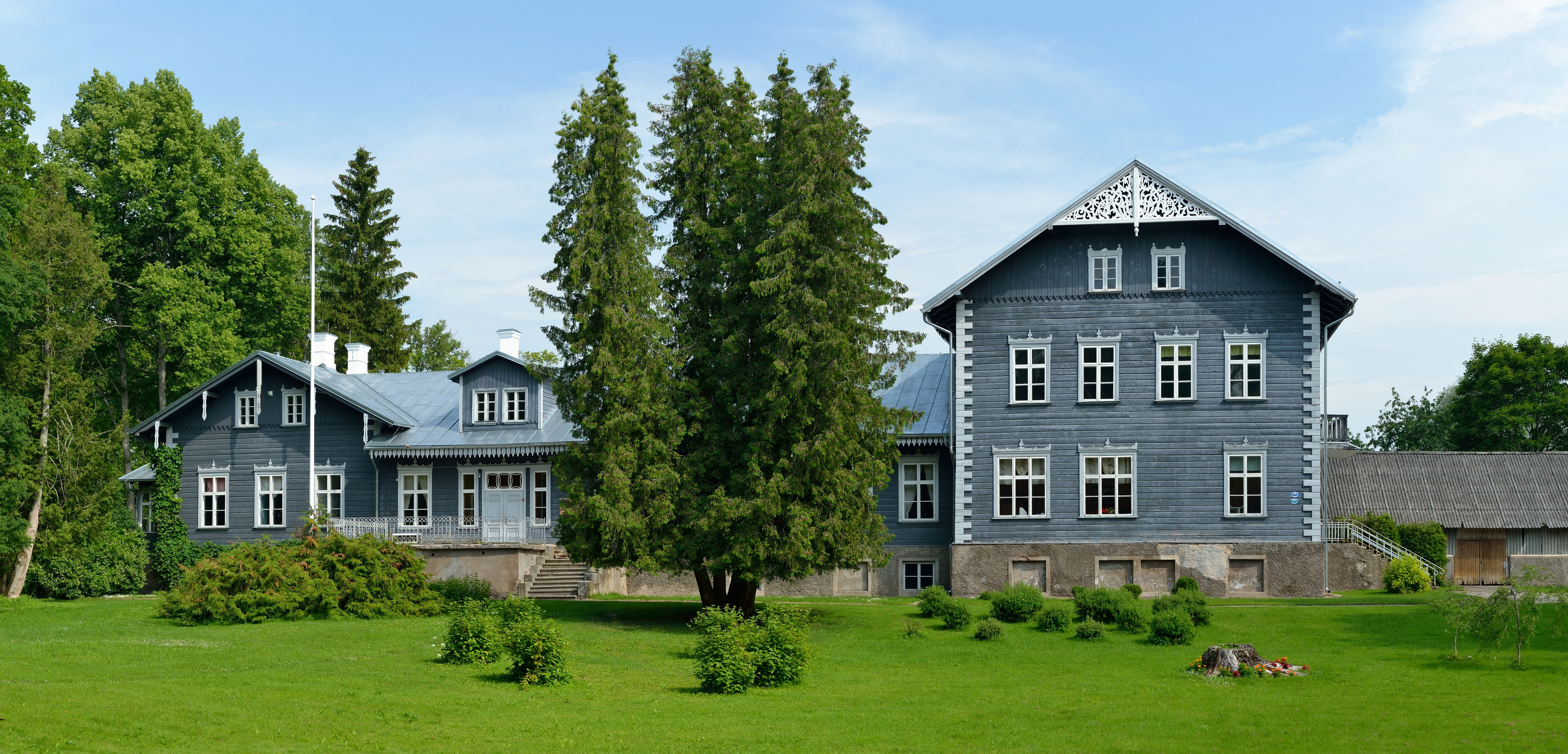
Pärsti manor main building

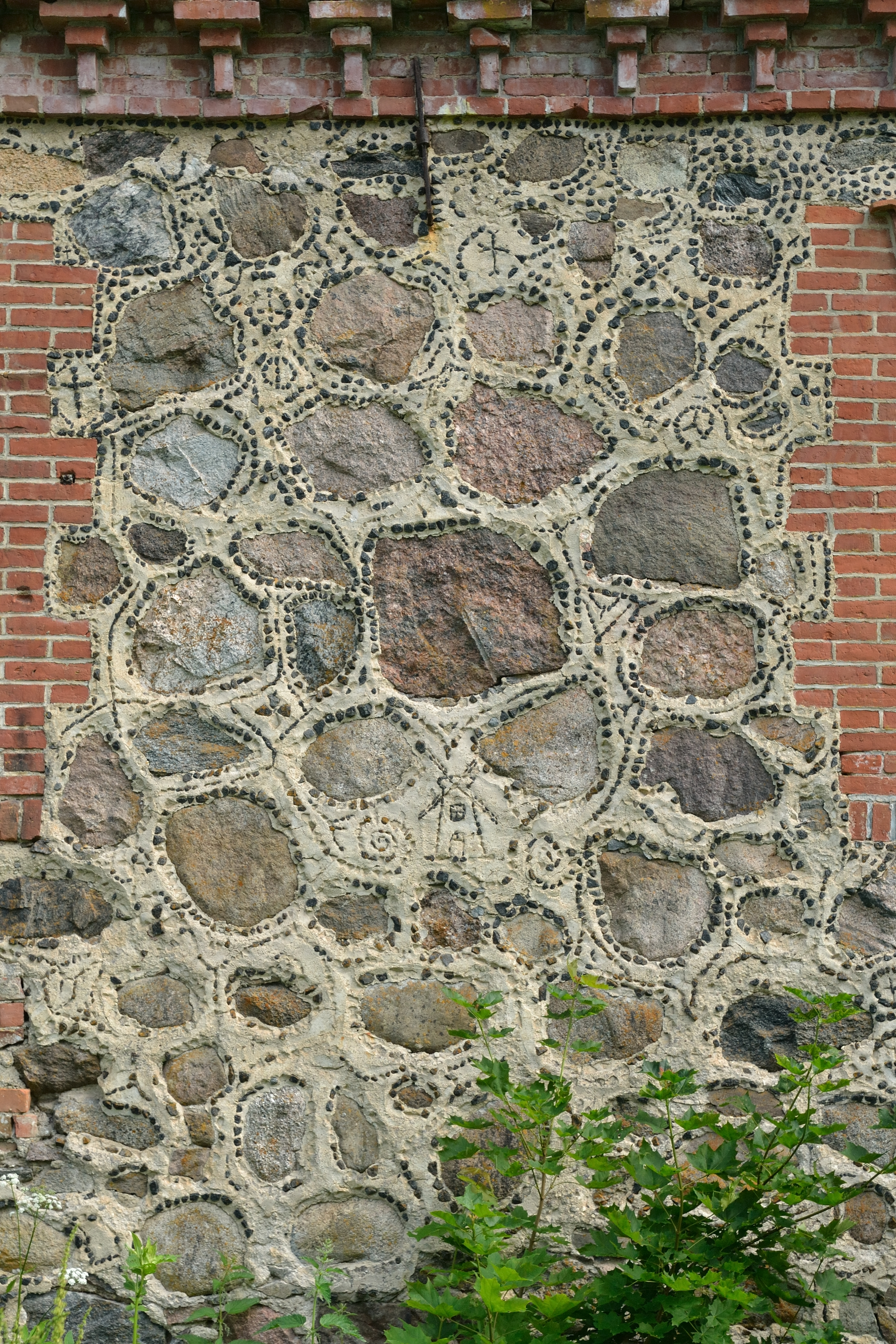
Pärsti manor windmill wall

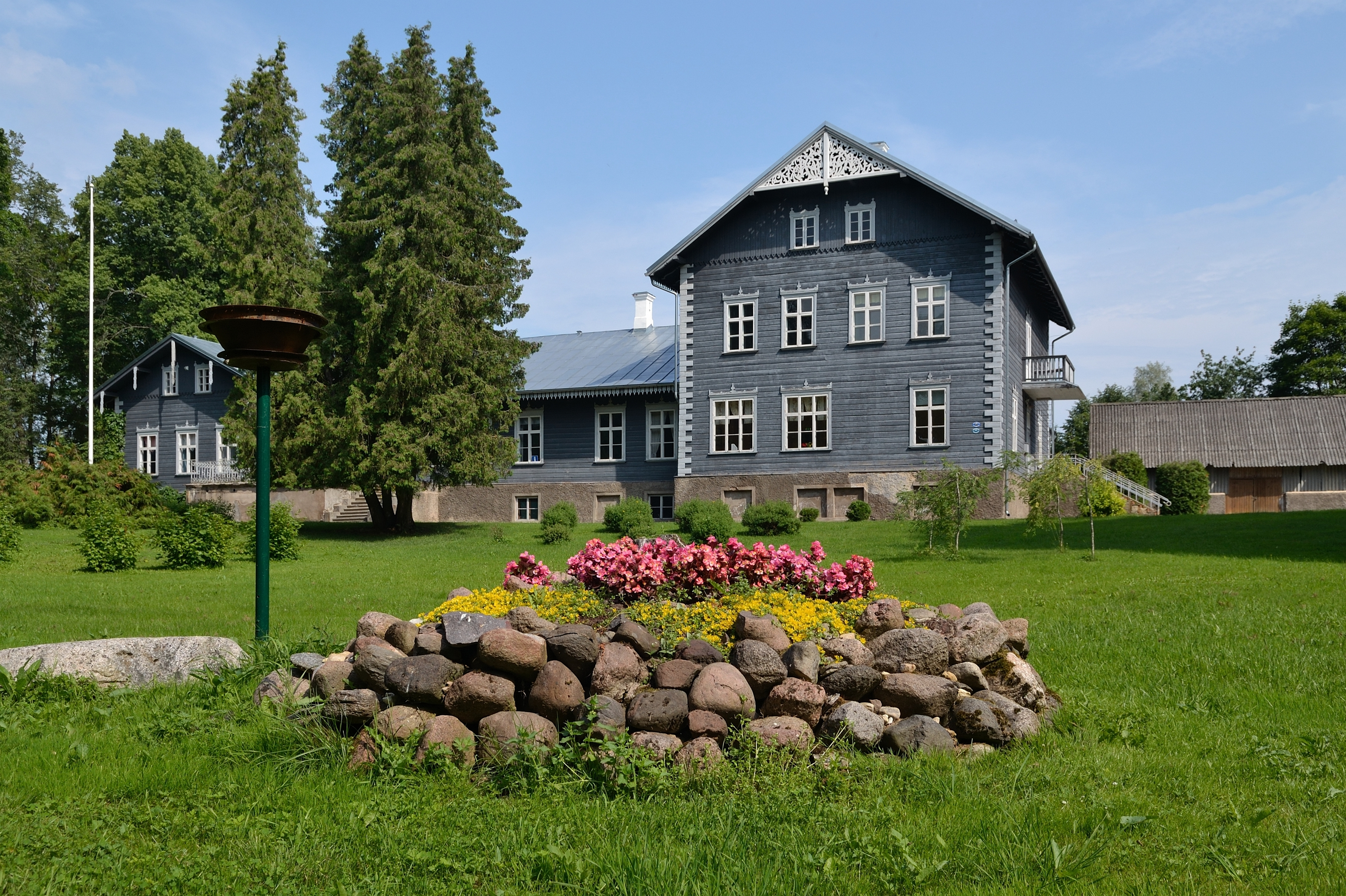
Manor park

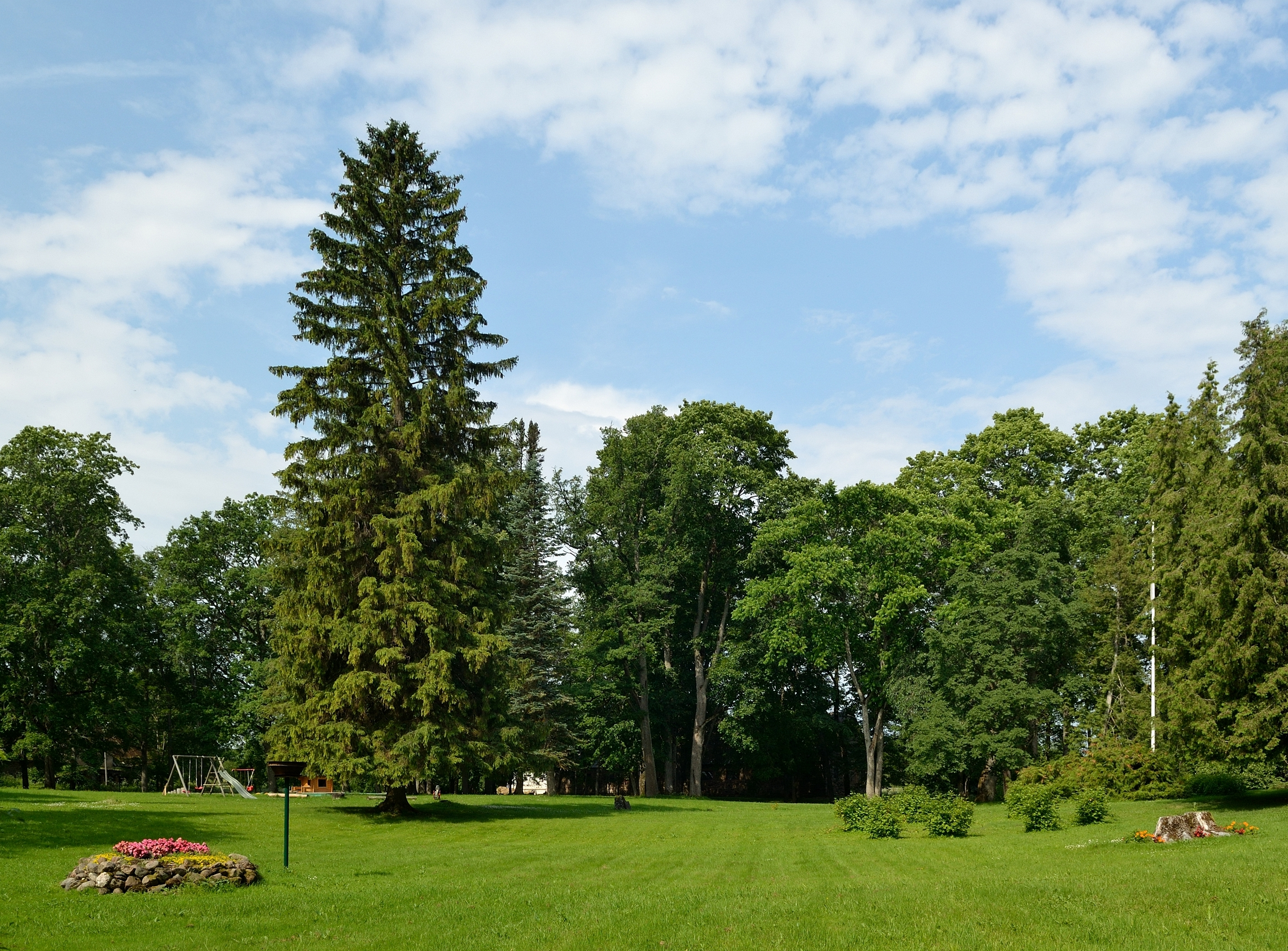
Manor park
