= Tarvastu Parish =

Former municipality of Estonia

Coordinates: 58°14′6″N 25°51′48″E

Tarvastu Parish Tarvastu vald
- Former municipality of Estonia
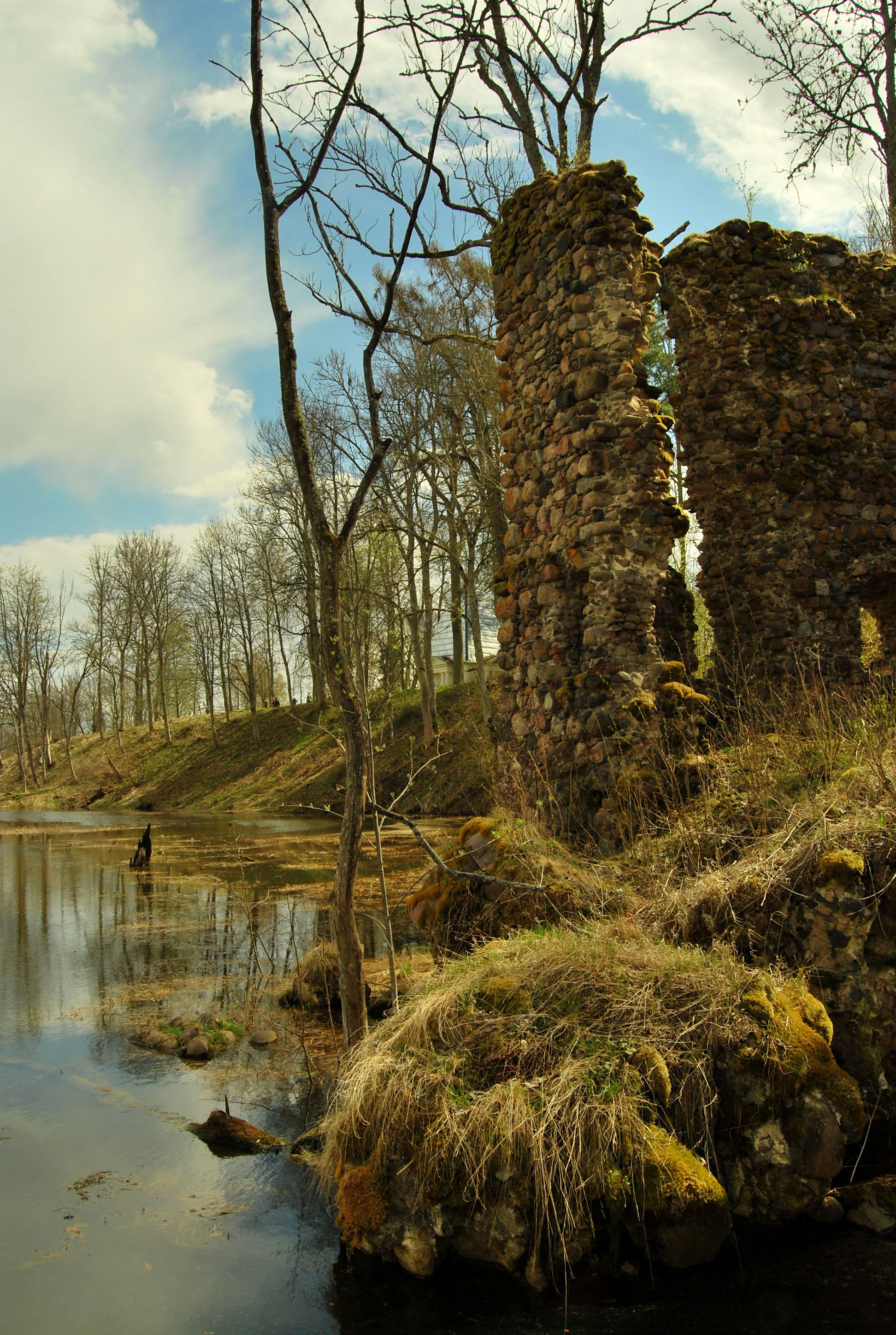
- Ruins of Tarvastu Castle

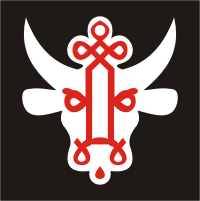
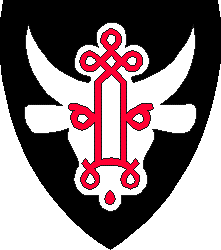
- Flag Coat of arms

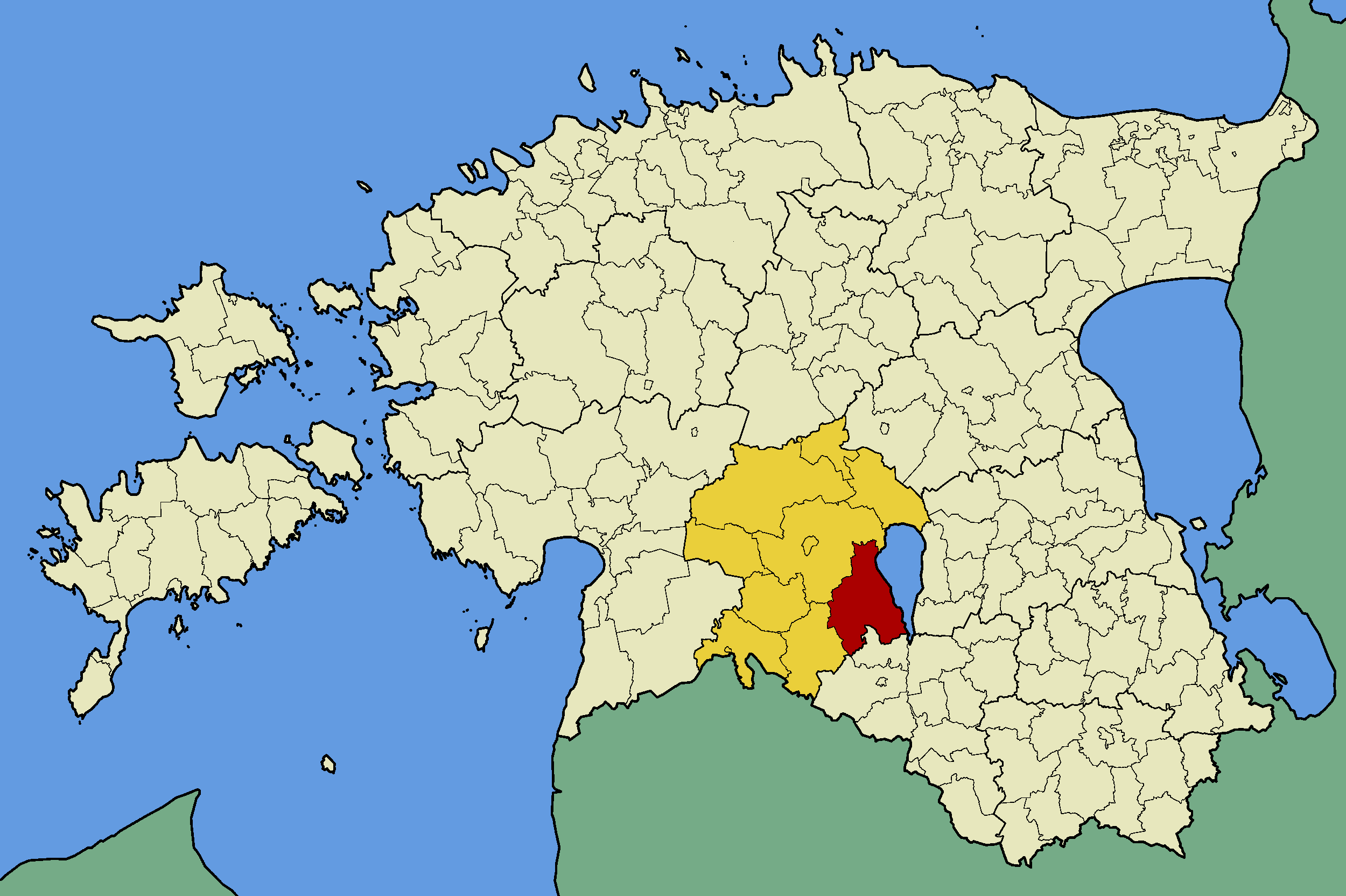
- Tarvastu Parish within Viljandi County.
- Country: Estonia
- County: Viljandi County
- Administrative centre: Mustla

Area
  - Total: 409.00 km^{2} (157.92 sq mi)

Population (01.01.2009)
  - Total: 4,216
  - Density: 10.31/km^{2} (26.70/sq mi)
- Website: tarvastu.ee

Tarvastu Parish (Estonian: Tarvastu vald) was a rural municipality of Estonia, in Viljandi County. It had a population of 4,216 (as of 1 January 2009) and an area of 409.00 km².

== Settlements ==
Small borough

Mustla

Villages

Ämmuste – Anikatsi – Jakobimõisa – Järveküla – Kalbuse – Kannuküla – Kärstna – Kivilõppe – Koidu – Kuressaare – Maltsa – Marjamäe – Metsla – Mõnnaste – Muksi – Pahuvere – Pikru – Põrga – Porsa – Raassilla – Riuma – Roosilla – Soe – Sooviku – Suislepa – Tagamõisa – Tarvastu – Tinnikuru – Ülensi – Unametsa – Väluste – Vanausse – Veisjärve – Vilimeeste – Villa – Vooru

== See also ==
- Järveküla Nature Reserve
- Õhne river
- Suislepa Airfield
- Tarvastu Castle
- Veisjärv
- Võrtsjärv
