= Kalbuse =

Village in Estonia

- Village
- Location in Estonia
- Coordinates: 58°16′45″N 25°52′31″E
- Country: Estonia
- County: Viljandi County
- Municipality: Viljandi Parish

Population (2011)
  - Total: 18

Kalbuse is a village in Viljandi Parish, Viljandi County, Estonia. Until the 2017 administrative reform of Estonian municipalities the village was located in Tarvastu Parish. Kalbus is located 19 km (11.8 miles) southeast of the town of Viljandi, 5.5 km (3.4 miles) northwest of the small borough of Mustla, near the western shore of Lake Võrtsjärv. Neighboring villages include Vanausse, Mõnnaste, Koidu and Väluste. As of 2011, Kalbuse had a population of 18, a steep decline from 59 in the 2000 census.
