= Pikru =

Village in Estonia

- Village
- Location in Estonia
- Coordinates: 58°11′53″N 25°51′54″E
- Country: Estonia
- County: Viljandi County
- Municipality: Viljandi Parish
  - Density: 42/km^{2} (110/sq mi)

Pikru is a village in Viljandi Parish, Viljandi County, Estonia. Until the 2017 administrative reform of Estonian municipalities the village was located in Tarvastu Parish. Pikru located 24 km (15 miles) southeast of the village of Viljandi, 3.9 km (2.4 miles) south of the small borough of Mustla, near the western shore of Lake Võrtsjärv. Neighboring villages include Jakobimõisa, Ämmuste, Unametsa and Soe. As of 2011, the population of Pikru was 42, a decrease from 61 in the 2000 census.
