= Marjamäe =

Village in Estonia

- Village
- Location in Estonia
- Coordinates: 58°07′53″N 25°58′33″E
- Country: Estonia
- County: Viljandi County
- Municipality: Viljandi Parish

Population (2011)
  - Total: 16

Marjamäe is a village in Viljandi Parish, Viljandi County, Estonia. Until the 2017 administrative reform of Estonian municipalities the village was located in Tarvastu Parish. Marjamäe is located 34 km (21 miles) southeast of the town of Viljandi, 12.8 km (7.9 miles) southeast of the small borough of Mustla, on the border of Viljandi County and Valga County. Neighboring villages include Suislepa, Maltsa and Vooru. As of 2011, the population of Marjamäe was 16, a decrease from 29 in the 2000 census.
