= Metsla, Viljandi County =

Village in Estonia

Metsla
- Village
- Location in Estonia
- Coordinates: 58°15′27″N 25°46′01″E
- Country: Estonia
- County: Viljandi County
- Municipality: Viljandi Parish

Population (2011)
  - Total: 38

Metsla (locally, Mõtsla) is a village in Viljandi Parish, Viljandi County, Estonia. Until the 2017 administrative reform of Estonian municipalities the village was located in Tarvastu Parish. Metsla is located 16 km (9.9 miles) southeast of the town of Viljandi, 7 km (4 miles) northwest of the small borough of Mustla. Neighboring villages include, Vilimeeste, Raassilla and Ülensi. As of 2011, the population of Metsla was 38, a decrease from 55 in the 2000 census.

Metsla is the birthplace of Estonian poet and linguist Mihkel Veske (1843-1890).
