= Muksi =

Village in Estonia

- Village
- Location in Estonia
- Coordinates: 58°09′25″N 25°43′37″E
- Country: Estonia
- County: Viljandi County
- Municipality: Viljandi Parish

Population (2011)
  - Total: 15

Muksi is a village in Viljandi Parish, Viljandi County, Estonia. Until the 2017 administrative reform of Estonian municipalities the village was located in Tarvastu Parish. Muksi is located 24 km (15 miles) southeast of the town of Viljandi, 11.8 km (7.3 miles) southwest of the small borough of Mustla. Neighboring villages include Anikatsi, Pahuvere and Kannuküla. As of 2011, Muksi had a population of 15, a decrease from 20 in the 2000 census.
