= Sooviku =

Village in Estonia

- Village
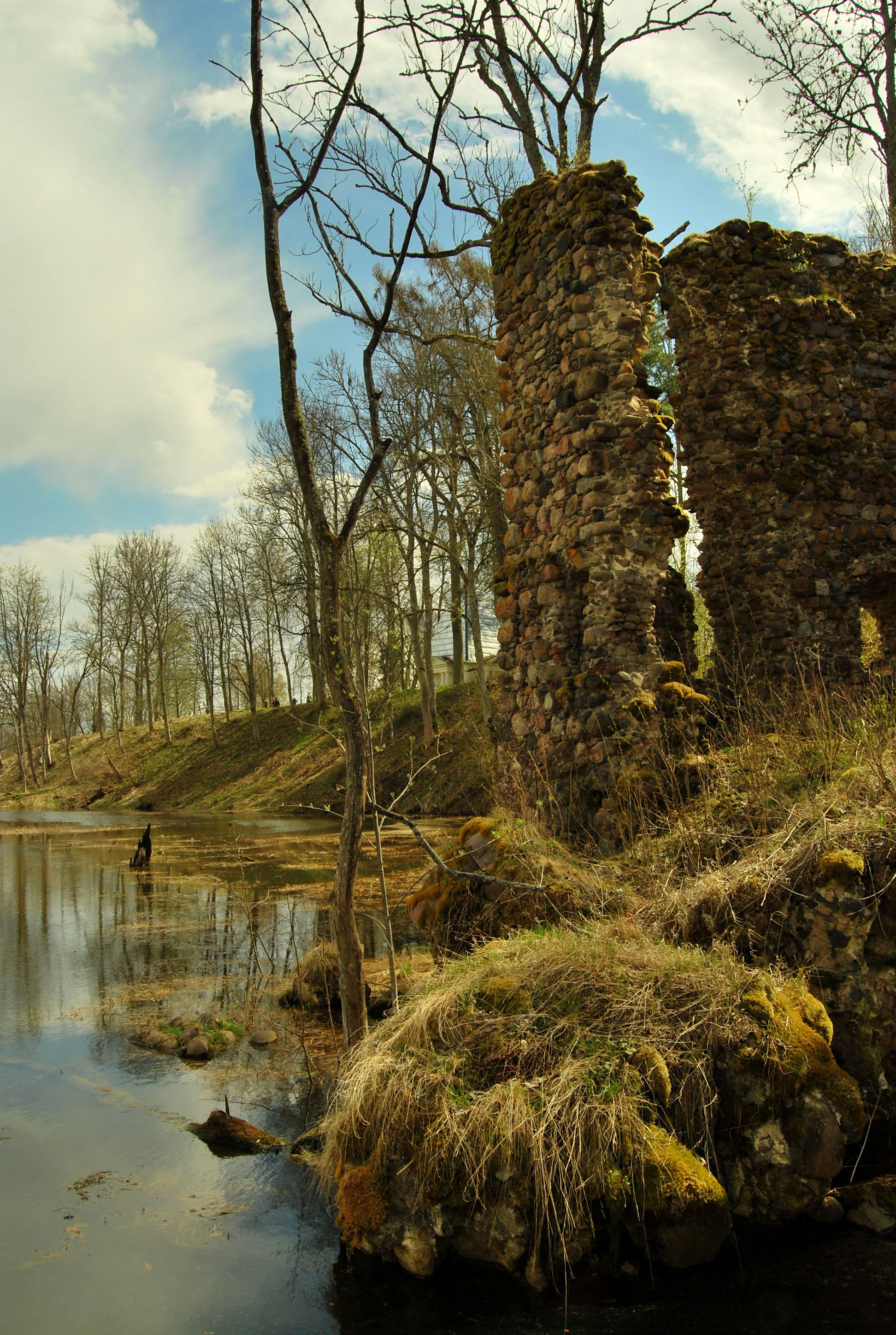
- Ruins of Tarvastu Castle

- Location in Estonia
- Coordinates: 58°14′43″N 25°53′48″E
- Country: Estonia
- County: Viljandi County
- Municipality: Viljandi Parish

Population (2011)
  - Total: 34

Sooviku is a village in Viljandi Parish, Viljandi County, Estonia. Until the 2017 administrative reform of Estonian municipalities the village was located in Tarvastu Parish. Sooviku is located 22 km (13.6 miles) southeast of the town of Viljandi, 2.2 km (1.3 miles) northwest of the small borough of Mustla, near the western shore of Lake Võrtsjärv. Neighboring villages include Porsa, Tarvastu, Villa and Vanausse. Sooviku had a population of 34 as of 2011, a decrease from 69 in the 2000 census.

The ruins of the 14th century Tarvastu Castle (Estonian: Tarvastu ordulinnus) are located near the village of Sooviku.
