= Tagamõisa, Viljandi County =

Village in Estonia

Tagamõisa
- Village
- Location in Estonia
- Coordinates: 58°09′30″N 25°49′28″E
- Country: Estonia
- County: Viljandi County
- Municipality: Viljandi Parish

Population (2011)
  - Total: 27

Tagamõisa is a village in Viljandi Parish, Viljandi County, Estonia. Until the 2017 administrative reform of Estonian municipalities the village was located in Tarvastu Parish. Tagamõisa is located 26 km (16 miles) southeast of the town of Viljandi, 9.4 km (5 miles) southwest of the small borough of Mustla, near the southern Viljandi County and Valga County borders. Neighboring villages include Ämmuste, Anikatsi and Roosilla. Tagamõisa had a population of 27 as of 2011, a decrease from 37 in the 2000 census.
