= Koidu, Viljandi County =

Village in Estonia

Koidu
- Village
- Location in Estonia
- Coordinates: 58°14′59″N 25°49′42″E
- Country: Estonia
- County: Viljandi County
- Municipality: Viljandi Parish

Population (2011)
  - Total: 66

Koidu is a village in Viljandi Parish, Viljandi County, Estonia. Until the 2017 administrative reform of Estonian municipalities the village was located in Tarvastu Parish. Koidu is located 19 km (11.8 miles) southeast of the village of Viljandi, 2.6 km (1.6 miles) northwest of the small borough of Mustla, near the western shore of Lake Võrtsjärv. Neighboring villages include Ülensi, Vanausse and Porsa. The population of Koidu as of 2011 was 66, a decrease from 91 in the 2000 census.
