= Roosilla =

Village in Estonia

- Village
- Location in Estonia
- Coordinates: 58°08′45″N 25°54′35″E
- Country: Estonia
- County: Viljandi County
- Municipality: Viljandi Parish

Population (2011)
  - Total: 36

Roosilla is a village in Viljandi Parish, Viljandi County, Estonia. Until the 2017 administrative reform of Estonian municipalities the village was located in Tarvastu Parish. Roosilla ia located 31 km (19 miles) southeast of the town of Viljandi, 11 km (6.8) southeast of the small borough of Mustla, near the border of Viljandi County and Valga County. Neighboring villages include, Vooru, Maltsa and Suislepa. The population of Roosilla as of 2011 was 36, a decrease from 48 in the 2000 census.
