= Kuressaare, Viljandi County =

Village in Estonia

Kuressaare
- Village
- Location in Estonia
- Coordinates: 58°12′14″N 25°50′01″E
- Country: Estonia
- County: Viljandi County
- Municipality: Viljandi Parish

Population (2011)
  - Total: 67

Kuressaare is a village in Viljandi Parish, Viljandi County, Estonia. Until the 2017 administrative reform of Estonian municipalities, the village was located in Tarvastu Parish. Kuressaare is located 23 km (14) southeast of the town of Viljandi, 3.8 km (2.4 miles) southwest of the small borough of Mustla. Neighboring villages include Pikru, Ämmuste and Jakobimõisa. Kuressaare had a population of 67 as of 2011, a decrease from 85 in the 2000 census.
