= Veisjärve =

Village in Estonia

- Village
- Location in Estonia
- Coordinates: 58°06′06″N 25°46′46″E
- Country: Estonia
- County: Viljandi County
- Municipality: Viljandi Parish

Population (2011)
  - Total: 31

Veisjärve (also, simply Järve) is a village in Viljandi Parish, Viljandi County, Estonia. Until the 2017 administrative reform of Estonian municipalities the village was located in Tarvastu Parish. Veisjärve is located on the eastern shore of Lake Veisjärv, 31 km (19 miles) southeast of the town of Viljandi, 12 km (7 miles) southeast of the small borough of Mustla. Neighboring villages include Põrga, Kannuküla, Mäeküla and Kärstna. As of 2011, Veisjärve had a population of 31, a decrease from 66 in the 2000 census.

== Notable people ==
Notable people that were born or lived in Veisjärve include the following:

- Hendrik Adamson (1891–1946), Estonian poet, born on the Patsi farm in Metsakuru, now part of Veisjärve
- Jaan Kurn (1893–1981), Estonian teacher, poet, and translator, born on the Patsi farm in Metsakuru, now part of Veisjärve
