= Järveküla, Viljandi County =

Village in Estonia

Järveküla
- Village
- Location in Estonia
- Coordinates: 58°10′37″N 25°58′14″E
- Country: Estonia
- County: Viljandi County
- Municipality: Viljandi Parish

Population (2011)
  - Total: 53

Järveküla is a village located in Viljandi Parish, Viljandi County, Estonia, located 9.4 km (5.8 miles) southeast of the small borough of Mustla, near the southwestern shore of Lake Võrtsjärv. Other neighboring villages include Unametsa, Suislepa and Soe. As of 2011, the population of Järveküla was 53, a decrease in population from 79 residents during the 2000 census.

Järveküla is home to the 267.9 ha (662 acres) Järveküla Nature Reserve, founded in 1990 to protect resident white-tailed eagles.
