= Aino Tamm =

Estonian vocalist (1864–1945)

Aino Tamm (23 December 1864 in Kuressaare, Tarvastu Parish – 7 December 1945 in Tallinn) was an Estonian singer and singing pedagog.

1886-1889 she studied singing in St. Petersburg at several private teachers. Her singing career started in 1891 in St. Petersburg and also in Estonia. In 1900 she introduced Estonian vocal music and folk music at the Paris Expo Porte de Versailles.

From 1923 until 1945, she taught singing at the Tallinn Conservatory. Students included: Tooni Kroon, Eino Uuli, Jenny Siimon, Meta Kodanipork, Aleksander Tamm.
