= Martin Lipp =

Estonian poet

Martin Lipp (14 April [O.S. 2 April] 1854 in Vooru, Viljandi Parish – 8 March 1923 in Nõo) was an Estonian poet. He is best known as the author of the poem The Estonian Flag, which was set to the music of the then young composer Enn Võrk. That song became as popular to the Estonian people as the Marseillaise was to the French in the times of the French Revolution and also played an important role during the time of the Estonian "Singing Revolution" in the late 1980s.

== Early life ==
He was the son of a tenant farmer. After attending the Tarvastu Parish School, he then went to Valga to attend the district school there..

== Pastoral activities ==
Lipp also served as the pastor of the St. Lawrence Church in Nõo, Estonia.
