= Ado Birk =

Estonian politician (1883–1942)

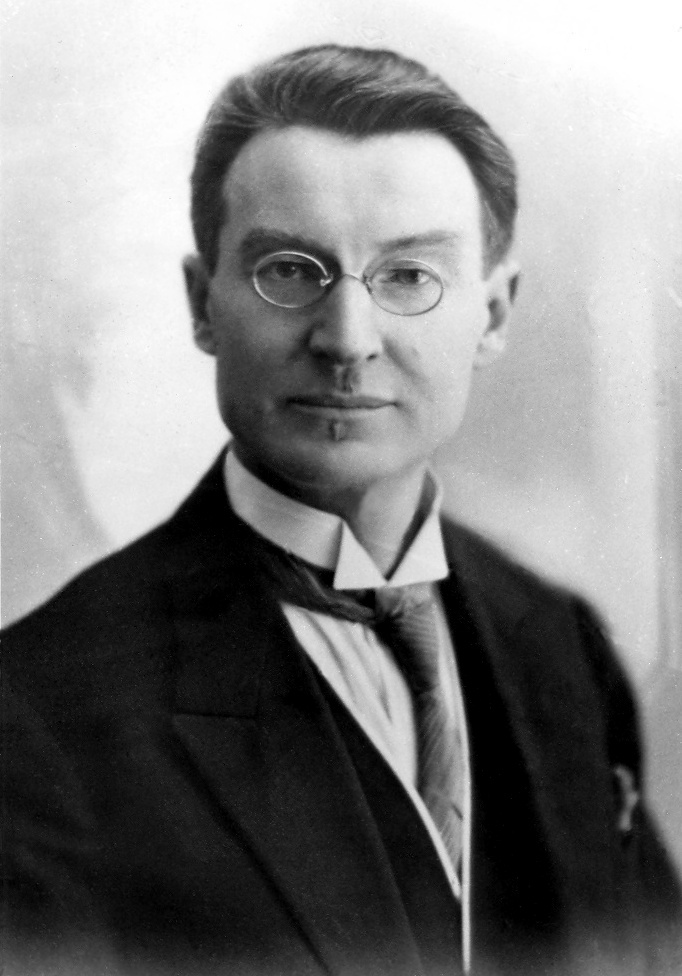

Prime Minister of Estonia
- In office 28 July 1920 – 30 July 1920
- Preceded by: Jaan Tõnisson
- Succeeded by: Jaan Tõnisson

Personal details
- Born: 14 November 1883 Mõnnaste, Tarvastu Parish, Governorate of Livonia, Russian Empire
- Died: 2 February 1942 (aged 58) Sosva, Sverdlovsk Oblast, Russian SFSR, USSR
- Party: People's Party; National Centre Party later none
- Education: Saint Petersburg Theological Academy; University of Tartu; Saint Petersburg State University; University of Leipzig
- Profession: lawyer

Ado Birk (also known as Aadu Birk, Aado Birk or Avdei Birk; 14 November [O.S. 2 November] 1883 – 2 February 1942), was an Estonian politician who was the Estonian Prime Minister for the shortest time.

== Early life and education ==
Ado Birk was born in Kulbisaare farmstead, Mõnnaste village, Tarvastu Parish, Kreis Fellin, Governorate of Livonia. He graduated from the Theological (Orthodox) Seminary in Riga, studied in the Saint Petersburg Theological Academy, and in the law departments of the Tartu (1907–1908), Saint Petersburg (1908–1911) and Leipzig (1911) universities.

== Career ==
Between 1911 and 1912 he was Head of the Tallinn Statistical Bureau. From 1912 to 1917 he worked as a solicitor to barrister Jaan Poska.

In 1917 he was made provisional secretary of the Estonian Province Assembly (Eesti Maanõukogu), and in 1918 was made representative of Estonia in Helsinki, Finland. From 1918 to 1919 he was Chairman of Estonian Province Assembly and chairman of General Committee of Elections to the Constituent Assembly (Asutav Kogu). From 1919 to 1920 he was vice chairman of Constituent Assembly and Minister of Foreign Affairs. He was prime minister for three days from 28 July 1920 to 30 July 1920. Between 1917 and 1924, Birk was also chairman of the Tallinn Voluntary Society of Firemen, in 1919–1922 chairman of the All-Estonian Union of Firemen. He was again appointed foreign minister in 1925 but on a caretaker capacity.

He served in the Estonian mission to Russia from 1922 to 1926. An account detailed how he was recruited by the Soviet's department of intelligence (KRO) acting under a false flag.

Birk became active in the Estonian Apostolic Orthodox Church (EAOC) from the second half of 1920s onward. In 1939–1940 he was the Ecumenical Secretary of the EAOC, and at the same time also an active entrepreneur in Tallinn.

During World War II, soon after the Soviet Union invaded and occupied Estonia in June 1940, Birk was arrested by the Stalinist terror regime and, similarly to most other senior Estonian politicians at the time, was either executed or died in Soviet captivity soon afterwards. He was arrested by the NKVD (People's Commissariat of Internal Affairs, the Soviet secret police) on 14 June 1941, and while in captivity, transported to Soviet Russia a few weeks later.

== Death ==
On 23 January 1942, Birk was sentenced to death, without trial, by the Soviet Special Council of the NKVD. According to remaining documents he died immediately before the planned execution, at the Sevurallag (a Soviet Gulag prison camp) in Sosva, Sverdlovsk oblast, then Soviet Russia.

Political offices
Preceded by Jaan Tõnisson	Prime Minister of Estonia; 28 July 1920 – 30 July 1920	Succeeded by Jaan Tõnisson
Preceded by Ants Piip	Minister of Foreign Affairs; 1919–1920	Succeeded by Kaarel Robert Pusta
Diplomatic posts
Preceded by Tõnis Vares	Envoy of Estonia to Soviet Union; 1922–1926	Succeeded by Heinrich Laretei
