= Kannuküla =

Village in Estonia

- Village
- Location in Estonia
- Coordinates: 58°08′16″N 25°47′40″E
- Country: Estonia
- County: Viljandi County
- Municipality: Viljandi Parish

Population (2011)
  - Total: 42

Kannuküla is a village in Viljandi Parish, Viljandi County, Estonia. Until the 2017 administrative reform of Estonian municipalities the village was located in Tarvastu Parish. Kannuküla is located 28 km (17) southeast of the town of Viljandi, 12 km (7.4 miles) southwest of the small borough of Mustla, near the border of Viljandi County and Valga County. Neighboring villages include Kärstna, Anikatsi and Ämmuste. The population of Kannuküla as of 2011 was 42, a decrease from 61 in the 2000 census.
