= Porga =

Porga may refer to:

- Porga, Benin, a town
- Põrga, a village in Estonia
- Porga of Croatia, a medieval ruler
