= Tagamõisa =

Tagamõisa may refer to several places in Estonia:

- Tagamõisa, Saare County, village in Estonia
- Tagamõisa, Viljandi County, village in Estonia
