= Maltsa =

Village in Estonia

Porsa
- Village
- Location in Estonia
- Coordinates: 58°08′22″N 25°59′35″E
- Country: Estonia
- County: Viljandi County
- Municipality: Viljandi Parish

Population (2011)
  - Total: 36

Maltsa is a village in Viljandi Parish, Viljandi County, Estonia. Until the 2017 administrative reform of Estonian municipalities the village was located in Tarvastu Parish. Maltsa is located 21 km (13 miles) southeast of the town of Viljandi, 13 km (8 miles) southeast of the small borough of Mustla, near the western shore of Lake Võrtsjärv. Neighboring villages include Suislepa, Järveküla and Kärstna. As of 2011, the population of Maltsa was 36, a decrease from 44 in the 2000 census.
