= Vilimeeste =

Village in Estonia

- Village
- Location in Estonia
- Coordinates: 58°14′36″N 25°45′33″E
- Country: Estonia
- County: Viljandi County
- Municipality: Viljandi Parish

Population (2011)
  - Total: 51

Vilimeeste is a village in Viljandi Parish, Viljandi County, Estonia. Until the 2017 administrative reform of Estonian municipalities the village was located in Tarvastu Parish. Vilimeeste is 17 km (10 miles) southeast of the town of Viljandi and 5.9 km (4 miles) northwest of the small borough of Mustla. Neighboring villages include Ämmuste and Holstre. As of 2011, the population on Vilimeeste was 51, a slight decrease from 53 in the 2000 census.
