= Vanausse =

Village in Estonia

- Village
- Location in Estonia
- Coordinates: 58°15′40″N 25°50′47″E
- Country: Estonia
- County: Viljandi County
- Municipality: Viljandi Parish
  - Density: 39/km^{2} (100/sq mi)

Vanausse is a village in Viljandi Parish, Viljandi County, Estonia. Until the 2017 administrative reform of Estonian municipalities the village was located in Tarvastu Parish. Vanausse is located 19 km (11.8 miles) southeast of the town of Viljandi, 3 km (1.8 miles) north of the small borough of Mustla, near the western shore of Lake Võrtsjärv. Neighboring villages include Ülensi, Villa and Tarvastu. Vanausse had a population of 39, a decrease from 71 in the 2000 census.
