= Unametsa =

Village in Estonia

- Village
- Location in Estonia
- Coordinates: 58°11′57″N 25°55′54″E
- Country: Estonia
- County: Viljandi County
- Municipality: Viljandi Parish

Population (2011)
  - Total: 56

Unametsa (locally, Unamõtsa) is a village in Viljandi Parish, Viljandi County, Estonia. Until the 2017 administrative reform of Estonian municipalities, the village was located in Tarvastu Parish. It is located 27 km (16.7 miles) southeast of the town of Viljandi and 5.8 km (3.6 miles) southeast of the small borough of Mustla, near the western shore of Lake Võrtsjärv. Neighboring villages include Suislepa and Soe. As of 2021, the population of Unametsa was 41, a decrease of a population of 76 in the 2000 census.
