= Porsa, Estonia =

Village in Estonia

Porsa
- Village
- Location in Estonia
- Coordinates: 58°14′41″N 25°52′33″E
- Country: Estonia
- County: Viljandi County
- Municipality: Viljandi Parish

Population (2011)
  - Total: 63

Porsa is a village in Viljandi Parish, Viljandi County, Estonia. Until the 2017 administrative reform of Estonian municipalities the village was located in Tarvastu Parish. Porsa is located 21 km (13 miles) southeast of the town of Viljandi, 1.4 km (0.9 miles) north of the small borough of Mustla, near the western shore of Lake Võrtsjärv. Other neighboring villages include Tarvastu, Ülensi and Villa. As of 2011, the population of Porsa was 63, a decrease in population from 73 in the 2000 census.
