= Mihkel Veske =

Estonian poet and linguist (1843–1890)

- Mihkel Veske
- A portrait of Veske
- Born: Mihkel Veske; 28 January 1843; Governorate of Livonia (Note: Veske was born in what would be today the Viljandi region in Estonia)
- Died: 16 May 1890 (aged 47); Kazan, Russian Empire
- Burial place: Kazan, Russian Empire
- Occupations: theologian, author, poet, nationalist and linguist
- Years active: 1872–1890
- Known for: first Estonian to hold a doctorate in linguistics, theories on Finno-Ugric languages (such as phonetic quantity theory)

Academic background
- Education: University of Leipzig
- Thesis: Untersuchungen zur vergleichenden Grammatik des finnischen Sprachstammes (Studies on the Comparative Grammar of Finno-Ugric Languages) (1872)
- Influences: Carl Robert Jakobson, Neogrammarian thought (Note: Veske studied at the University of Leipzig which originated the Neogrammarian hypothesis that language followed basic laws and this view of linguistics impacted his research on Finno-Ugric languages.)

Academic work
- Discipline: linguistics, Finno-Ugric studies
- Sub-discipline: Estonian language, dialectology
- School or tradition: German, Neogrammarian (Note: The Neogrammarian school of thought was started at the University of Leipzig.)
- Institutions: University of Tartu, University of Kazan
- Main interests: Finno-Ugric languages, Estonian dialects, folklore
- Notable works: "Kas tunned maad, mis Peipsi rannalt" (Do you know the land from the shores of Lake Peipsi) "Mingem üles mägedele"
- Notable ideas: a three-quantity phonetic system in Estonian
- Influenced: Paul Ariste

Mihkel Veske (28 January 1843 – 16 May 1890) was an Estonian theologian, author, poet, nationalist and linguist. He was the first Estonian to receive a doctorate in linguistics. He earned his degree in 1872 for his thesis on the comparative-historical grammar of Finno-Ugric languages at the University of Leipzig. Veske is considered one of the leaders of the Estonian National Awakening. Veske was involved in the leadership of the Estonian national movement, and promoted the ideas of fellow revolutionary, Carl Robert Jakobson. Veske was also a lecturer in Estonian at the University of Tartu. He was one of the first Estonian linguist to apply the comparative-historical method and theorised on phonetic quantity theory, later influencing the work of Paul Ariste. He worked as a teacher of Estonian at a Russian-language seminary in Tartu. He was also a writer. Veske published the poetry collection "Songs with Melodies" (Laulud Viisidega, 1874), a choral song collection "Song Collection..." (Laulukogu..., 1880). His most well-known works are the folk songs "Do you know the land..." ("Kas tunned maad, mis Peipsi rannalt") and "Let's Go Up the Mountains" ("Mingem üles mägedele").

== Early life ==
Veske was born on 28 January 1843 on the Veske farm in the village of Vilimeeste, Holstre Parish, (Note: Some sources list Veske farm as being in Paistu parish in Viljandi County, while others list Holstre.) in northern Livonia in the Russian Empire. (Note: Now in modern day Metsla village, Viljandi Parish, Viljandi County.) He came from a farming family.

He attended the village school in Pullerits, the parish school in Paistu. He completed his secondary school in Tartu at Tartu Gymnasium and was a non-credit student there. He expressed an early interest in becoming a missionary. For this reason, after completing his secondary school, he traveled to Germany for further study. In 1866, with the support of the Paistu Mary's (Paistu Maarja) parish pastor, Woldemar Adolf Hansen, he left for Leipzig.

Mihkel Veske in 1867

Between 1866 and 1867, he attended the Leipzig Mission School, however he did not graduate, instead deciding drop his seminary studies for academia.He studied under the faculty of Philosophy at the University of Leipzig, and at first took up Indo-European Studies.Around this time, Veske began writing for the newspapers Neue Dörptsche Zeitung and Eesti Põllumees.

He continued on to his doctoral studies at the University of Leipzig, this time in the field of comparative linguistics. In 1872, he graduated from the University of Leipzig with a doctoral degree in linguistics becoming the first Estonian to gain a doctorate in linguistics. He defended his doctoral dissertation on the topic of comparative grammar between languages. (Note: It was titled Untersuchungen zur vergleichenden Grammatik des finnischen Sprachstammes (Studies on the Comparative Grammar of Finno-Ugric Languages). He published his doctorate in 1873.)

== Career ==
From 1874 to 1887, Veske was a lecturer in Estonian at the Imperial University of Dorpat (now the University of Tartu) and attempted to establish a dedicated chair of Estonian language there. From 1878, he also worked as a teacher of Estonian at a Russian-language seminary in Tartu. It has been speculated that Veske might have become the first full professor of Estonian at the University of Tartu. However, during the Russification period, his strong national identity likely proved detrimental to that ambition. Consequently, he continued his research at the University of Kazan.

=== Data collection ===
In the following years, Veske undertook a series of research trips. Between 1875 and 1884, he spent his summers abroad, conducting linguistic research and comparing the dialects in different regions. He stayed in Finland in 1880 which lead to him creating a two volume Finnish language textbook published between 1881 and 1883, titled Teaching Finnish I-II. Between 1885 to 1886 he went to Hungary and learned Hungarian fluently enough to translate Sándor Petőfi's poems into Estonian, and was the first to do so.

In 1879, he published Eesti keele healte õpetus ja kirõtuse wiis, in which he recommended basing the written language on the adopting a phonetic spelling and basing the written language on the central North Estonian dialect, since at this time the language was not yet standardised. He published this in his 1879 work Eesti keele healte õpetus ja kirjutuse viis which contained his phonetic quantity theory that was later further developed by Paul Ariste.

He belonged to a number of nationalist groups advocating for independence within Estonia. During the 1880s, Veske was a public representative of the Estonian national awakening, serving as president of the Estonian Literary Society from 1882 to 1886. He worked with Estonian intellectuals and journalists involved in the Estonian national movement, such as Estonian nationalist Carl Robert Jakobson. In 1884, Veske founded and edited the magazine Oma Maa ("My Land").

=== Life in Kazan ===
From 1886 until his death in 1890, Veske was a lecturer in Finno-Ugric languages at the University of Kazan. He was assisted in securing a position in Kazan by Jan Baudouin de Courtenay, one of the founders of the Kazan school of linguistics, who was working at the University of Tartu at the time. Veske was officially appointed as a lecturer at Kazan University on 8 February 1886. In February 1886, Veske arrived in Saint Petersburg from Hungary. Then in April, he traveled to Moscow, where he tried to master the Russian language using an alphabet guide. On 3 September 1887, he delivered his first lecture at Kazan University on the topic "The Importance and Progress of Finno-Ugric Languages". However, because his command of Russian was not very comprehensible at that stage, his regular attendance consisted of only one student, N. Titov.

Despite difficult living conditions and financial pressures, Veske's time studied the languages of the Mari and Mordvin, and studied the cultural relations between the Finno-Ugric and Slavic peoples. While working in Kazan, Veske took two expeditions to research with Finno-Ugric peoples and collected nearly 200 Cheremis and Mordvin songs from the Mari and Mordvin people respectively. In 1889, Veske published on the dialects within the Mari language, titled "Studies on the dialects of the Mari language (Исследования о наречиях черемисского языка). In 1890, Veske also published a major study on cultural relations between Baltic Finns and Slavic peoples titled "Slavic-Finnic Cultural Relations According to Linguistic Data" (Славяно-финские культурные отношения по данным языка). In the book, he argued, using hydronyms, that Northern Russia was historically inhabited by Finno-Ugric peoples, a topic which has been discussed and theorised by other linguists. Veske used the shared loanwords between Slavic and Finno-Ugric languages as his supporting evidence.

On 16 June 1889, he was recognised for his academic work and was awarded the rank of State Counselor.

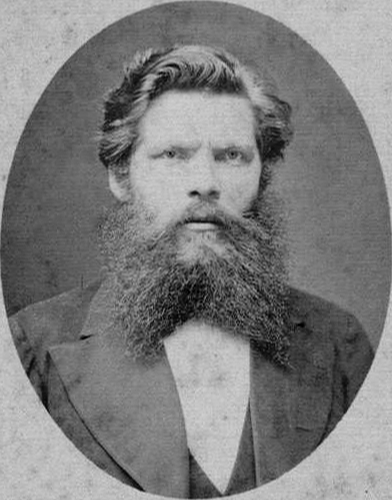
Mihkel Veske, date unknown.

== Writing ==
In addition to his academic career, Veske was an author and published poetry, translation, as well as made recordings of folk songs. He was influenced by Estonian tradition and his writing was primarily patriotic in nature. He often made frequent references to rural life in his writing. He wrote in a number of poetry collections, however only a few were published while he was still alive.

As a figure in the Estonian national movement, and likely because of the use of Estonian folklore and folksongs in his work, his work is also seen as patriotic in nature.Much of Veske's poetry draws inspiration from the simplicity of Estonian folk songs. He modelled some of his verse after traditional runic song verses (called regivärs). His writing style has been characterised as optimistic. His poems "Do you know the land..." ("Kas tunned maad, mis Peipsi rannalt") and "Let's Go Up the Mountains" ("Mingem üles mägedele"), became popular folk songs.

He actively collected folk poetry and translated numerous German, Russian, Finnish, and Hungarian pieces of folklore and folksong into Estonian. He also wrote several studies on folklore. Veske also published his collected folklore in the anthology Estonian Folk Songs I–II between 1879 and 1883.

Veske published the collection of poems, "Songs with Melodies" (Laulud Viisidega) in 1874. He also published a choral song publication with Peter Abel titled "Song Collection..." (Laulukogu...) in 1880. The book contained thirteen songs written by Veske. His posthumously published collections included Dr. Veske Laulud (1899), Mihkel Veske Laulud (1931), Valitud laulud (1949), and Ka tunned maad ... (1996).

== Death and legacy ==
The monument to Veske at Uus-Jaani cemetery

He died in Kazan on 16 May 1890 due to a heart attack.

Veske was initially buried in Kazan, but following a formal petition by Karl August Hermann, his remains were transferred to Tartu. Veske's body was reburied in the Uus-Jaani cemetery in Tartu on 21 October 1890, accompanied by a funeral procession which was attended by thousands of people. An account from an attendee at the funeral noted that others there commented, "Die gehört ja schon selbst zu vanavara" which translates as "He belongs fully to folklore)". It has been speculated that because of the mixture of German in the phrase, the compliment also alluded to the high level of education that Veske had attained.

A memorial was unveiled at his grave at the Uus-Jaani cemetery in 1899. The granite base of the memorial featured a bust of Veske created by August Weizenberg. The bust was lost after it was removed from the gravesite after World War II, but the grave itself and the granite base of the monument are heritage-protected. Today, a copy of Weizenberg's original bust stands at the gravesite.

Alongside Jakob Hurt and Karl August Hermann, Veske was one of the first scientifically trained Estonian linguists. Veske was also one of the first Estonian linguists to use a comparative method of historical linguistics. He is known for advocating for an Estonian standard language on the basis of the North Estonian dialect and phonetic spelling.

He pointed out the causes of the emergence of the third quantity lengths in the Estonian language.Veske was the first person to put forward the theory that the Estonian language has three phonetic lengths: over-long, long, and short.He contributed to the study of the northern and northeastern Estonian dialects.
