= Riuma =

Village in Estonia

- Village
- Location in Estonia
- Coordinates: 58°20′06″N 25°53′19″E
- Country: Estonia
- County: Viljandi County
- Municipality: Viljandi Parish

Population (2011)
  - Total: 38

Riuma is a village in Viljandi Parish, Viljandi County, Estonia. Until the 2017 administrative reform of Estonian municipalities the village was located in Tarvastu Parish. Riuma is approximately 1000 meters from the western shore of the lake Võrtsjärv, 17 km (10 miles) southeast of the town of Viljandi. In 2011 Riuma had a population of 38, a decline of 20 individuals from when a census was taken in 2000 and the population was 58. It is a popular destination for tourists.
