= Tinnikuru =

Village in Estonia

- Village
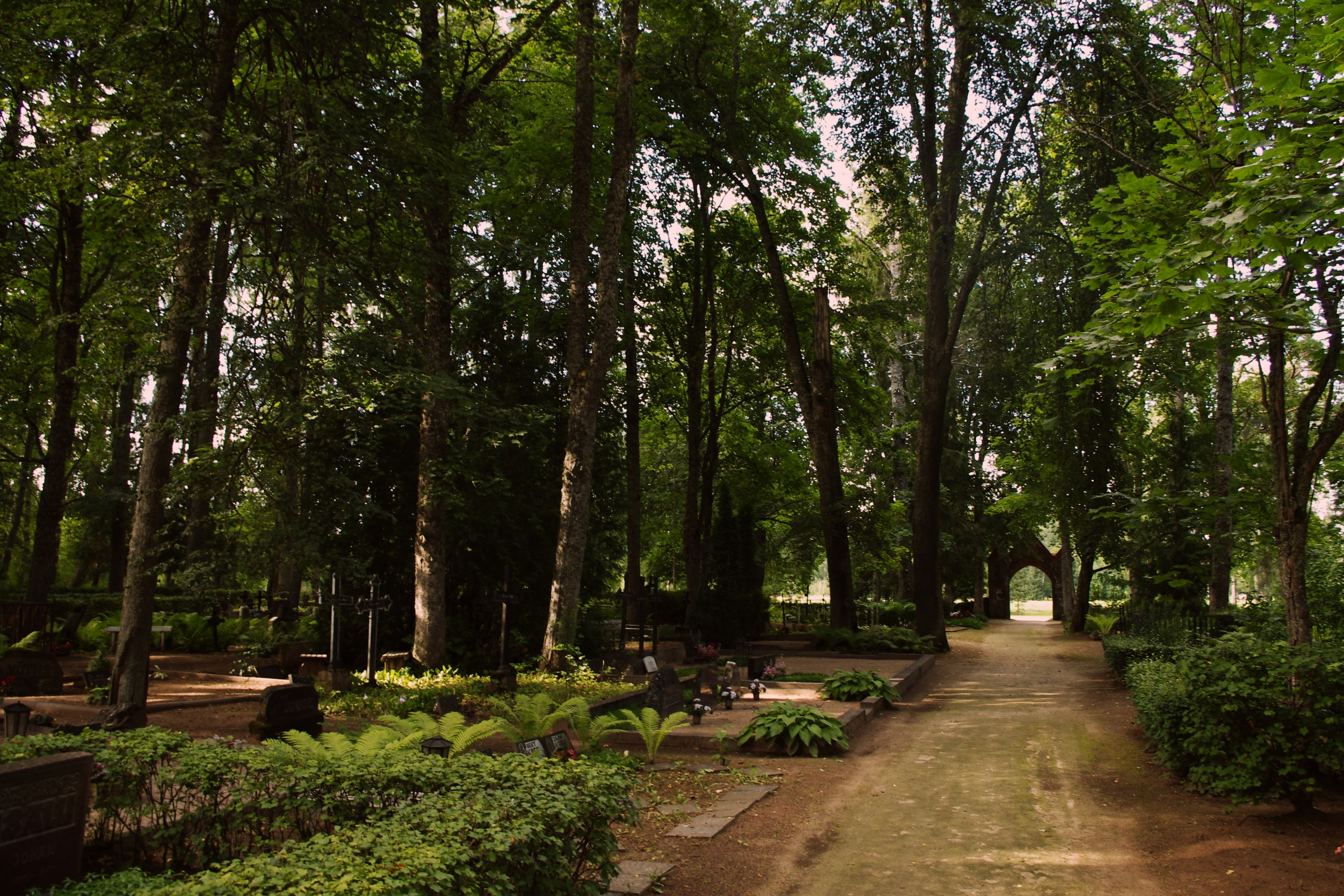
- Tarvastu cemetery in Tinnikuru village.

- Location in Estonia
- Coordinates: 58°12′17″N 25°46′52″E
- Country: Estonia
- County: Viljandi County
- Municipality: Viljandi Parish

Population (2011 Census)
  - Total: 89

Tinnikuru is a village in Viljandi Parish, Viljandi County, Estonia. Until the 2017 administrative reform of Estonian municipalities the village was located in Tarvastu Parish. As of the 2011 Estonia Census, the settlement's population was 89.

Tarvastu cemetery is located in Tinnikuru village.
