= Hendrik Adamson =

Estonian poet and teacher

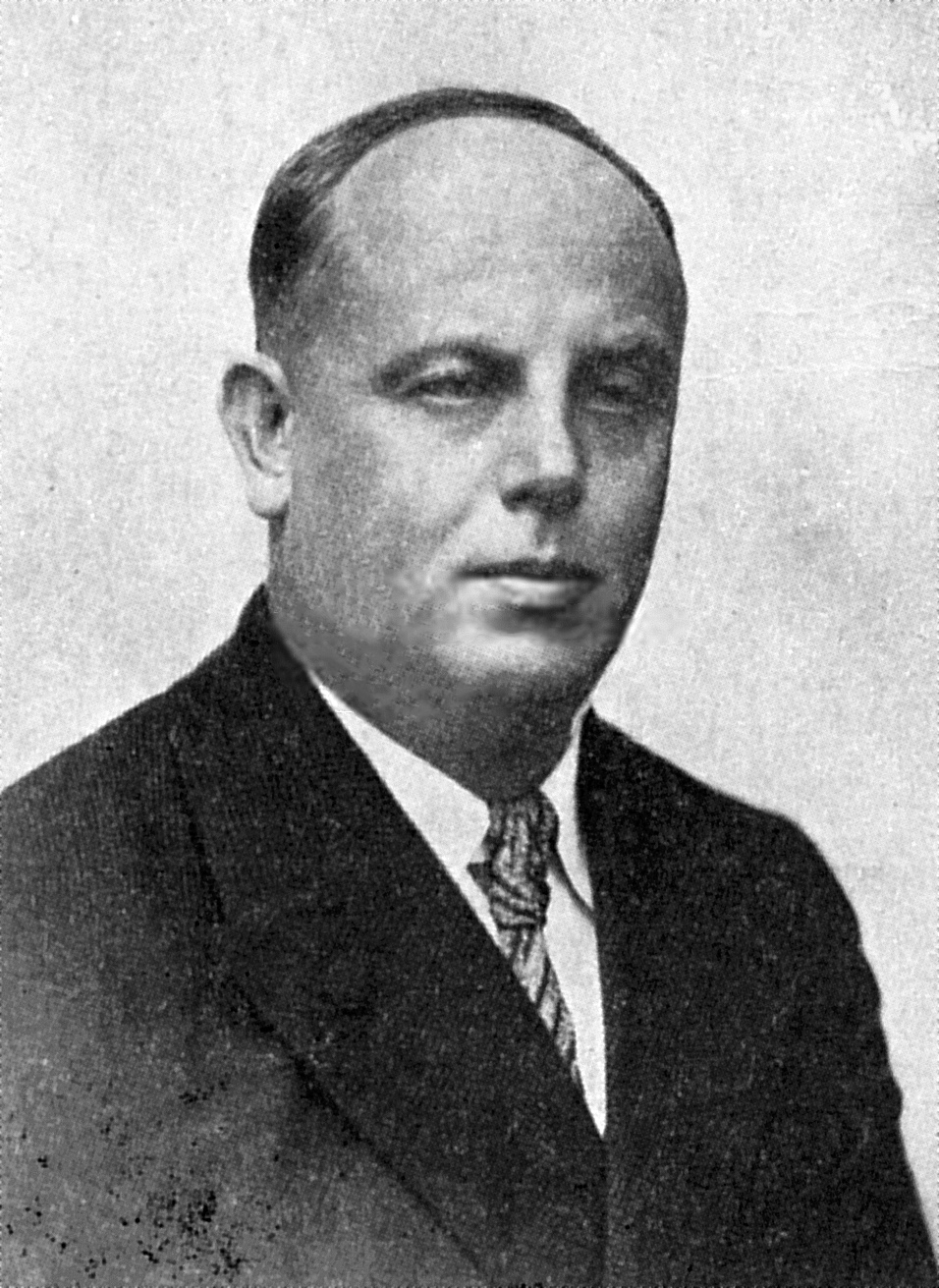
- Estonian poet and teacher
- Born: September 24, 1891; Kärstna, Estonia
- Died: March 7, 1946 (aged 54); Tuhalaane, then part of Estonian SSR, Soviet Union
- Occupations: Writer, poet
- Writing career
- Period: 20th century

Hendrik Adamson (6 October [O.S. 24 September] 1891 – 7 March 1946) was an Estonian poet and teacher.

He was born as a son of a tailor in Patsi farmstead in the village of Metsakuru, Kärstna Parish (now in the village of Veisjärve, Viljandi Parish), Viljandi County. He started working as a teacher at the Torma Võtikvere Ministry of Education in 1911. During this time, he published several short stories (in prose) and poems in newspapers. This works attracted the attention of Friedebert Tuglas, a literary critic.

From 1919 to 1927 he was the head of the primary school in Kärstna. Subsequently, he became a professional writer and a member of the Estonian Writers' Union.

Adamson also wrote in Esperanto. All of his Estonian works have been translated into Esperanto.

Notable poems include "Mulgimaa" (Tartu, 1919), "Inimen" (Tartu, 1925), "Tõus ja mõõn" (Tartu, 1931), "Kolletuspäev" (Tartu, 1934), "Mälestuste maja" (Tartu, 1936) and "Linnulaul" (Tartu, 1937). He also published the novels "Kuldblond neitsi" and "Roheline sisalik" (Tartu, 1925).
