= Jaan Port =

Estonian botanist

Jaan Port (9 February 1891 in Raassilla, Holstre Parish (now, Viljandi Parish) – 24 January 1950 in Tartu) was an Estonian botanist.

He graduated from the University of Tartu in 1926. From 1927 to 1929 Port complemented his gardening knowledge in Germany. Between 1930 and 1937 he worked as the prime gardener in the Botanical Garden of the University of Tartu. In 1932 he received the PhD in botany. Later 1937–1940 Port served as the director of Tartu Teachers' Seminar.

Notable publications include Iluaiad ja kodu ümbruse kaunistus (1933), Aianduse õpperaamat (1940) and Ehisaiandus (1949)

Jaan Port's son was notable architect Mart Port and grandson is sports biologist Kristjan Port..

Jaan port is buried at the Tartu Maarja cemetery (part of Raadi cemetery).
