= Väluste =

Village in Estonia

- Village
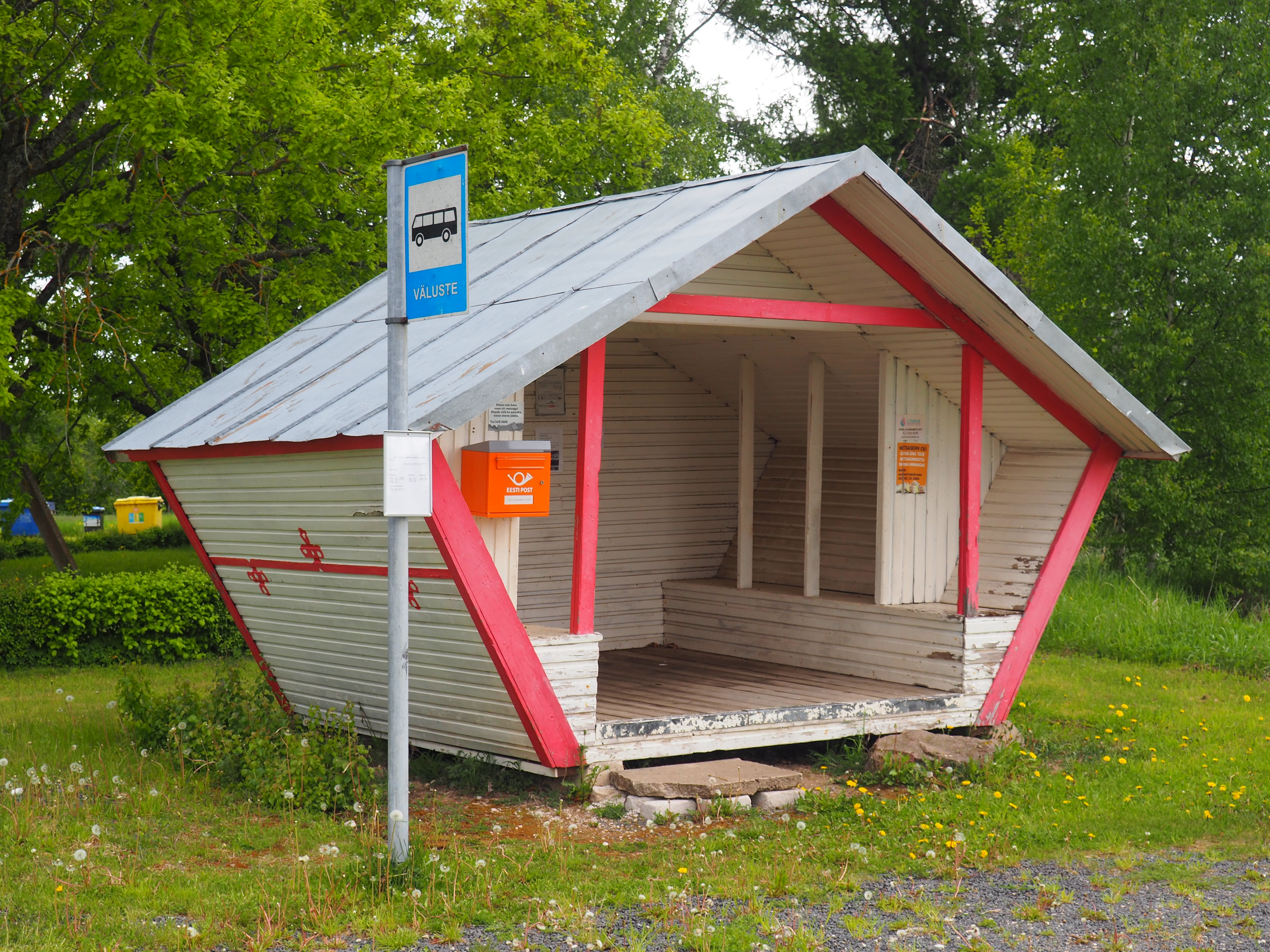
- Väluste bus stop

- Location in Estonia
- Coordinates: 58°18′01″N 25°52′52″E
- Country: Estonia
- County: Viljandi County
- Municipality: Viljandi Parish

Population (2011)
  - Total: 70

Väluste is a village in Viljandi Parish, Viljandi County, Estonia, on the western shore of Lake Võrtsjärv, Estonia's largest inland lake. The village lies 8.1 km (4.9 miles) south of the small borough of Mustla and 18 km (11 miles) southeast of the town of Viljandi. As of 2011, Väluste had a population of 70 residents, a decrease from 102 in the 2000 census.

== History ==
Väluste lies within the historical Mulgimaa cultural region of southern Estonia, an area distinguished by the Mulgi dialect and a 19th-century history of prosperous flax-growing farms. Until the 2017 administrative reform of Estonian municipalities, the village was located in Tarvastu Parish, one of the five historical parishes of Mulgimaa and a part of the medieval Sakala region. In the autumn of 2017 Tarvastu Parish was merged with Kolga-Jaani Parish into the enlarged Viljandi Parish.

== Landmarks ==
The Väluste rändrahn ("erratic boulder") is a granite glacial erratic lying roughly 300 m (984 ft) from the shore of Lake Võrtsjärv near the Riuma ditch. The boulder measures about 5.2 m long, 4.7 m wide and 2.4 m high, with a circumference of 16 m. Together with the surrounding 0.77 ha (1.9 acres) of land, it was designated a Protected Nature Monument under the Estonian Nature Conservation Act in 2007 and is also listed by the International Union for Conservation of Nature.

The Väluste shooting range, operated by the Sakala Malev of the Estonian Defence League, opened in October 2013 as the Defence League's first fully modern outdoor shooting range meeting contemporary standards. It has 24 firing positions and supports 11 firing distances ranging from 5 to 300 metres, with a 12-lane electronic target system in addition to conventional targets. The range was built on the site of a former Soviet military training area that the Defence League had used for exercises since the mid-1990s; construction, undertaken by Skanska, cost approximately €850,000. In addition to Sakala Malev volunteers, the facility is used by police and border guard personnel, hunters and members of the Estonian Defence Forces.
