= Johannes Semper =

Estonian writer and politician (1892–1970)

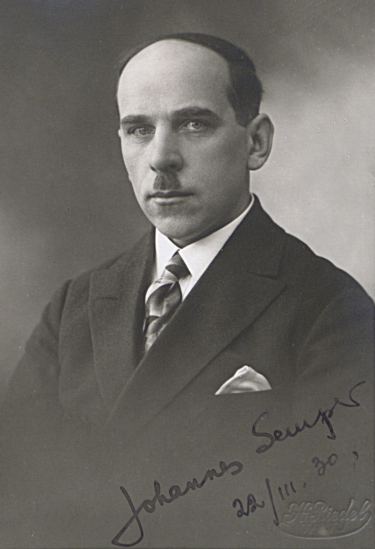
Johannes Semper, 1930s

Johannes Semper (22 March [O.S. 10 March] 1892 – 21 February 1970) was an Estonian poet, writer, translator and politician.

He was born in Pahuvere (now Viljandi Parish), Kreis Fellin, in the Governorate of Livonia. A student and later a prominent scholar at the University of Tartu, he was briefly nominated as Minister for Education of Estonia when the country was occupied by the Soviet Union in 1940.

He wrote the lyrics of the Anthem of the Estonian SSR.

He died in Tallinn and was buried at the Metsakalmistu.
