= Õhne =

River in Estonia

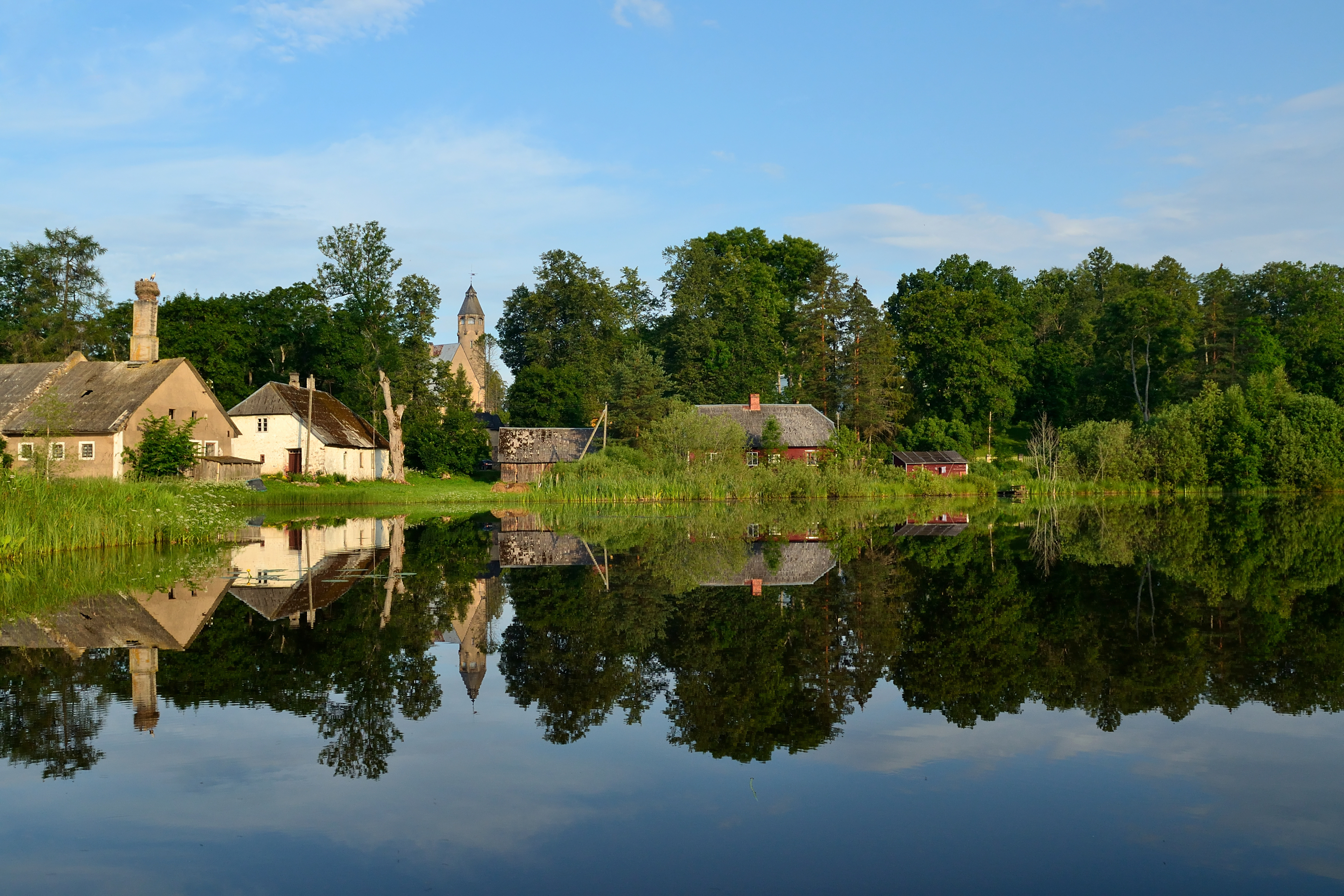

Location
- Countries: Estonia; Latvia

Physical characteristics
- Source: Veisjärv
  - coordinates: 58°4′57.99″N 25°45′41.19″E
  - elevation: 62 m (203 ft)
- Mouth: Lake Võrts
  - coordinates: 58°11′37.45″N 26°1′11.62″E
- Length: 94 km (58 mi)
- Basin size: 573 km^{2} (221 sq mi)

Basin features
- Progression: Lake Võrts→ Emajõgi→ Lake Peipus→ Narva→ Gulf of Finland

The Õhne (also known as the Suislepa and the Hoomuli River; Latvian: Omuļupe) is a 94 km (58 mi) long river in southern Estonia. Its source is Veisjärv, a lake in Viljandi County, and it empties into Lake Võrts. It also flows for a few kilometres in Latvia, where it is known as the Omuļupe or Ehne. The basin area of the Õhne is 573 km^{2}. The populated places of Tõrva, Vooru, and Suislepa are located on the Õhne River.

== Gallery ==
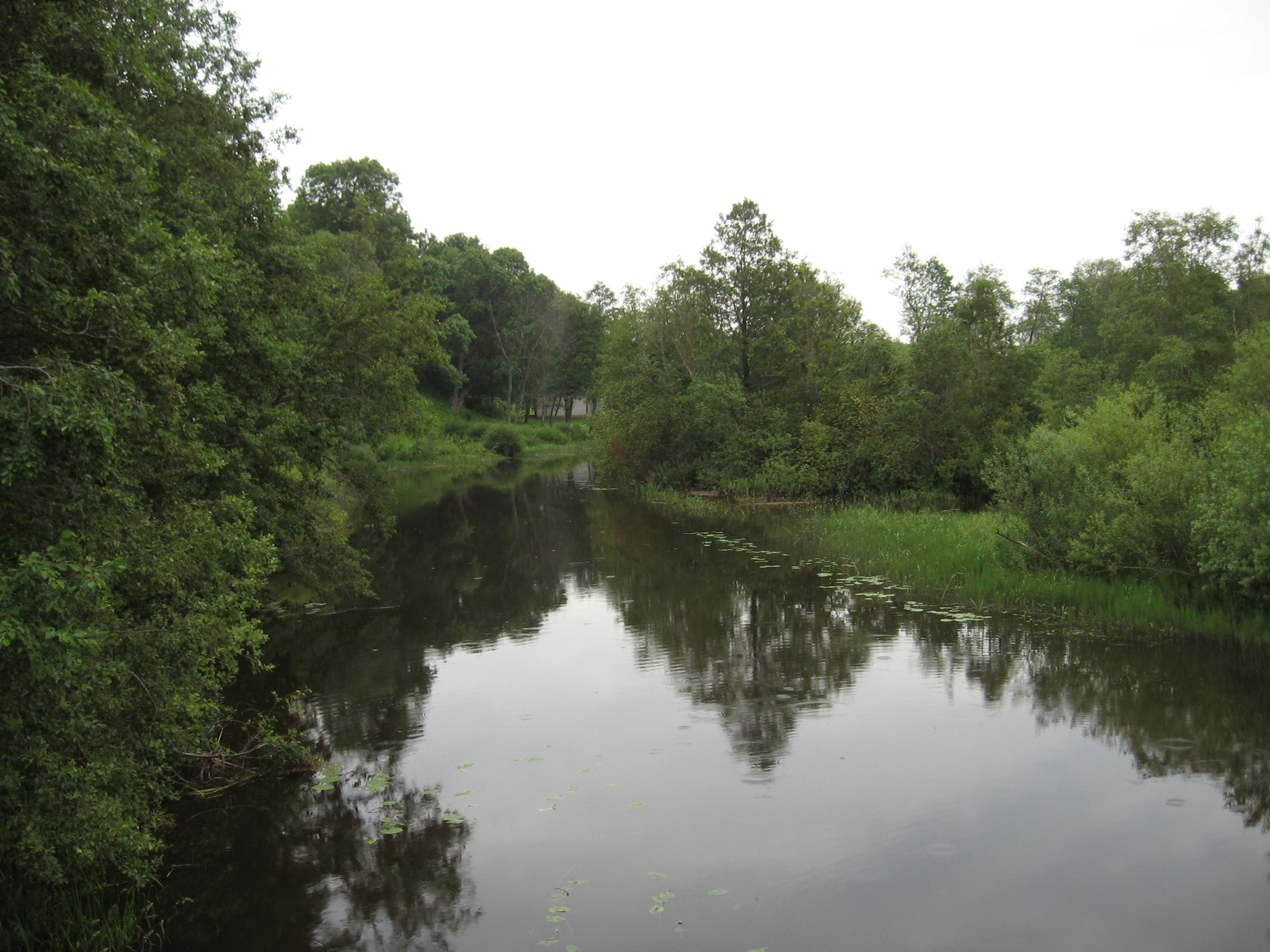

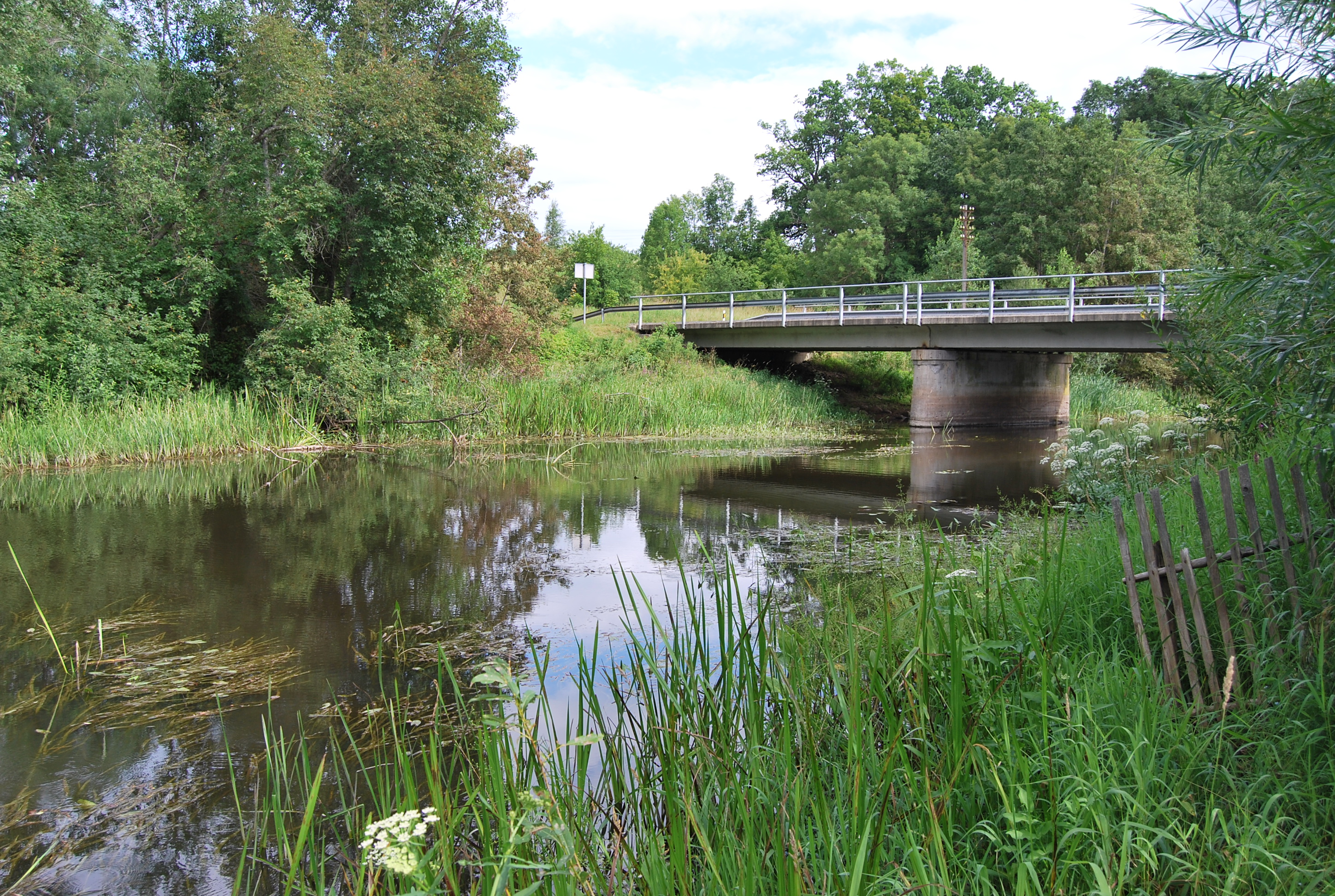

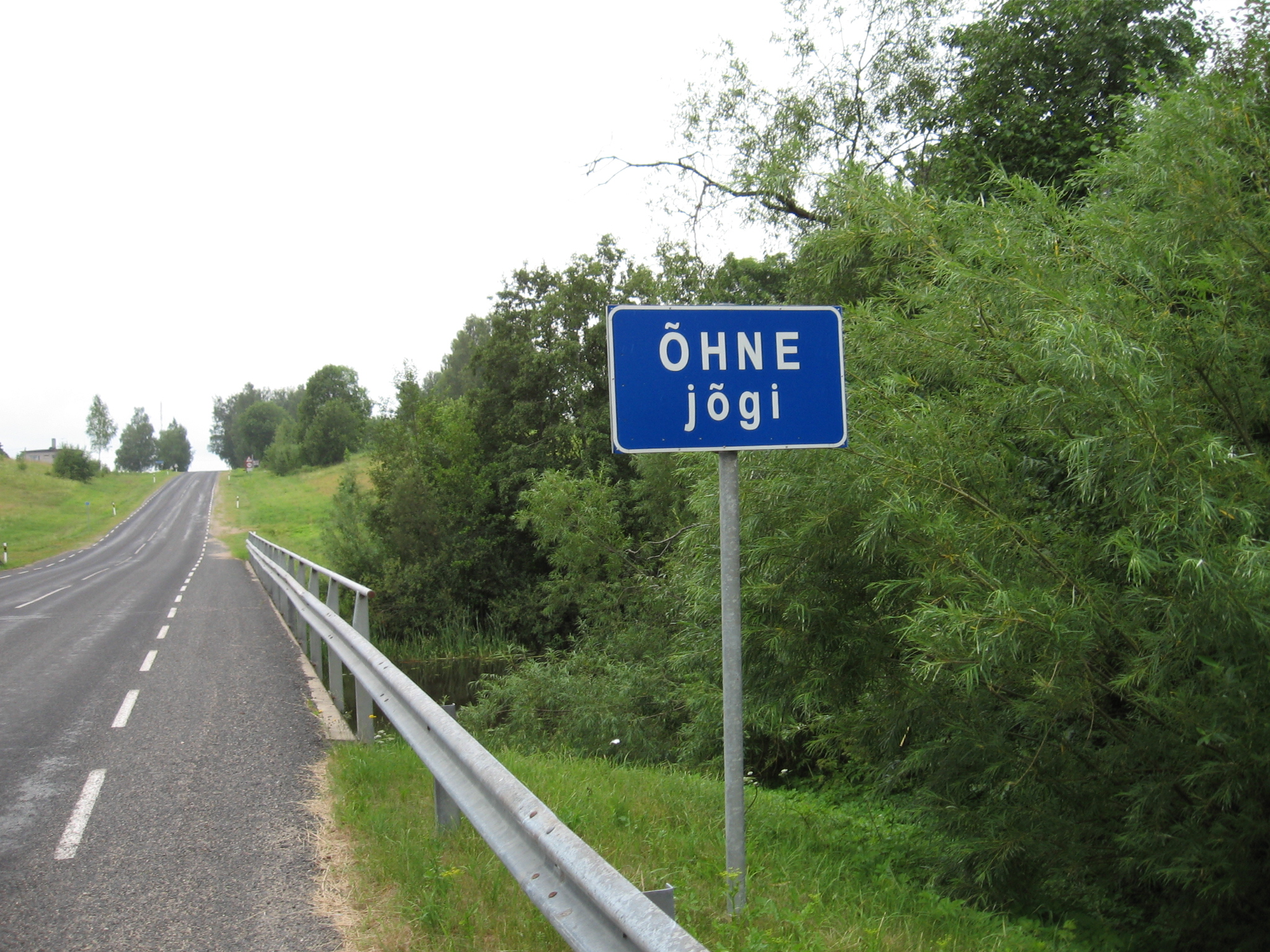

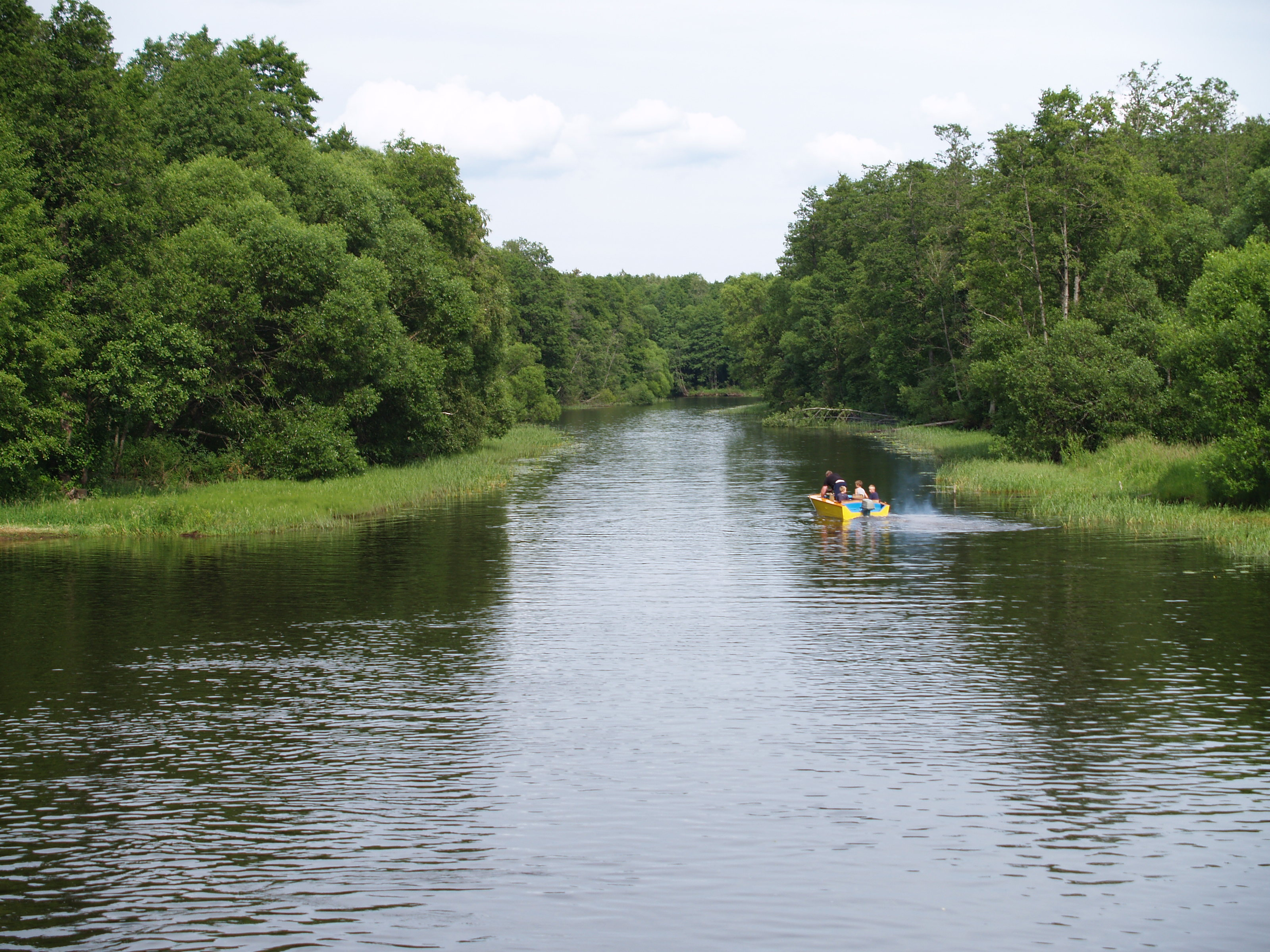
