= Pahuvere =

Village in Estonia

- Village
- Location in Estonia
- Coordinates: 58°11′05″N 25°41′59″E
- Country: Estonia
- County: Viljandi County
- Municipality: Viljandi Parish

Population (2011)
  - Total: 88

Pahuvere is a village in Viljandi Parish, Viljandi County, Estonia. Until the 2017 administrative reform of Estonian municipalities the village was located in Tarvastu Parish. Pahuvere located 25 km (15 miles) south of the town of Viljandi. The population as of 2011 was 88 individuals.

Pahuvere was first mentioned in German chronicles in 1429 and was called Willust by Baltic German settlers. The village is the site of Pahuvere manor, built by Baltic German nobility. Pahuvere is the birthplace of Estonian poet, prose writer, critic, translator, essayist and politician Johannes Semper (1892–1970).
