= Raassilla =

Village in Estonia

- Village
- Location in Estonia
- Coordinates: 58°14′40″N 25°44′12″E
- Country: Estonia
- County: Viljandi County
- Municipality: Viljandi Parish

Population (2011)
  - Total: 32

Raassilla is a village in Viljandi Parish, Viljandi County, Estonia. Between 1991 and 2017 (until the administrative reform of Estonian municipalities) the village was located in Tarvastu Parish.

Raassilla is home to the Raassilla Speedway, which holds motocross events. It is also the birthplace of Estonian botanist Jaan Port (1891–1950).
