= Mõnnaste =

Village in Estonia

- Village
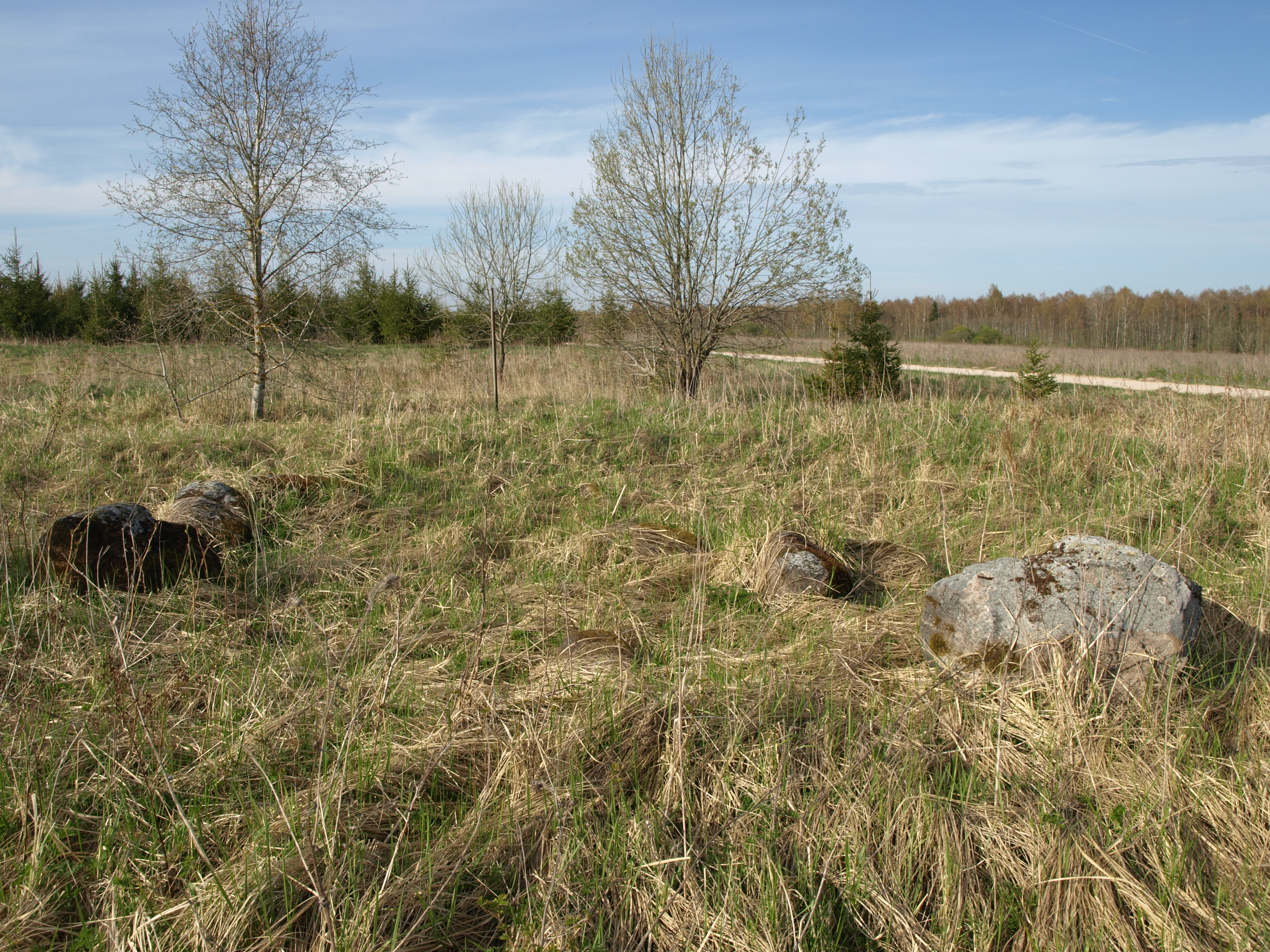

- Location in Estonia
- Coordinates: 58°17′51″N 25°49′20″E
- Country: Estonia
- County: Viljandi County
- Municipality: Viljandi Parish

Population (2011)
  - Total: 69

Mõnnaste is a village in Viljandi Parish, Viljandi County, Estonia. Until the 2017 administrative reform of Estonian municipalities the village was located in Tarvastu Parish. Mõnnaste is 15 km (9 miles) southeast of the town of Viljandi near the western shore of the lake Võrtsjärv. The population of Mõnnaste was 69 people as of 2011.

Mõnnaste is the birthplace of Estonian politician and former Prime Minister of Estonia, Ado Birk (1883-1942) and Estonian poet Eha Lättemäe (1922-2012).
