= Järveküla Nature Reserve =

Protected area in Estonia

- Location within Estonia
- Location: Estonia
- Coordinates: 58°10′26″N 26°01′09″E
- Area: 267.9 ha (662 acres)
- Established: 1990

Järveküla Nature Reserve is a nature reserve founded in 1990, situated by Lake Vörtsjärv in southern Estonia (Viljandi County) near the village of Järveküla. The nature reserve has been established to protect the population of white-tailed eagles present in the area, and includes pine forest and patches of bog.

Other birds found in Järveküla Nature Reserve include: the Barn swallow (the national bird of Estonia), Eurasian wryneck, Eurasian golden oriole, Icterine warbler, River warbler, Spotted flycatcher, Eurasian tree sparrow, Common chaffinch, European greenfinch, European pied flycatcher, Eurasian skylark, Fieldfare, White wagtail, Yellowhammer, Hooded crow, Garden warbler, Grey heron, Eurasian blue tit, Eurasian blackcap, Common rosefinch, European goldfinch and Common chiffchaff among others.
