= Suislepa Airfield =

Airfield in Estonia

Suislepa Airfield Suislepa lennuväli
- IATA: none; ICAO: none

Summary
- Airport type: ~~Military~~
- Operator: ~~Soviet Air Force~~
- Location: Tõrva
- Elevation AMSL: 203 ft / 62 m
- Coordinates: 58°11′24″N 025°56′54″E

Map
- Location in Estonia

Runways
Direction	Length		Surface
Direction	m	ft	Surface
~~18/36~~	~~3,000~~	~~9,842~~	~~Grass~~
- Sources: Forgotten Airfields

Suislepa Airfield (also given as Tõrva, Torva and Torva North) is a former air base in Estonia located in the village of Suislepa, 15 km (9.3 mi) north of Tõrva. It was possibly an abandoned front-line or maritime bomber base that was mainly used in the 1960s. Some remains of runways and taxiways can be seen on Google Earth satellite imagery.
