= Veisjärv =

Lake in Estonia

- Location within Estonia
- Location: Viljandi County
- Coordinates: 58°06′N 25°45′E
- Primary inflows: Õhne River
- Basin countries: Estonia
- Max. length: 3,410 meters (11,190 ft)
- Surface area: 480.6 hectares (1,188 acres)
- Average depth: 1.2 meters (3 ft 11 in)
- Max. depth: 4.5 meters (15 ft)
- Water volume: 5,789,000 cubic meters (204,400,000 cu ft)
- Shore length^{1}: 9,540 meters (31,300 ft)
- Surface elevation: 96.3 meters (316 ft)
- Islands: 1
- ^{1} Shore length is not a well-defined measure.

Veisjärv (also known as Veisejärv) is a lake in Estonia. It is located in the village of Veisjärve in Viljandi Parish, Viljandi County, on the border of Mulgi Parish. The Õhne River flows into Veisjärv.

== Physical description ==
The lake has an area of 480.6 hectares (1,188 acres), and it has one island with an area of 0.2 hectares (0.49 acres). The lake has an average depth of 1.2 meters (3 ft 11 in) and a maximum depth of 4.5 meters (15 ft). It is 3,410 meters (11,190 ft) long, and its shoreline measures 9,540 meters (31,300 ft). It has a volume of 5,789,000 cubic meters (204,400,000 cu ft).

== See also ==
- List of lakes of Estonia
