= Villa, Viljandi County =

Village in Estonia

Villa
- Village
- Location in Estonia
- Coordinates: 58°15′47″N 25°53′09″E
- Country: Estonia
- County: Viljandi County
- Municipality: Viljandi Parish

Population (2011)
  - Total: 148

Villa is a village in Viljandi Parish, Viljandi County, Estonia. Until the 2017 administrative reform of Estonian municipalities the village was located in Tarvastu Parish. It is located 20 km (12 miles) southeast of the town of Viljandi and 3.8 km (2 miles) north of the small borough of Mustla, near the western shore of Lake Võrtsjärv. Neighboring villages include Holstre and Tarvastu. The population of Villa as of 2011 was 148, a decrease from 161 during the 2000 census.
