= Põrga =

Village in Estonia

- Village
- Location in Estonia
- Coordinates: 58°08′44″N 25°34′40″E
- Country: Estonia
- County: Viljandi County
- Municipality: Viljandi Parish

Population (2011)
  - Total: 52

Põrga is a village in Viljandi Parish, Viljandi County, Estonia. Until the 2017 administrative reform of Estonian municipalities the village was located in Tarvastu Parish. It is located 2.7 km (1 mile) directly south of the town of Kärstna, 30 km (18 miles) southeast of the town of Viljandi and 2 km (1 mile) north of the border of Viljandi County and Valga County. As of 2011, Põrga had a population of 52 residents, a decrease from 67 in the 2000 census.
