= Jakobimõisa =

Village in Estonia

- Village
- Location in Estonia
- Coordinates: 58°12′28″N 25°53′11″E
- Country: Estonia
- County: Viljandi County
- Municipality: Viljandi Parish

Population (2011)
  - Total: 58

Jakobimõisa is a village in Viljandi Parish, Viljandi County, Estonia. Until the 2017 administrative reform of Estonian municipalities the village was located in Tarvastu Parish. Jakobimõisa is located 24 km (15 miles) southeast of the town of Viljandi, near the western shore of the lake Võrtsjärv.

Jakobimõisa had a population of 58 in 2011, a decrease from 85 in the 2000 census.
