= Tarvastu =

Village in Estonia

- Village
- Location in Estonia
- Coordinates: 58°13′50″N 25°53′35″E
- Country: Estonia
- County: Viljandi County
- Municipality: Viljandi Parish

Population (2006)
  - Total: 99

Tarvastu (German: Tarwast) is a village in Viljandi Parish, Viljandi County, Estonia. It is located approximately 1 kilometer (0.62 mi) east of Mustla. Tarvastu has a population of 99 (as of 2006). The Tarvastu River flows northwest of the village, and Highway 52 from Viljandi to Rõngu passes to the southwest. Estonia's second-largest lake, Võrtsjärv, shares a short border with the village's territory.

Tarvastu is the birthplace of the Estonian wrestler Martin Klein (1884–1947), who won a silver medal at the 1912 Summer Olympics.

== Gallery ==
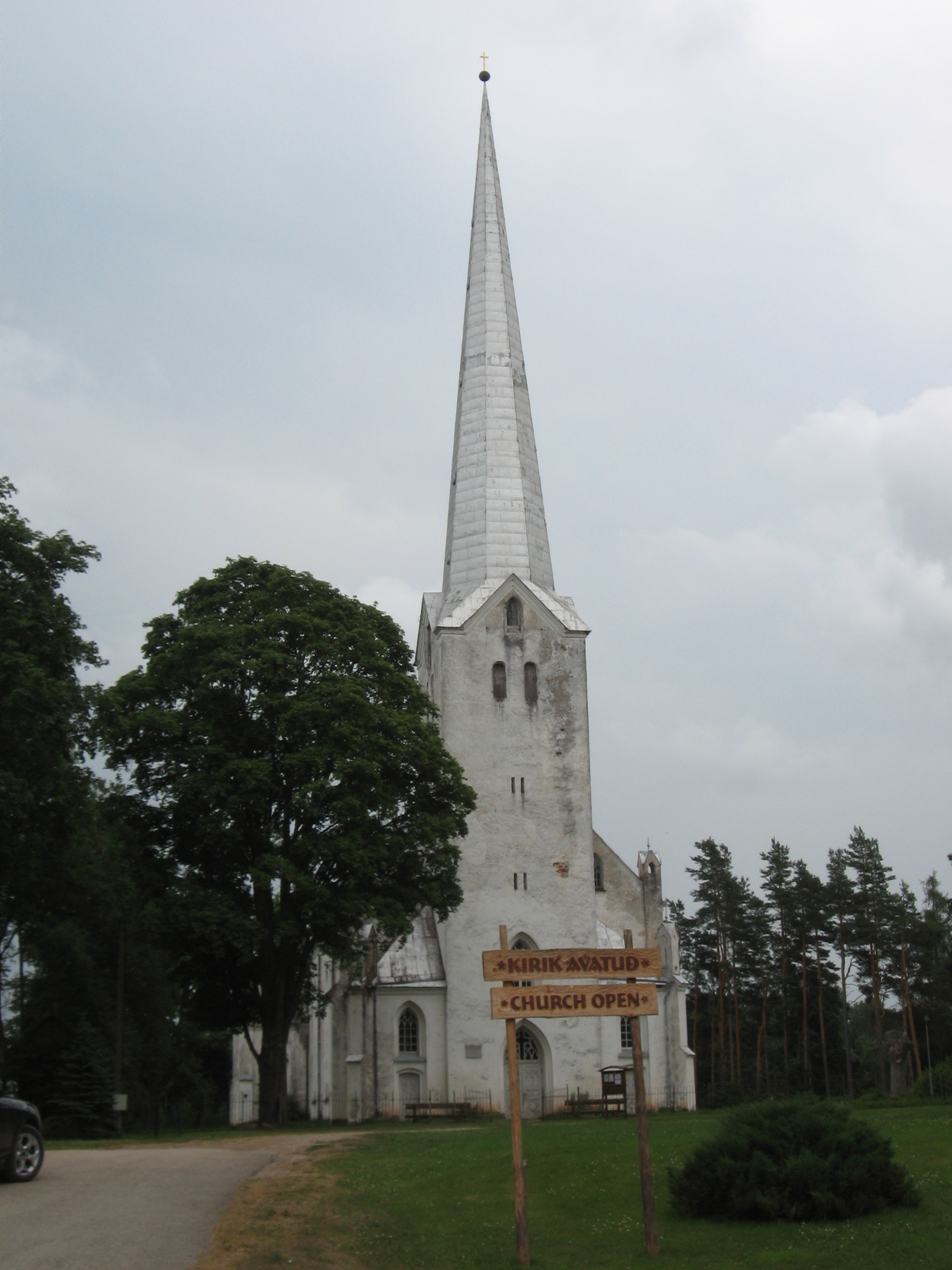
Tarvastu Church in the nearby village of Porsa

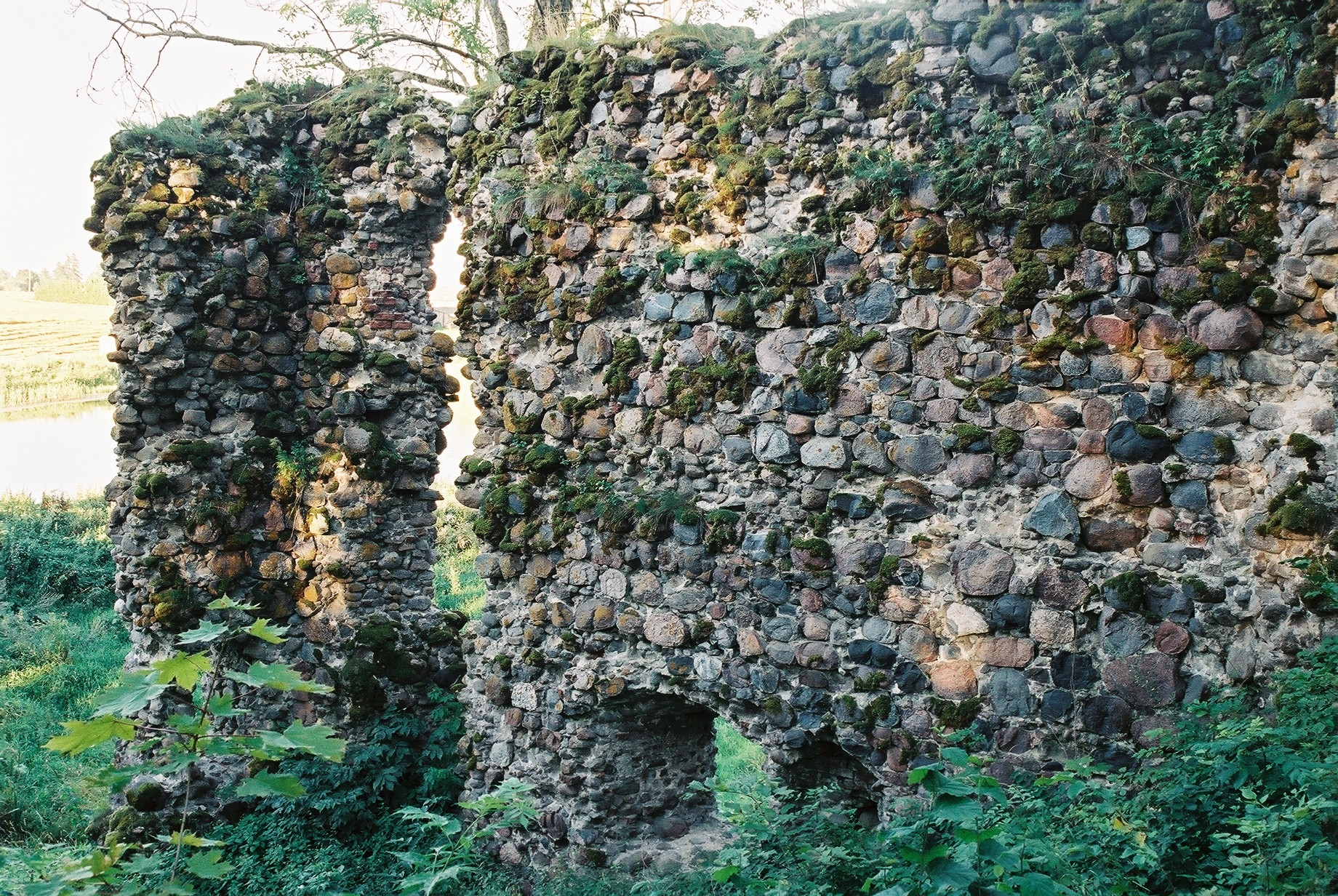
Ruins of Tarvastu Castle in nearby Sooviku

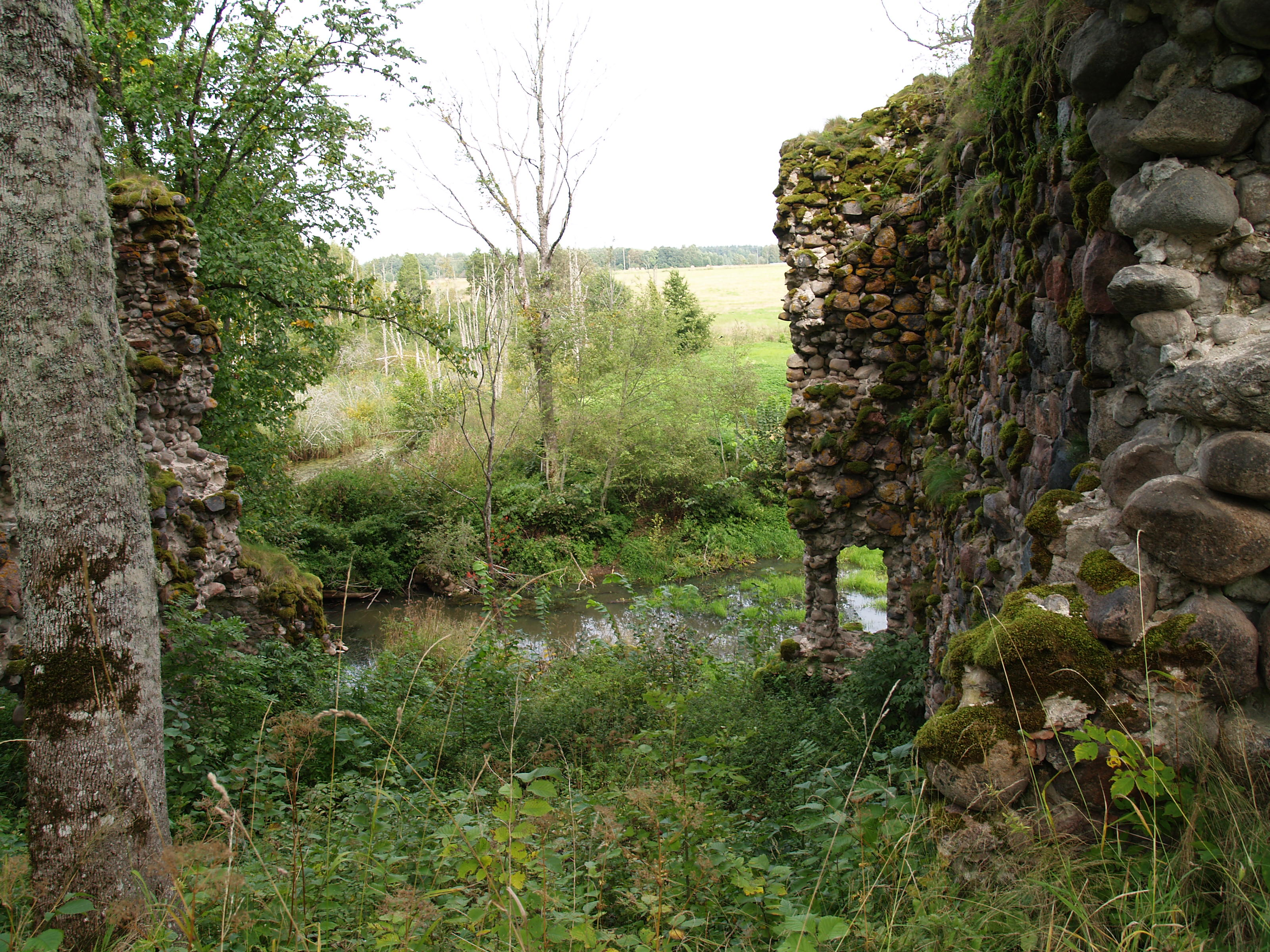
Ruins of Tarvastu Castle

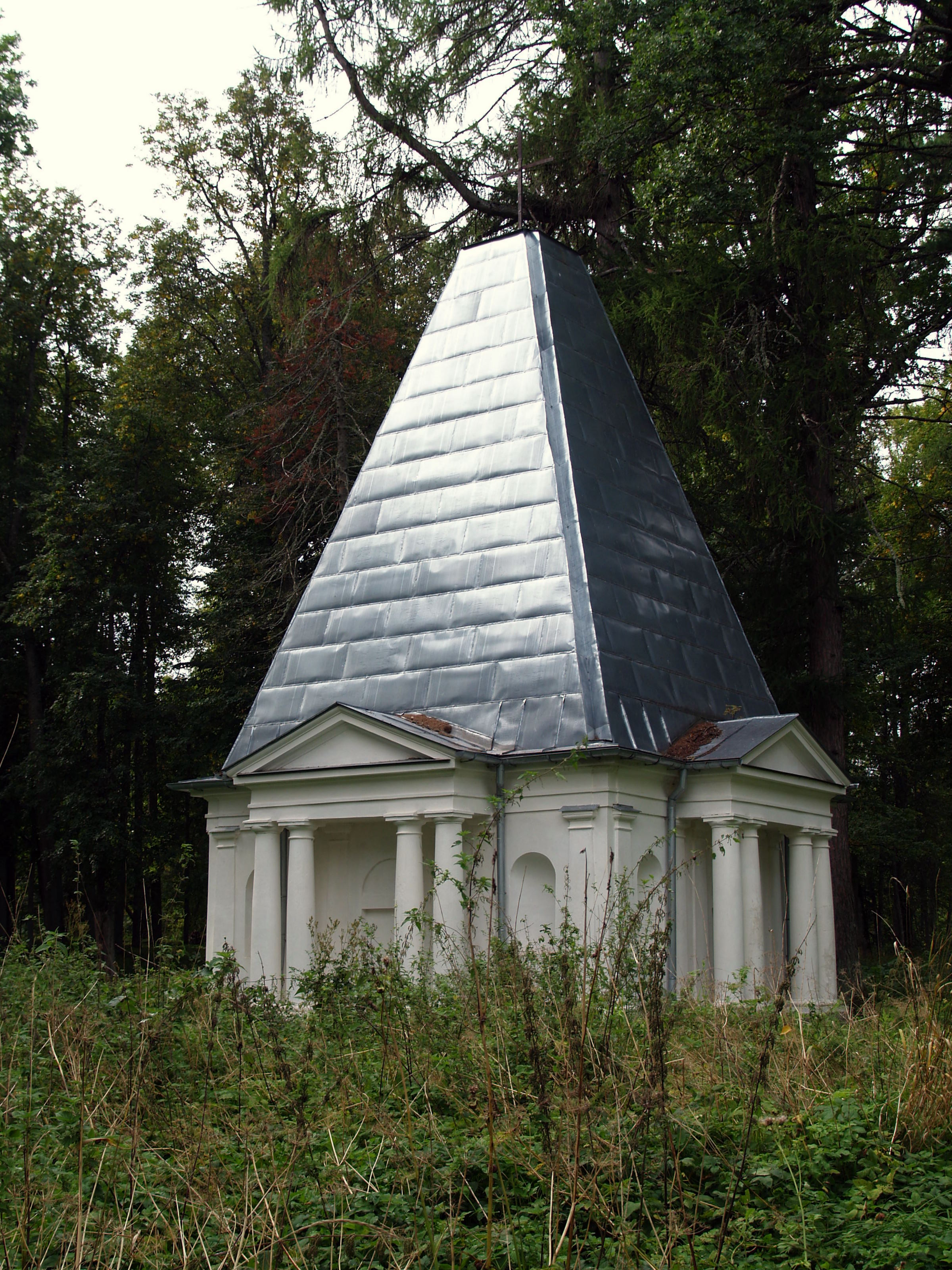
Chapel near the ruins
