= Tarvastu Castle =

Castle in Estonia

- Sooviku, Viljandi Parish, Viljandi County, Estonia
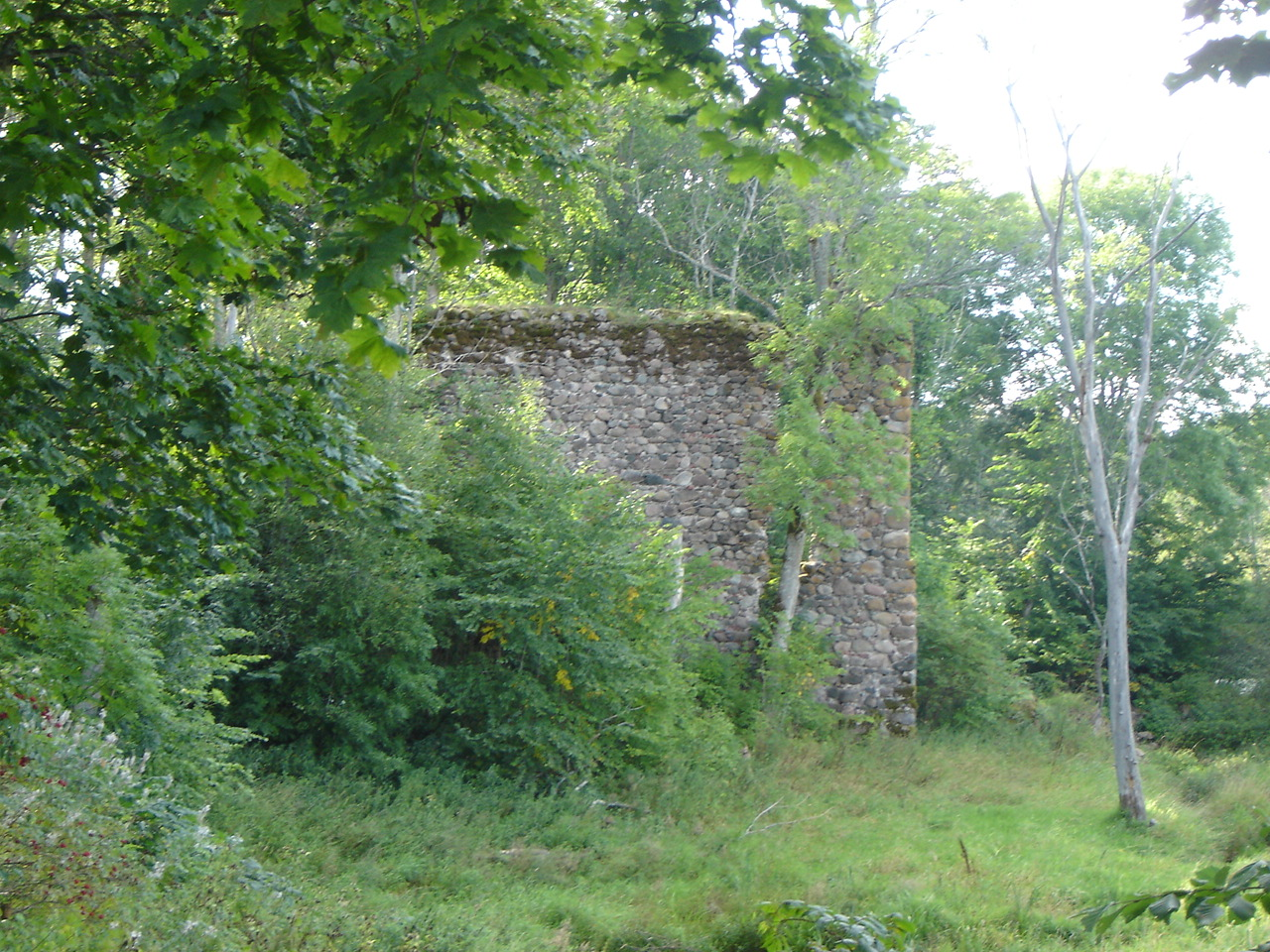

Site information
- Type: Castle

Location
- Coordinates: 58°14′08″N 25°54′05″E

Tarvastu Castle (Estonian: Tarvastu ordulinnus) is a 14th-century castle in Sooviku in Viljandi Parish, Viljandi County, Estonia.

== See also ==
- List of castles in Estonia
