= Vooru =

Village in Estonia

- Village
- Location in Estonia
- Coordinates: 58°07′58″N 25°57′25″E
- Country: Estonia
- County: Viljandi County
- Municipality: Viljandi Parish

Population (2011)
  - Total: 65

Vooru (locally, Vuuru) is a village in Viljandi Parish, Viljandi County, Estonia. It is 34 km (21 miles) southeast of the town of Viljandi, 2 km (1 mile) south of the village of Suislepa, near the southern border of Valga County and the Õhne river. As of 2011, the population of Vooru was 65, a decrease from 101 in the 2000 census.

The ruins of the pre-Christian Vooru Castle hill fort are located in Vooru. The castle was built in the mid-6th to 7th centuries AD and was in use until the 11th century. It was the largest stronghold of the native Livonian population in Viljandi County from that era. Archaeological excavations of the ruins in 1969-1970 revealed that the stronghold was burned down on at least three occasions before being abandoned. The site is now on the National Register of Cultural Monuments.

The first recorded mention of Vooru (German: Worroküll) as a settlement was in 1583, where a manor house built by Baltic German nobility stood. A later manor house and outbuildings were built sometime in the 18th century. Baltic German writer August von Kotzebue lived at the manor briefly in 1800 following his arrest en route to Saint Petersburg from Tallinn (then, Reval) after being accused of being a Jacobin. von Kotzebue was deported to Siberia. However, he had written a comedy which flattered the vanity of Paul I of Russia and he was quickly released and presented with the Vooru estate from the crown lands of Livonia as compensation. von Kotzebue later wrote about this period in his life in the autobiographical Das merkwürdigste Jahr meines Lebens (The Strangest Year of My Life).

Following the Estonian War of Independence, in 1920, Vooru was classified as a settlement and in 1945, the local church was incorporated into the settlement. In 1977, the settlements of Arakumäe, Kõksi and Suureküla were merged with Vooru to create the village of Vooru.

Vooru is the birthplace of Estonian poet Martin Lipp (1854–1923), who is best known as the author of the poem "The Estonian Flag", which was set to the music of composer Enn Võrk.
