= Anikatsi =

Village in Estonia

- Village
- Location in Estonia
- Coordinates: 58°8′57″N 25°44′26″E
- Country: Estonia
- County: Viljandi County
- Municipality: Viljandi Parish

Population (2011)
  - Total: 102

Anikatsi is a village in Viljandi Parish, Viljandi County, Estonia. Until the 2017 administrative reform of Estonian municipalities, the village was located in Tarvastu Parish. Anikatsi is located 35 km (21 miles) southeast of the town of Viljandi and 3 km (2 miles) west of the village of Kärstna. As of 2011, the population of Anikatsi was 102.

The village of Anikatsi is first recorded in German chronicles as Anikatz. Other archaic variations of the village name that were recorded have been Hannikaste (1624), Hannikast (1638), and Annikats (1797).
