= Ülensi =

Village in Estonia

- Village
- Location in Estonia
- Coordinates: 58°14′30″N 25°51′18″E
- Country: Estonia
- County: Viljandi County
- Municipality: Viljandi Parish

Population (2012)
  - Total: 113

Ülensi is a village in Viljandi Parish, Viljandi County, Estonia. Until the 2017 administrative reform of Estonian municipalities, the village was located in Tarvastu Parish. It is approximately 4.4 km (2.7 miles) northwest of the borough of Mustla and 40 km (25 miles) southeast of the town of Viljandi. The village has a population of 113 people as of 2012.

In 1998, the Lusika tourism farm in Ülensi won the President of Estonia's award for the most beautiful home decoration.
