= Soe, Viljandi County =

Village in Estonia

Soe
- Village
- Location in Estonia
- Coordinates: 58°12′48″N 25°55′41″E
- Country: Estonia
- County: Viljandi County
- Municipality: Viljandi Parish

Population (2011)
  - Total: 261

Soe is a village in Viljandi Parish, Viljandi County, Estonia. Until the 2017 administrative reform of Estonian municipalities the village was located in Tarvastu Parish. Soe is 26 km (16 miles) southeast of the town of Viljandi near the western shore of Võrtsjärv lake. As of 2011, it had a population of 261, a decrease from 315 in the 2000 census.
