= Ämmuste =

- Village
- Location in Estonia
- Coordinates: 58°10′55″N 25°49′02″E
- Country: Estonia
- County: Viljandi County
- Municipality: Viljandi Parish

Population (2011)
  - Total: 15

Ämmuste is a village in Viljandi Parish, Viljandi County, Estonia. Until the 2017 administrative reform of Estonian municipalities the village was located in Tarvastu Parish. It is located 6.4 km (3.9 miles) south of the small borough of Mustla and 24 km (14.9 miles) southwest of the town of Viljandi near the border of Valga County. As of 2011, Ämmuste had a population of 15 residents, a decrease from 22 in the 2000 census. These figures, however, do not reflect the population number when students and faculty of Ämmuste School are factored in.

Ämmuste is home to Ämmuste Kool (Ämmuste School), an educational facility founded in 1825 that boards approximately 80 special needs students from Viljandi and Valga Counties and a staff of 43 individuals in three buildings.
