= Suislepa =

Village in Estonia

- Village
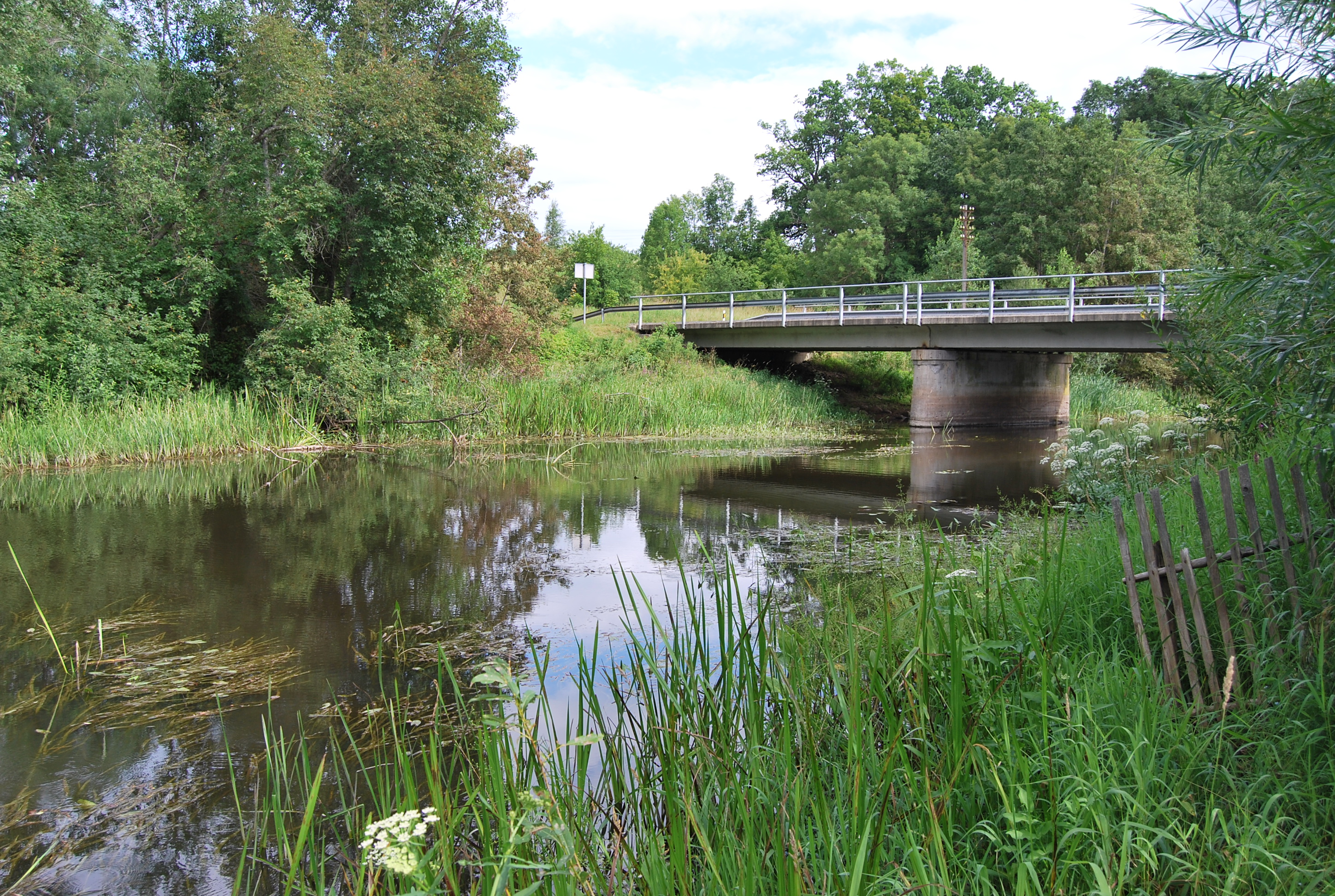
- Bridge over the Õhne River in Suislepa

- Location in Estonia
- Coordinates: 58°08′59″N 25°57′25″E
- Country: Estonia
- County: Viljandi County
- Municipality: Viljandi Parish

Population (2014)
  - Total: 305

Suislepa is a village in Viljandi Parish, Viljandi County, Estonia. Until the 2017 administrative reform of Estonian municipalities the village was located in Tarvastu Parish.The population as of 2014 was 305 people. It is 42 km (26 miles) southeast of the town of Viljandi, near the southern coast of Lake Võrts.

== History ==
The village is situated along the Õhne River (also called the Suislepa, Omuli, and Omeli), first mentioned in 1478 in the German chronicles Omelsche Hecke by Baltic German settlers. In the 17th century, the German nobles Jürgen Schütte Bultler and Franz Scutten began building a large manor in Suislepa. The estate changed hands multiple times before falling into ruin by the early 19th century. In 1805, Major Karl Gustav von Krüdener Moritz, the son of German Baron von Mengden, began construction on the new Suislepa manor house and outbuildings. Completed in 1811, the new mansion was built high on the left bank of the Õhne River. After nationalization by the Soviet authorities in 1940, the manor became a school for many years. Today, the main manor house is home to a preschool and a library. The manor also has a plaque dedicated to the victims of the Great Famine of Estonia (1695–97), which claimed the lives of roughly one-fifth of the Estonian and Livonian population (70,000–75,000 people).

The name Suislepa is familiar to many Estonians thanks to the Suislepa apple cultivar, which originates from the orchard of the older manor. A commemorative stone now marks the place where the parent tree of the popular cultivar once grew.

Suislepa was once home to Suislepa Airfield (also known as Obriku Airfield), a Soviet-era military airbase used mainly in the 1960s as a frontline bomber airfield. The airfield has since been disassembled and abandoned.

Every June the village holds Suislepa Boat Day, a celebration that includes boat races, live music, and other festivities.

== Gallery ==
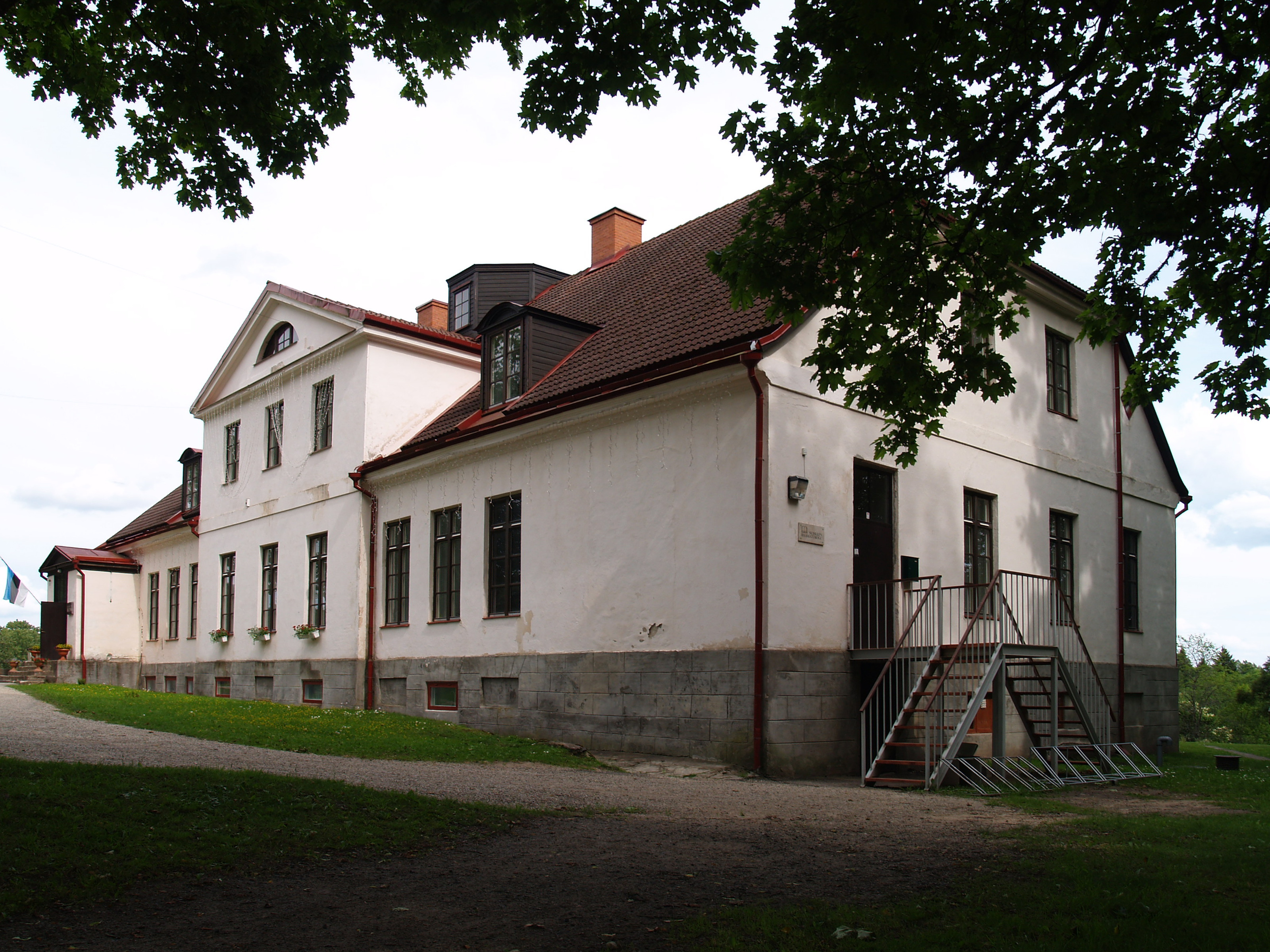
New Suislepa manor house

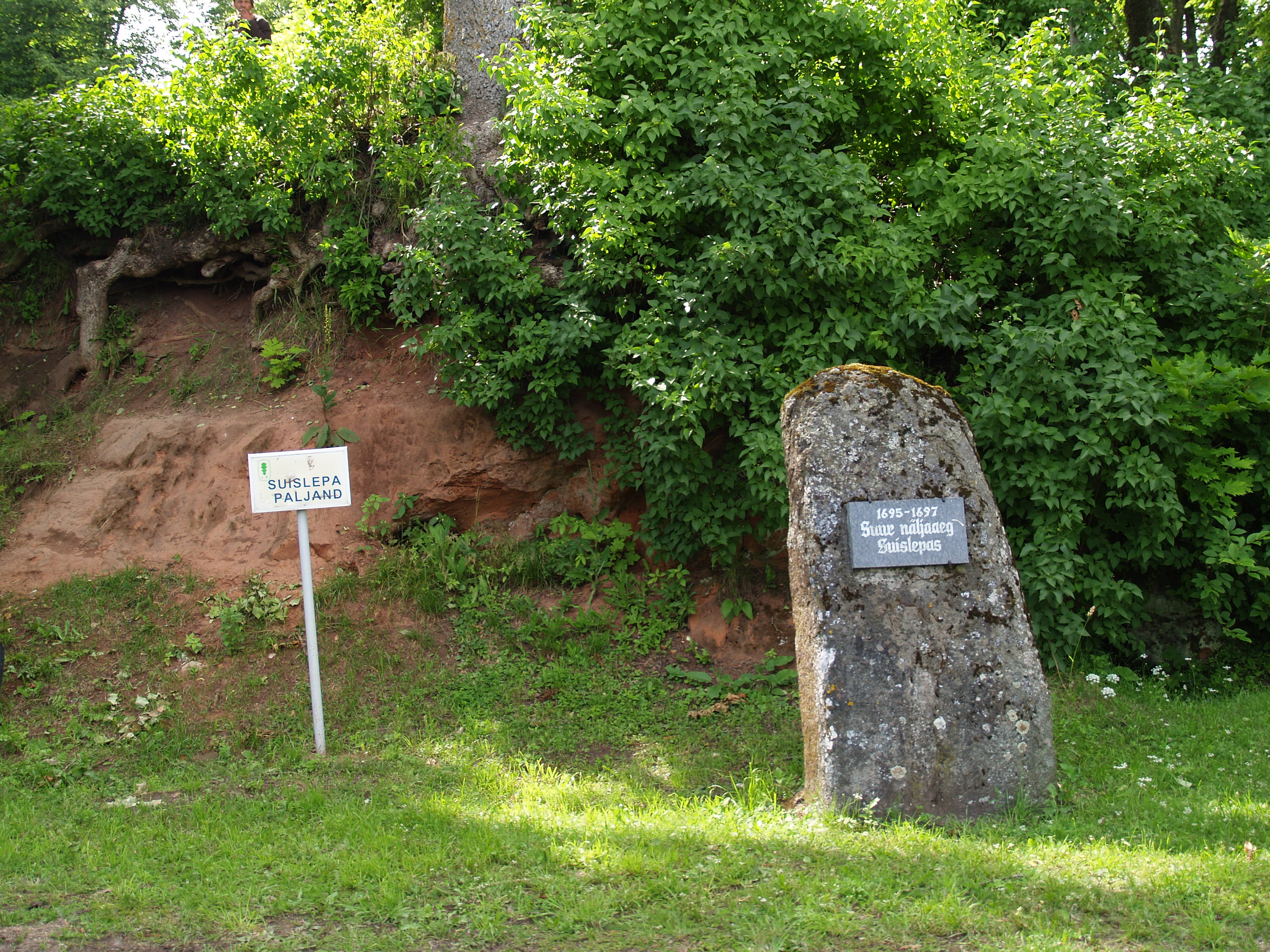
Suislepa outcrop and famine memorial stone

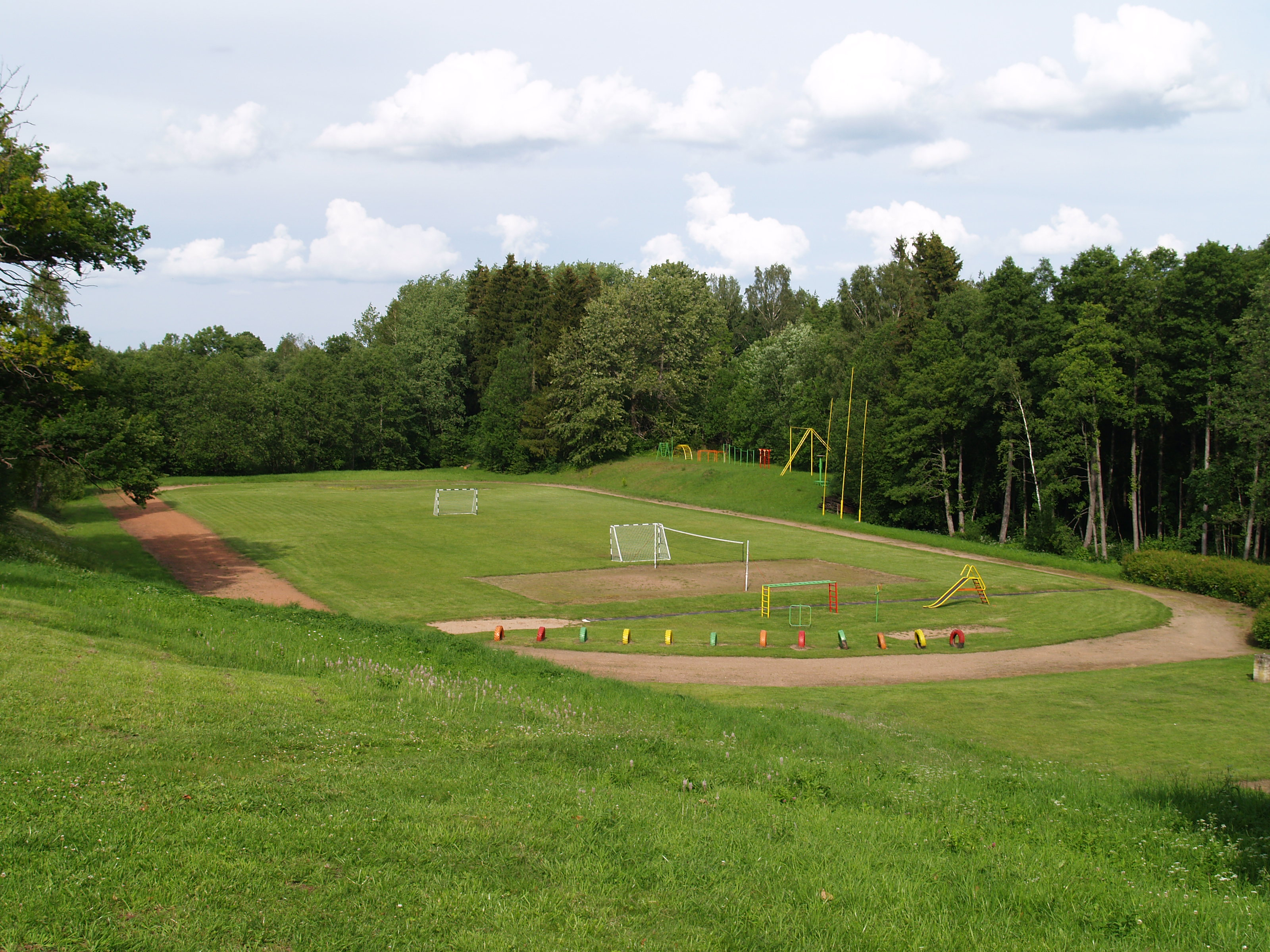
Suislepa stadium

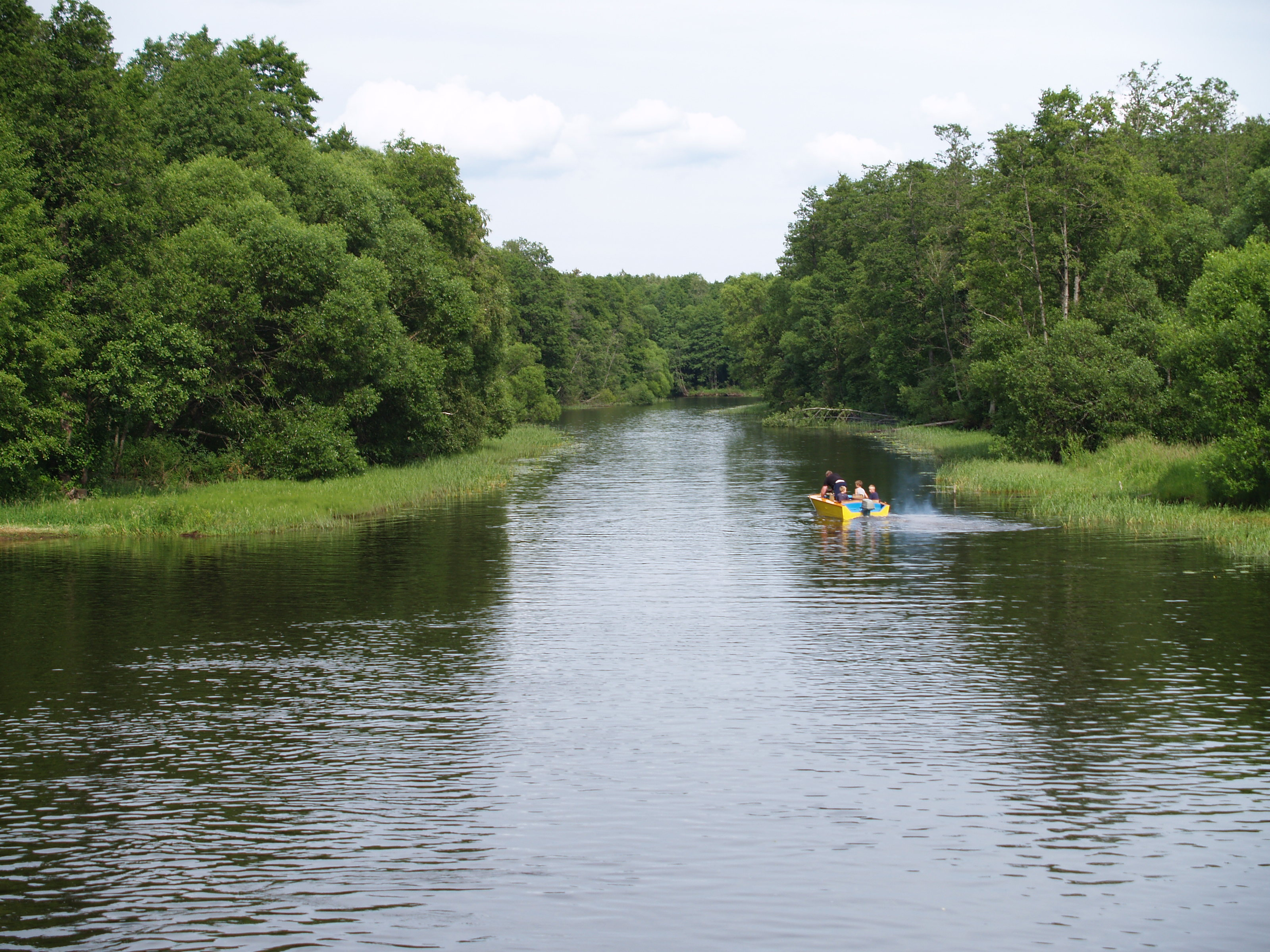
The Õhne River in Suislepa
