= Mustla =

Borough in Estonia

- Location within Estonia
- Coordinates: 58°14′06″N 25°51′47″E
- Country: Estonia
- County: Viljandi County
- Parish: Viljandi Parish

Population (2011 Census)
  - Total: 818
- Time zone: UTC+2 (EET)

Mustla is a small borough (alevik) in Viljandi Parish, Viljandi County, Estonia. As of the 2011 census, the settlement's population was 818.

From 1938–1979, Mustla was a town with town privileges.

In June 2018, a plaque commemorating Alfons Rebane was unveiled on the wall of a private building in Mustla where he had lived. The Russian Ministry of Foreign Affairs protested the unveiling.

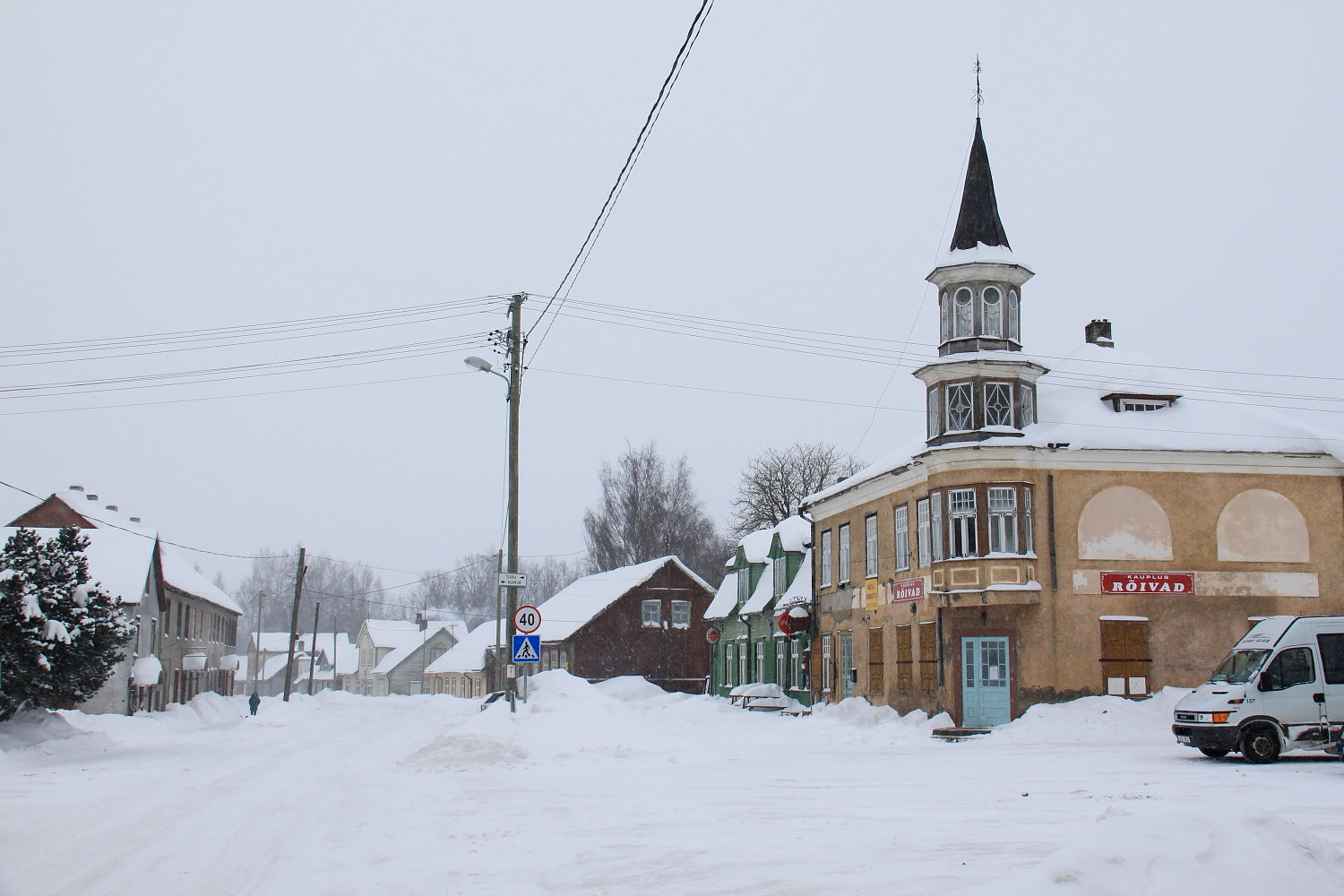
Mustla in winter

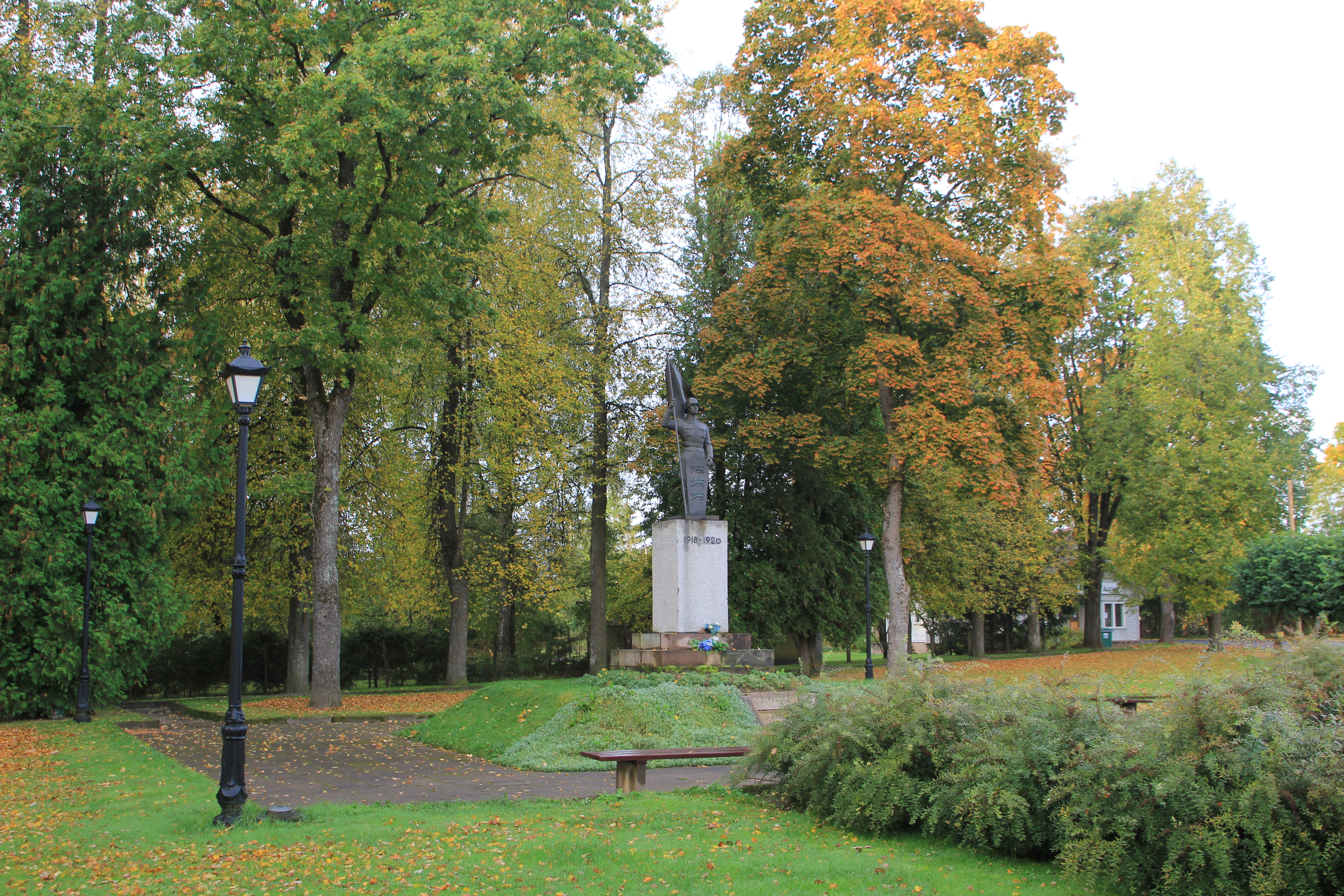
Monument to the Estonian War of Independence

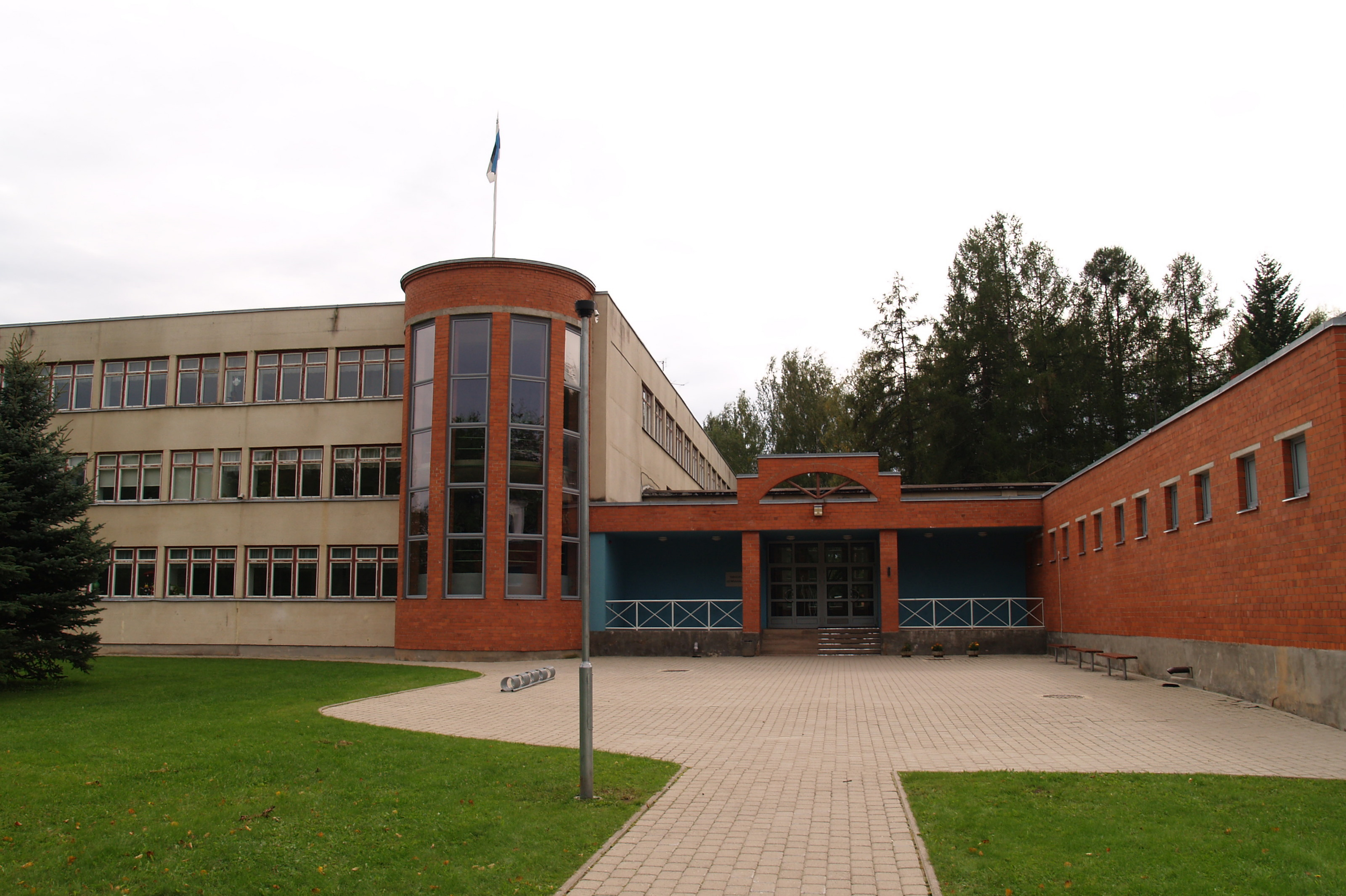
Gymnasium
