= Liisu Mägi =

Estonian folk singer (1831–1926)

Liisu Mägi, also known as Puru Liisu and Laulu-Liisu, (16 December 1831 – 17 January 1926) was an Estonian folk singer and wedding singer in Mulgimaa and Southern Viljandi County. She was also known for creating or writing down thousands of local folk songs of life, death, war and epic events.

== Biography ==
According to some accounts, Liisu was born on 16 December 1831, in the Kutsiku tavern in Holstre parish. According to other sources, she was born on 16 December 1833 and died on 17 January 1926. Liisu Mägi lived and worked mainly in Paistu parish, Viljandi County, Mulgimaa in Estonia.

Liisu Mägi's biography and many songs were written down by Oskar Loorits, who went to the Holstre area to collect folklore, and whose manuscript Folk songs, games and words from Puru Liisult Holstret was written in December 1921. The manuscript is 122 pages long and contains Liisu Mägi's biography.

According to Oskar Loorits, the nickname "Puru" belonged to Liisu Mägi's father. As a child of poor parents, Liisu was left to fend for herself and live independently from a young age. For example, she was put to work as a helper in a tavern when she was a child, and later she worked at farms where she found shelter. Despite her difficult childhood, Liisu already had a drive. Oskar Loorits describes Liisu's youth as follows: "Liisu continued to have energy for beauty and song, and she won fame as a singer early on." Although Liisu was described as a beautiful girl, a pioneer in her activities and even known as a singer – no serious suitors were found for her. Young men seemed happy to visit Liisu and spend time with her, but none of them dared to marry the poor slave. Liisu remained independent and unmarried for her entire life. Still, she was not alone as she gave birth to two daughters and two sons, all illegitimate.

Throughout her life, Liisu challenged local prevailing customs. In church, as an unmarried woman, she was not permitted to wear a headscarf and apron, yet she insisted on doing so despite her marital status.

Under the name Puru Liisu, the singer was known throughout the parishes of Paistu, Tarvastu and Viljandi. She often performed at weddings, adapting her lyrics to the place and circumstances so aptly that they always seemed fresh and interesting. She never lacked words and people listened to her willingly until late at night. An excerpt from the Loorits' manuscript says: "But when her words light up, the little one becomes a seer again – and her gaze and her words conjure up centuries of the past, a blind ancient singer rises like a tomb and strikes all the strings on the resounding harp of the soul of the present man. The singer soon even falls into ecstasy, a selection of verses escapes the barrier – and it is strange to see how the singer seems to be exalted, how her voice becomes majestic, her posture straight and proud, how she throws her head up high and how she sometimes taps the beat with her foot and shouts with natural force: Hõissaa! And then the singer charms her listeners."

Over the years, she lived and worked in many places, including in Pärnu County in the summer and Holstre in the winter. In her old age, she moved in with her daughter and son-in-law in the Holstre manor area. For the last fifteen years of her life, Liisu was blind, but despite this, she was mobile and healthy. She remained in a good mood, talked and listened to village news, and sang as long as she lived. Liisu Mägi died on 17 January 1926 and was buried in Paistu cemetery.

== Liisu's song creation ==
Liisu Mägi was known as a singer throughout the Estonian parishes of Paistu, Tarvastu and Viljandi. She performed as a singer at weddings. The singers (repeaters of the words) were usually men from Pirmastu village, Tilli Juhan and Länkru Jaan. In addition to wishes and praises, Puru described the bride, groom and relatives. She knew the people of the parish well. She had to endure fair criticism conveyed in mocking words and songs. On farms where there were daughters, Liisu was used as a matchmaker. Puru Liisu's repertoire included harvests, flowers, swings and wedding songs, as well as Midsummer, Mardi Gras and Christmas songs. Frequent performances at weddings and competitions with other singers helped to increase the number of songs in her collection. She wrote down over 9,000 songs that were performed at weddings and other parties.

In his manuscript, Loorits described how Puru Liisu wrote the songs she heard from other people even as it was being performed. One section of the songs also describes how words or syllables were stressed, which were stretched and how intonation was used. She indicated that by putting special symbols on the written music.

== The song-play "Liisu" ==
On the occasion of the 780th anniversary of the first celebration of Paistu, the local drama company, together with guests from the Tänassilma community center, performed a play consisting of songs about Liisu Mägi. The director of the Paistu community center commissioned the song-play "Puru Liisu’s story – Mulgi’s song play. How could it have been…" from Kauksi Ülle in 2013. As of 2023, the play remains in manuscript form and unpublished. The play was originally written in the Võru language and its content is based on Mulgi's folk songs from various folk song books, local newspaper articles and published books by local historians, events that occurred during Liisu’s lifetime, and well known people who lived and worked in Holstre rural municipality and Viljandi County at the same time. For example, in the song-play, Paistu parish school teacher Friedrich August Saebelmann invites local farm girls to sing in a mixed choir at the school. Local landlords Hain Henno, Adam Peterson, Hans Ainson and Jaan Adamson discuss the need for their own Estonian-language free school and decide to send a petition to the Russian emperor demanding the abolition of serfdom and corporal punishment.

The premiere performance of the song-play "Liisu" took place at Paistu Community Center on 1 August 2014. Director Andres Linnupuu staged it in an unconventional way: the venue's floor was covered with straw and included bales of straw. A video ran on the screen behind the actors and a musical background was added, which tied the story that has been going on for decades into a single whole and helped the spectators and actors reach the next decade. The audience sat on the stage and on chairs brought in front of the stage. In this way, the actors were on the same level as the audience, and the performance sometimes brought actors into the middle of the audience. The song-play received the main prize at the Viljandi and Pärnu County Amateur Theater Festival.

Critic Enn Siimer wrote: “As the story developed, either everyone performed in a joint song-dance-game or one or the other of the characters. Puru Liisu as a child, a young stubborn girl, a mother, and finally a blind song-mother. The production was sympathetic and nicely revived local history, which also includes a number of well-known cultural figures from the Estonian national awakening, such as Hain Henno, Ado Reinvald and Friedrich Saebelmann. While there was mostly sharp conflict between Taarka and the village community, Puru Liisu was respected and revered. Her stubbornness was evident in her relationship with the local German-speaking pastor, and this gave color and tension to the production.”

In his review, Siimer compares the folk singer Puru Liisu to the Seto song mother Hilana Taarka. He noted that the two women had similar life paths – both remained single until the end of their lives, but still became mothers and lived long lives. By creating songs and verses, both singers remained in people's minds and memories.
