= Paistu =

Village in Viljandi, Estonia

- Village
- Location in Estonia
- Coordinates: 58°16′15″N 25°37′28″E
- Country: Estonia
- County: Viljandi County
- Municipality: Viljandi Parish

Population
  - Total: ~350

Paistu is a village in Viljandi Parish, Viljandi County, Estonia. Until October 2013, it was the administrative centre of Paistu Parish and has a population of ~350. Paistu is located on the Sakala Uplands, on the watershed between Lake Peipsi and the Pärnu River. The Viraski Stream originates near the village centre, and the Sulaoja flows along the village's northwestern border. The Paistu Church and Paistu Cemetery are located in the village. Paistu village lies at the centre of the Loodi Nature Park, connecting two parts of the nature park.

== History ==
The beginning of Paistu's history is considered to be the year 1234, when the place name was first mentioned in historical records in connection with the church. The Paistu Parish School operated in Paistu, where many important figures of the national awakening, statesmen, and scholars studied, taught, and lived.

== Sights ==
Paistu Church (also Paistu St Mary's Church); Main building of the Paistu Parsonage; Paistu Community House; Memorial to those who fell in the War of Independence and to the deported; Sculpture of a Mulgi man, by L. Armväärt, H. Roots-Looveer, J.-A. Looveer, 2008; Loodi Hell Valley (Põrguorg) and hiking trail; Paistu Cemetery
