= Ebavere Landscape Conservation Area =

Protected area in Estonia

- Location within Estonia
- Location: Estonia
- Coordinates: 59°06′10″N 26°13′20″E
- Area: 40 ha (99 acres)
- Established: 1959 (2016)

Ebavere Landscape Conservation Area is a nature park situated in Lääne-Viru County, Estonia.

Its area is 40 ha.

The protected area was designated in 1959 to protect Ebavere Hill and its surrounding areas. In 2016, the protected area was redesigned to the landscape conservation area.
