= Sakala Upland =

Upland in Estonia

Coordinates: 58°02′36″N 25°39′22″E

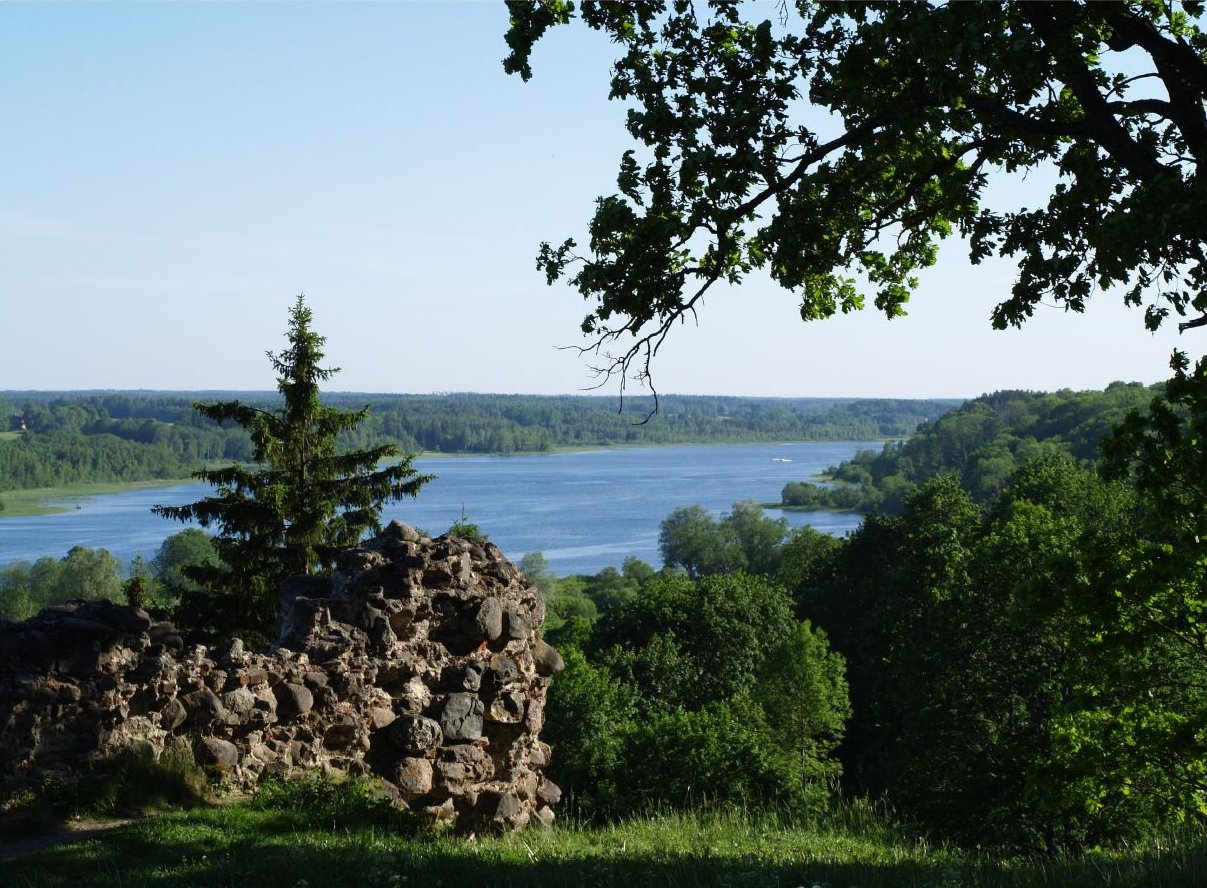
Viljandi Ancient Valley is part of Sakala Upland. Viljandi Lake is located in valley's bottom

Sakala Upland (Estonian: Sakala kõrgustik) is hilly area of higher elevation in Southern Estonia. Upland's area is about 2792 km2.

The highest point of upland is Härjassaare Hill (147 m).

About 1/4 of upland is taken under protection. The biggest protection area is Loodi Landscape Conservation Area.
