= Mäetaguse Landscape Conservation Area =

Protected area in Estonia

- Location within Estonia
- Location: Estonia
- Coordinates: 59°13′30″N 27°19′20″E
- Area: 53 ha (130 acres)
- Established: 1965 (2006)

Mäetaguse Landscape Conservation Area was a nature park which was located in Ida-Viru County, Estonia.

The area of the nature park was 53 ha.

The protected area was founded in 1965 to protect Mäetaguse oaks forest and Mäetaguse Park. In 2006, the protected area was designated to the landscape conservation area. In 2020, the landscape conservation area was incorporated to Alutaguse National Park.
