= Kassi, Viljandi County =

Village in Estonia

Kassi
- Village
- Location in Estonia
- Coordinates: 58°13′46″N 25°39′49″E
- Country: Estonia
- County: Viljandi County
- Municipality: Viljandi Parish

Kassi is a village in Viljandi Parish, Viljandi County, Estonia. It was a part of Paistu Parish until 2013.
