= Rebase, Viljandi County =

Village in Estonia

Rebase
- Village
- Location in Estonia
- Coordinates: 58°18′38″N 25°41′40″E
- Country: Estonia
- County: Viljandi County
- Municipality: Viljandi Parish

Rebase is a village in Viljandi Parish, Viljandi County, Estonia. It was a part of Paistu Parish until 2013.
