= Tilleorg Landscape Conservation Area =

Protected area in Estonia

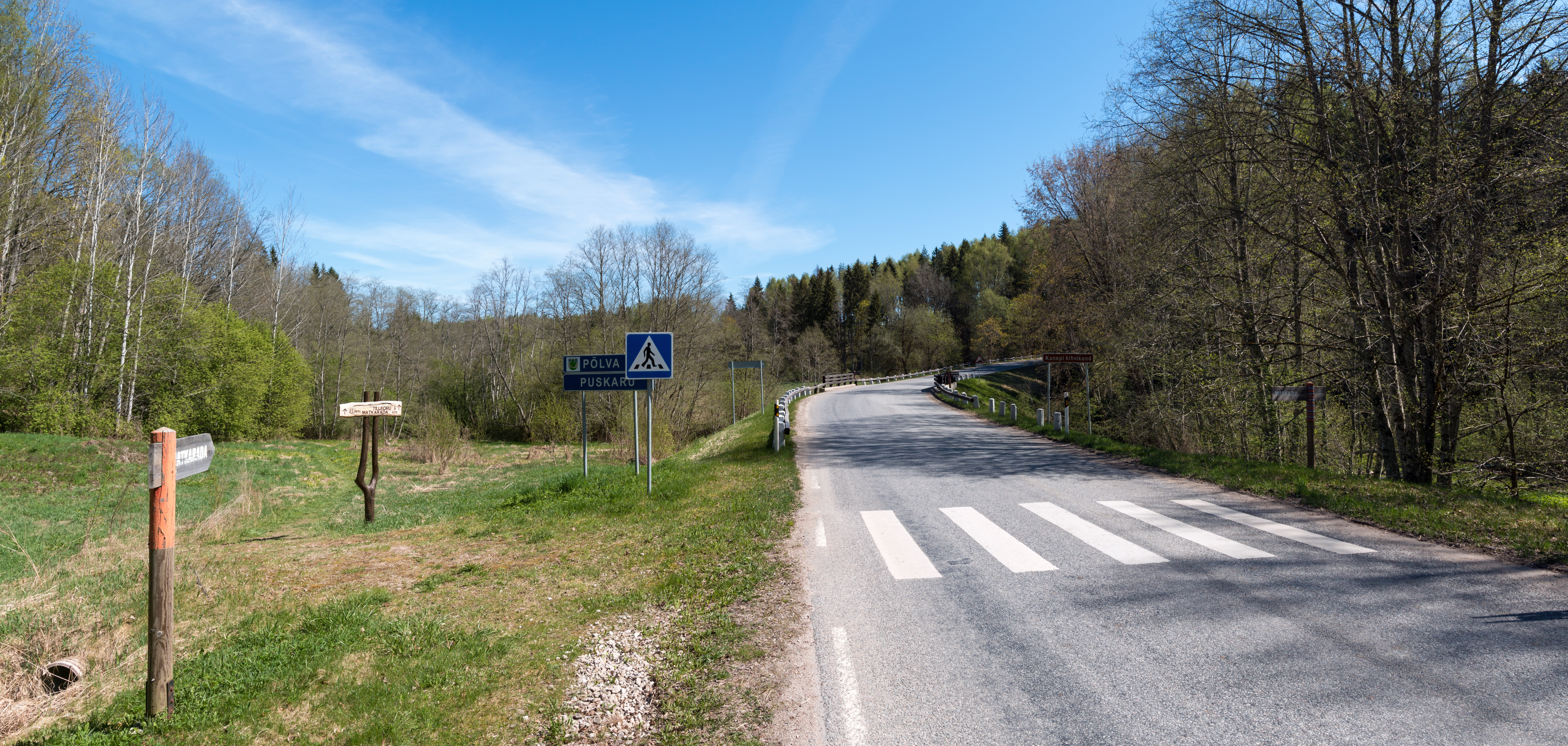

- Location within Estonia
- Location: Estonia
- Coordinates: 58°01′30″N 26°55′30″E
- Area: 146 ha (360 acres)
- Established: 1957 (2014)

Tilleorg Landscape Conservation Area (Estonian: Tilleoru maastikukaitseala) is a nature park in Põlva County, Estonia.

The area of the nature park is 146 ha.

The protected area was founded in 1957 to protect Tilleorg Valley.
