= Jõuga Landscape Conservation Area =

Protected area in Estonia

- Location within Estonia
- Location: Estonia
- Coordinates: 59°10′07″N 27°25′27″E
- Area: 304 ha (750 acres)
- Established: 1991 (2017)

Jõuga Landscape Conservation Area was a nature park in Ida-Viru County, Estonia. In 2021, it was incorporated with Alutaguse National Park.

Its area was 304 hectares (750 acres).

The protected area was designated in 1996 as Kivinõmme Landscape Conservation Area. In 2017, the protected area was renamed Jõuga Landscape Conservation Area.
