= 2025–26 Cincinnati Bearcats men's basketball team =

American college basketball season

2025–26 Cincinnati Bearcats men's basketball
- Conference: Big 12 Conference
- Record: 18–15 (9–9 Big 12)
- Head coach: Wes Miller (5th season)
- Associate head coach: Chad Dollar (5th season)
- Assistant coaches: Andre Morgan (5th season); Tim Buckley (2nd season); Jaylen Stowe (2nd season); Mamadou N'Diaye (1st season)
- Home arena: Fifth Third Arena

2025–26 Big 12 men's basketball standings
	Conf.				Overall
Team	W		L	PCT	W		L	PCT
No. 2 Arizona †	16	–	2	.889	32	–	2	.941
No. 5 Houston	14	–	4	.778	28	–	6	.824
No. 14 Kansas	12	–	6	.667	23	–	10	.697
No. 16 Texas Tech	12	–	6	.667	22	–	10	.688
No. 7 Iowa State	12	–	6	.667	27	–	7	.794
TCU	11	–	7	.611	22	–	11	.667
West Virginia	9	–	9	.500	18	–	14	.563
UCF	9	–	9	.500	21	–	11	.656
Cincinnati	9	–	9	.500	18	–	15	.545
BYU	9	–	9	.500	23	–	11	.676
Colorado	7	–	11	.389	17	–	15	.531
Arizona State	7	–	11	.389	17	–	16	.515
Baylor	6	–	12	.333	16	–	16	.500
Oklahoma State	6	–	12	.333	19	–	14	.576
Kansas State	3	–	15	.167	12	–	20	.375
Utah	2	–	16	.111	10	–	22	.313
† 2026 Big 12 tournament winner As of March 13, 2026; Rankings from AP poll

The 2025–26 Cincinnati Bearcats men's basketball team represented the University of Cincinnati during the 2025–26 NCAA Division I men's basketball season. The Bearcats, led by fifth-year head coach Wes Miller, played their home games at Fifth Third Arena in Cincinnati, Ohio as third-year members of the Big 12 Conference.

== Previous season ==
The Bearcats finished the season 19–16 and 7–13 in Big 12 play to finish in tie for 12th place in the conference standings, thus earning the 13th seed in the 2025 Big 12 men's basketball tournament. They defeated Oklahoma State in the first round before losing to Iowa State in the second round.

The Bearcats were invited to play in inaugural College Basketball Crown, a single-elimination, fully-bracketed men's college basketball postseason tournament featuring sixteen National Collegiate Athletic Association (NCAA) Division I teams not selected to participate in the NCAA Division I men's basketball tournament. In their first round game, they defeated DePaul and lost to fellow Big 12 Conference opponent UCF in their quarterfinals game, 88–80.

== Offseason ==
=== Coaching staff changes ===
Former assistant coach Drew Adams accepted an assistant coach job with Indiana, following two years at Cincinnati. Mamadou N'Diaye accepted the assistant coaching vacancy after spending the previous four seasons at UCF.

=== Departures ===
Any players who have declared for the 2025 NBA draft—including seniors, who must opt into this year's draft—have the option to return if they make a timely withdrawal from the draft and end any pre-draft relationships with agents. Thus, separate lists will initially be maintained for confirmed and potential departures.

Cincinnati Departing Players
Name	Pos.	Height	Weight	Year	Hometown	Reason
CJ Anthony	G	6' 0"	195	Senior	Columbus, OH	Transferred to Iona
Aziz Bandaogo	C	7' 0"	235	Graduate student	Dakar, Senegal	Completed college eligibility
Tyler Betsey	F	6' 8"	225	Freshman	Windsor, CT	Transferred to Syracuse
Rayvon Griffith	G/F	6' 6"	210	(redshirt) Freshman	Cincinnati, OH	Transferred to Kent State
Connor Hickman	G	6' 3"	200	Senior	Bloomington, IN	Transferred to Charleston
Jizzle James	G	6' 3"	205	Sophomore	Orlando, FL	~~Dismissed from program~~
Simas Lukošius	F	6' 8"	225	Senior	Kaunas, Lithuania	Completed college eligibility
Dillon Mitchell	PF	6' 8"	210	Junior	Tampa, FL	Transferred to St. John's
Arrinten Page	C	6' 11"	240	Sophomore	Atlanta, GA	Transferred to Northwestern
Josh Reed	G	6' 7"	220	Junior	Atlanta, GA	Transferred to Penn State
JJ Rembert	G	5' 10"	155	Freshman	Jamaica, Queens, N.Y.	Transferred to McNeese
Dan Skillings Jr.	SF	6' 6"	210	Junior	Blackwood, N.J.	Transferred to Baylor

=== Incoming transfers ===
Cincinnati incoming transfers
Name	Number	Pos.	Height	Weight	Year	Hometown	Old school	Remaining Eligibility
Jalen Celestine	32	G	6' 7"	215	Graduate student	Ajax, Ontario	Baylor	One year
Sencire Harris	5	G	6' 4"	175	Junior	Canton, OH	West Virginia	Two years
Jalen Haynes	3	PF	6' 8"	260	Graduate student	Fort Lauderdale, FL	George Mason	One year
Kerr Kriisa	11	PG	6' 3"	185	Graduate student	Vissu Küla, Estonia	Kentucky	One year
Baba Miller	18	C	6' 11"	215	Senior	Mallorca, Spain	Florida Atlantic	One year
Moustapha Thiam	52	C	7' 2"	235	Sophomore	Dakar, Senegal	UCF	Three years

=== Recruiting classes ===
==== 2025 recruiting class ====
College recruiting information (2025)
Name	Hometown	School	Height	Weight	Commit date
Keyshuan Tillery; PG	Albany, NY	New Hampton School	6 ft 0 in (1.83 m)	184 lb (83 kg)	Sep 20, 2024
Keyshuan Tillery; PG	Recruit ratings: Rivals: 247Sports: ESPN: (85)				
Shon Abaev; SF	Fort Lauderdale, FL	Calvary Christian Academy (Florida)	6 ft 8 in (2.03 m)	195 lb (88 kg)	Nov 28, 2024
Shon Abaev; SF	Recruit ratings: Rivals: 247Sports: ESPN: (88)				
Bryson Buckingham; G	Edmond, OK	Link Academy	6 ft 2 in (1.88 m)	180 lb (82 kg)	Jul 4, 2025
Bryson Buckingham; G	Recruit ratings: No ratings found				
Jordi Rodriguez; G	Barcelona, Spain	Grupo Ureta Tizona Burgos	6 ft 6 in (1.98 m)	195 lb (88 kg)	Oct 1, 2025
Jordi Rodriguez; G	Recruit ratings: No ratings found				
Lucas Atauri; G	Campinas, Brazil		6 ft 5 in (1.96 m)	205 lb (93 kg)	Oct 9, 2025
Lucas Atauri; G	Recruit ratings: No ratings found				
Overall recruit ranking:
Note: In many cases, Scout, Rivals, 247Sports, On3, and ESPN may conflict in their listings of height and weight.; In these cases, the average was taken. ESPN grades are on a 100-point scale.; Sources: "Cincinnati 2025 Basketball Commitments". Rivals.; "2025 Cincinnati Basketball Commits". ESPN.; "2024 Team Ranking". Rivals.; "Cincinnati 2025 Basketball Commits". 247Sports.

== Preseason ==
The Big 12 preseason coaches poll was released on October 16, 2025. All awards were voted on by the league's 16 head coaches, who could not vote for their own team or players. The Big 12 preseason media poll was released on October 30, 2025.

Big 12 Preseason Coaches Poll

	Big 12 Coaches	Points
1.	Houston	224 (12)
2.	BYU	204 (1)
3.	Texas Tech	200
4.	Arizona	179 (1)
5.	Iowa State	170
6.	Kansas	163
7.	Baylor	137
8.	Cincinnati	120
9.	Kansas State	117
10.	TCU	90
11.	West Virginia	79
12.	Oklahoma State	77
13.	Utah	50
14.	UCF	39
15.	Colorado	37
16.	Arizona State	34
Reference: (#) first-place votes

Big 12 Preseason Media Poll

	Big 12 Media
1.	Houston
2.	Texas Tech
3.	BYU
4.	Arizona
5.	Iowa State
6.	Kansas
7.	Baylor
8.	Kansas State
9.	Cincinnati
10.	TCU
11.	West Virginia
12.	Oklahoma State
13.	Utah
14.	UCF
15.	Colorado
16.	Arizona State

== Roster ==
2025–26 Cincinnati Bearcats men's basketball team
Players
Coaches

Pos.	#	Name	Height	Weight	Year	Previous school	Hometown
G	0	Bryson Buckingham	6 ft 2 in (1.88 m)	180 lb (82 kg)	Fr	Link Academy	Edmond, OK
G	1	Day Day Thomas	6 ft 1 in (1.85 m)	215 lb (98 kg)	GS	Kilgore College	Columbia, SC
G	2	Jizzle James	6 ft 3 in (1.91 m)	205 lb (93 kg)	So	Olympia High School	Orlando, FL
F	3	Jalen Haynes	6 ft 8 in (2.03 m)	250 lb (113 kg)	GS	George Mason	Fort Lauderdale, FL
G	5	Sencire Harris	6 ft 4 in (1.93 m)	180 lb (82 kg)	Jr	West Virginia	Canton, OH
G	7	Keyshuan Tillery	6 ft 1 in (1.85 m)	190 lb (86 kg)	Fr	New Hampton School	Albany, NY
G	10	Shon Abaev	6 ft 8 in (2.03 m)	210 lb (95 kg)	Fr	Calvary Christian Academy	Broward County, FL
G	11	Kerr Kriisa	6 ft 3 in (1.91 m)	185 lb (84 kg)	GS	Kentucky	Vissu Küla, Estonia
G	13	Grant Darbyshire	6 ft 2 in (1.88 m)	190 lb (86 kg)	GS	Kentucky	Cincinnati, OH
G	14	Lucas Atauri	6 ft 5 in (1.96 m)	205 lb (93 kg)	Fr	Campinas, Brazil
G	17	Jordi Rodriguez	6 ft 6 in (1.98 m)	195 lb (88 kg)	Fr	Grupo Ureta Tizona Burgos	Barcelona, Spain
F	18	Baba Miller	6 ft 11 in (2.11 m)	225 lb (102 kg)	Sr	Florida Atlantic	Mallorca, Spain
F	24	Tyler McKinley	6 ft 9 in (2.06 m)	240 lb (109 kg)	RS Fr	Winton Woods High School	Cincinnati, OH
G	32	Jalen Celestine	6 ft 7 in (2.01 m)	220 lb (100 kg)	GS	Baylor	Ajax, Ontario
G	52	Moustapha Thiam	7 ft 2 in (2.18 m)	250 lb (113 kg)	So	UCF	Dakar, Senegal
F/C	65	Halvine Dzellat	6 ft 10 in (2.08 m)	225 lb (102 kg)	So	ADA Blois Basket 41	Loir-et-Cher, France

Head coach

- Wes Miller (North Carolina)

Assistant coach(es)

- Chad Dollar (South Florida)
- Andre Morgan (North Georgia)
- Drew Adams (Iowa)
- Tim Buckley (Bemidji State)
- Jaylen Stowe (Mercer)

Legend

- (C) Team captain
- (S) Suspended
- (I) Ineligible
- (W) Walk-on
- Injured
- Current redshirt

Roster
Last update: October 20, 2025

== Schedule and results ==
Date time, TV	Rank^{#}	Opponent^{#}	Result	Record	High points	High rebounds	High assists	Site (attendance) city, state
Exhibition
October 17, 2025; 6:00 p.m., B1G+		at No. 7 Michigan	W 100–98	–	15 – Tied	6 – Tied	4 – Tied	Crisler Center (10,166); Ann Arbor, MI
October 24, 2025; 8:00 p.m., SECN+		at No. 14 Arkansas	L 61–89	–	10 – Dzellat	6 – Tied	4 – Harris	Bud Walton Arena (14,832); Fayetteville, AR
Regular season
November 3, 2025; 7:00 p.m., ESPN+		Western Carolina	W 94–63	1–0	18 – Tied	10 – Miller	4 – Kriisa	Fifth Third Arena (9,126); Cincinnati, OH
November 7, 2025; 7:00 p.m., ESPN+		Georgia State	W 74–64	2–0	24 – Miller	10 – Miller	4 – Thomas	Fifth Third Arena (10,009); Cincinnati, OH
November 11, 2025; 7:00 p.m., ESPN+		Dayton; Twyman-Stokes Classic	W 74–62	3–0	20 – Thomas	10 – Miller	8 – Kriisa	Fifth Third Arena (11,815); Cincinnati, OH
November 16, 2025; 6:00 p.m., ESPN+		Mount St. Mary's	W 72–55	4–0	16 – Thomas	11 – Miller	5 – Tied	Fifth Third Arena (9,007); Cincinnati, OH
November 21, 2025; 6:30 p.m., ESPN2		vs. No. 6 Louisville; Rivalry — The Hoops Classic	L 64–74	4–1	12 – Tied	9 – Thiam	5 – Thomas	Heritage Bank Center (8,507); Cincinnati, OH
November 24, 2025; 7:00 p.m., ESPN+		NJIT	W 94–67	5–1	20 – Abaev	10 – Thiam	6 – Kriisa	Fifth Third Arena (8,774); Cincinnati, OH
November 26, 2025; 7:00 p.m., ESPN+		Eastern Michigan	L 56–64	5–2	17 – Thomas	7 – Abaev	6 – Kriisa	Fifth Third Arena (9,853); Cincinnati, OH
December 1, 2025; 7:00 p.m., ESPN+		Tarleton State	W 76–58	6–2	20 – Kriisa	11 – Miller	6 – Thomas	Fifth Third Arena (8,092); Cincinnati, OH
December 5, 2025; 7:30 p.m., TNT		at Xavier; Rivalry/Crosstown Shootout	L 74–79	6–3	16 – Abaev	17 – Miller	6 – Miller	Cintas Center (10,880); Cincinnati, OH
December 13, 2025*; 2:00 p.m., ESPNU		vs. Georgia; Holiday Hoopsgiving	L 65–84	6–4	13 – Celestine	9 – Thiam	4 – Thomas	State Farm Arena; Atlanta, GA
December 17, 2025; 7:00 p.m., ESPN+		Alabama State	W 88–51	7–4	26 – Miller	14 – Miller	7 – Kriisa	Fifth Third Arena (7,757); Cincinnati, OH
December 21, 2025*; 3:00 p.m., ESPN		vs. Clemson; Greenville Winter Invitational	L 65–68	7–5	17 – Thomas	7 – Miller	3 – Tied	Bon Secours Wellness Arena (4,065); Greenville, SC
December 29, 2025; 7:00 p.m., ESPN+		Lipscomb	W 89–62	8–5	18 – Thiam	21 – Miller	7 – Miller	Fifth Third Arena (9,793); Cincinnati, OH
Big 12 regular season
January 3, 2026; 2:00 p.m., FOX		No. 8 Houston	L 60–67	8–6 (0–1)	15 – Thomas	8 – Miller	4 – Tied	Fifth Third Arena (11,062); Cincinnati, OH
January 6, 2026; 7:00 p.m., ESPN2		at West Virginia rivalry	L 60–62	8–7 (0–2)	15 – Celestine	7 – Miller	6 – Miller	WVU Coliseum (9,903); Morgantown, WV
January 11, 2026; 5:00 p.m., ESPN2		at No. 25 UCF	L 72–73	8–8 (0–3)	24 – Thiam	7 – Miller	6 – Harris	Addition Financial Arena (7,899); Orlando, FL
January 14, 2026; 7:00 p.m., Peacock/NBCSN		Colorado	W 77–68	9–8 (1–3)	25 – Miller	11 – Miller	5 – Thomas	Fifth Third Arena (9,331); Cincinnati, OH
January 17, 2026; 2:00 p.m., Peacock/NBCSN		No. 2 Iowa State	W 79–70	10–8 (2–3)	19 – Thomas	12 – Miller	4 – Miller	Fifth Third Arena (10,551); Cincinnati, OH
January 21, 2026; 9:00 p.m., FS1		at No. 1 Arizona	L 51–77	10–9 (2–4)	14 – Miller	6 – Miller	2 – Tied	McKale Center (14,380); Tucson, AZ
January 24, 2026; 10:00 p.m., CBSSN		at Arizona State	L 68–82	10–10 (2–5)	23 – Miller	9 – Miller	6 – Thomas	Desert Financial Arena (6,950); Tempe, AZ
January 28, 2026; 6:30 p.m., FS1		Baylor	W 67–57	11–10 (3–5)	18 – Miller	17 – Miller	4 – Tied	Fifth Third Arena (9,982); Cincinnati, OH
January 31, 2026; 12:00 p.m., FOX		at No. 10 Houston	L 54–76	11–11 (3–6)	15 – Celestine	8 – Miller	4 – Tied	Fertitta Center (7,035); Houston, TX
February 5, 2026; 7:00 p.m., ESPN2		West Virginia rivalry	L 54–59	11–12 (3–7)	18 – James	10 – Celestine	6 – Celestine	Fifth Third Arena (10,215); Cincinnati, OH
February 8, 2026; 2:00 p.m., CBSSN		UCF	W 92–72	12–12 (4–7)	17 – Miller	10 – Miller	5 – Miller	Fifth Third Arena (9,969); Cincinnati, OH
February 11, 2026; 9:00 p.m., CBSSN		at Kansas State	W 91–62	13–12 (5–7)	24 – James	11 – Miller	7 – Thomas	Bramlage Coliseum (7,274); Manhattan, KS
February 15, 2026; 12:00 p.m., ESPN		Utah	W 69–65	14–12 (6–7)	16 – Thomas	10 – Thiam	4 – Tied	Fifth Third Arena (9,988); Cincinnati, OH
February 21, 2026; 1:00 p.m., CBS		at No. 8 Kansas	W 84–68	15–12 (7–7)	28 – Thiam	8 – Tied	8 – Miller	Allen Fieldhouse (15,300); Lawrence, KS
February 24, 2026; 7:00 p.m., ESPN2		at No. 16 Texas Tech	L 68–80	15–13 (7–8)	21 – Thiam	10 – Thiam	4 – Miller	United Supermarkets Arena (13,858); Lubbock, TX
February 28, 2026; 2:00 p.m., CBSSN		Oklahoma State	W 91–68	16–13 (8–8)	26 – Thomas	15 – Thiam	8 – Miller	Fifth Third Arena (9,993); Cincinnati, OH
March 3, 2026; 9:00 p.m., ESPN2		BYU	W 90–68	17–13 (9–8)	18 – Tied	12 – Miller	6 – Tied	Fifth Third Arena (12,012); Cincinnati, OH
March 7, 2026; 2:00 p.m., TNT/TruTV		at TCU	L 63–73	17–14 (9–9)	19 – Thomas	14 – Miller	5 – Harris	Schollmaier Arena (6,260); Fort Worth, TX
Big 12 tournament
March 10, 2026; 3:00 p.m., ESPN+	(9)	vs. (16) Utah; First Round	W 73−66	18–14	19 – Celestine	14 – Miller	6 – Miller	T-Mobile Center (7,238); Kansas City, MO
March 11, 2026; 3:00 p.m., ESPNU	(9)	vs. (8) UCF; Second Round	L 65–66 ^{OT}	18–15	18 – Thiam	16 – Thiam	6 – Thomas	T-Mobile Center (12,477); Kansas City, MO
*Non-conference game. ^{#}Rankings from AP poll. (#) Tournament seedings in parentheses. All times are in Eastern Time.
