= Lolu =

Village in Estonia

- Village
- Location within Estonia
- Coordinates: 58.295833333333°N 25.654166666667°E
- Country: Estonia
- County: Viljandi County
- Parish: Viljandi Parish
- Time zone: UTC+2 (EET)
  - Summer (DST): UTC+3 (EEST)

Lolu is a village in Viljandi Parish, Viljandi County in Estonia. The village has about 49 residents as reported from the 2011 Estonia census, down 2.3% from 64 in the 2000 Estonia census. It was a part of Paistu Parish until 2013.
