= Struuga Landscape Conservation Area =

Protected area in Estonia

- Location within Estonia
- Location: Estonia
- Coordinates: 59°01′N 27°43′E
- Area: 1,251 ha (3,090 acres)
- Established: 2007

Struuga Landscape Conservation Area was a nature park which was located in Ida-Viru County, Estonia.

The area of the nature park was 1251 ha.

The protected area was founded in 2007 to protect the oxbow lakes (Estonian: vanajõgi or Estonian: struuga) of the Narva River, and theirs biodiversity. In 2021, the protected area was incorporated to Alutaguse National Park.
