= Juhan Kunder =

Estonian writer and folklorist (1852–1888)

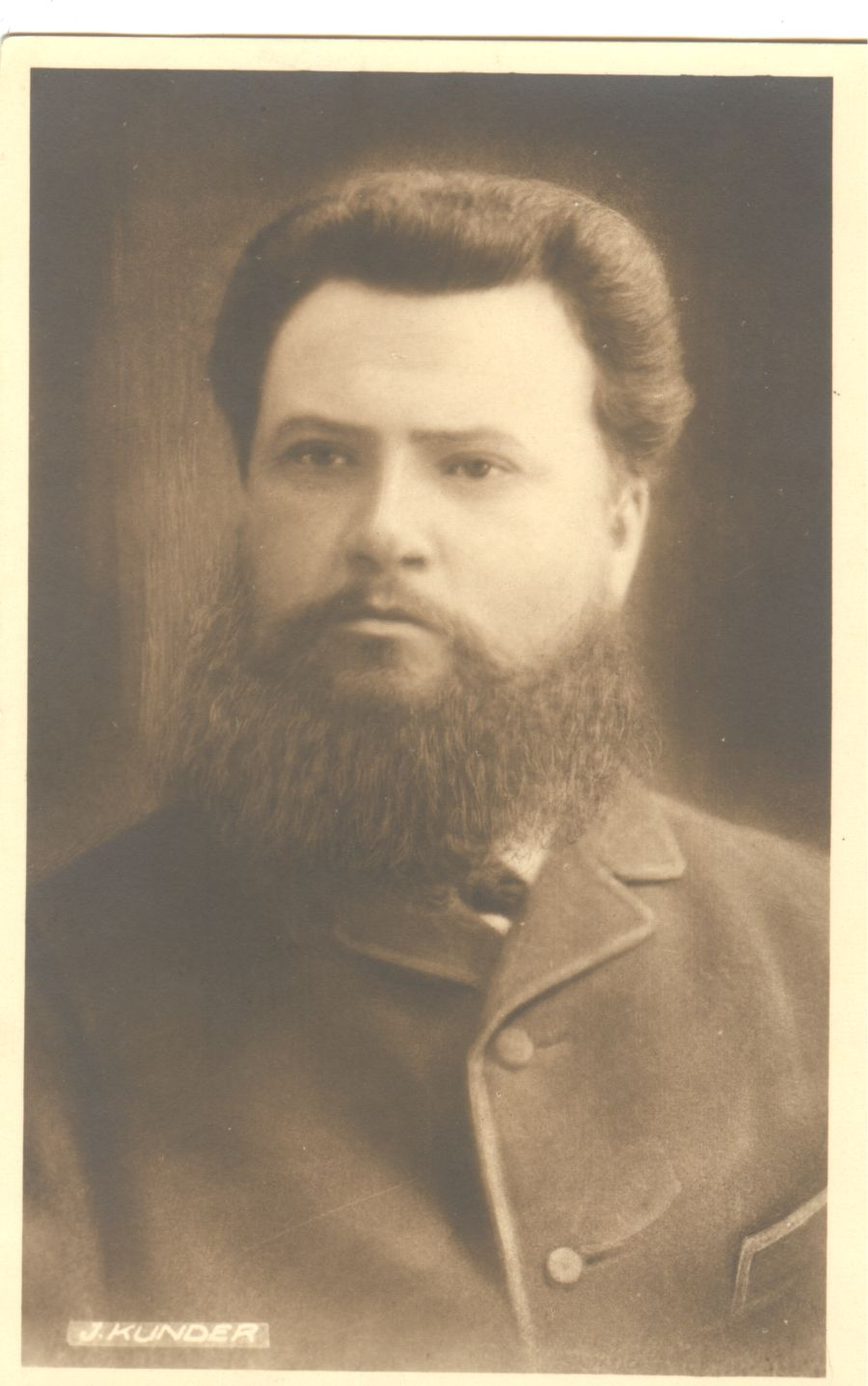
- Juhan Kunder c. 1885
- Born: December 26, 1852; Kovali farm, Pulleritsu, Estonia
- Died: April 24, 1888 (aged 35); Saint Petersburg, Russia
- Occupation: Writer

Juhan Kunder (26 December 1852 – 24 April 1888) was an Estonian poet, playwright, author of natural history textbooks, and folklore collector from the Russian Empire.

From 1872 to 1875 he attended Tartu Teachers' College.

He became a member of the Estonian Students' Society in 1873, and he was a member of the Society of Estonian Literati, serving as its deputy chairman from 1882 to 1888. He was also active in the Alexander School movement.

He wrote for several Estonian newspapers and magazines, including Postimees, Sakala, Valgus, and Meelejahutaja.

He died of typhus in 1888. He is buried at Rakvere Cemetery.

== Selected works ==
- 1873: poetry collection "Õie-kuu ja külm elu maanteel"
- 1884: children's book "Laste raamat"
- poem "Munamäel" ('On Munamägi Mountain')
