= Holstre =

Village in Estonia

- Village
- Location in Estonia
- Coordinates: 58°16′38″N 25°41′35″E
- Country: Estonia
- County: Viljandi County
- Municipality: Viljandi Parish

Population
  - Total: ~220

Holstre is a village in Viljandi Parish, Viljandi County, Estonia. It has a population of about 220. It was a part of Paistu Parish until 2013.

Holstre is the birthplace of Estonian composer Juhan Aavik (1884-1982).
