= Kellavere Landscape Conservation Area =

Nature park in Estonia

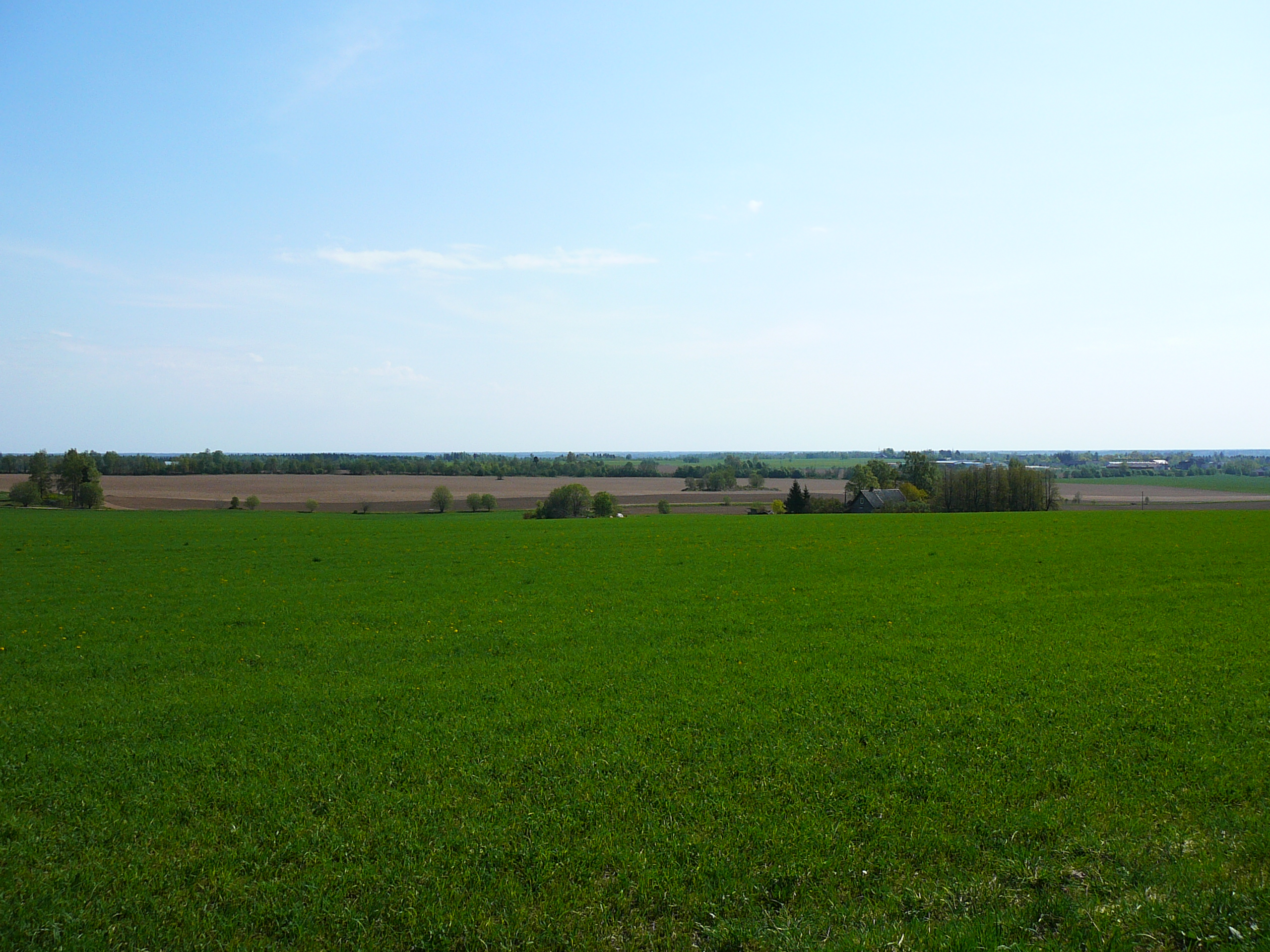

- Location within Estonia
- Location: Estonia
- Coordinates: 59°04′45″N 26°30′50″E
- Area: 155 hectares (380 acres)
- Established: 1959 (2006)

Kellavere Landscape Conservation Area is a nature park in Lääne-Viru County, Estonia.

Its area is 155 hectares (380 acres).

The protected area was designated in 1959 to protect Kellavere Hill and its surrounding areas. In 2006, the protected area was redesigned to the landscape conservation area.
