= Juhan Aavik =

Estonian composer (1884–1982)

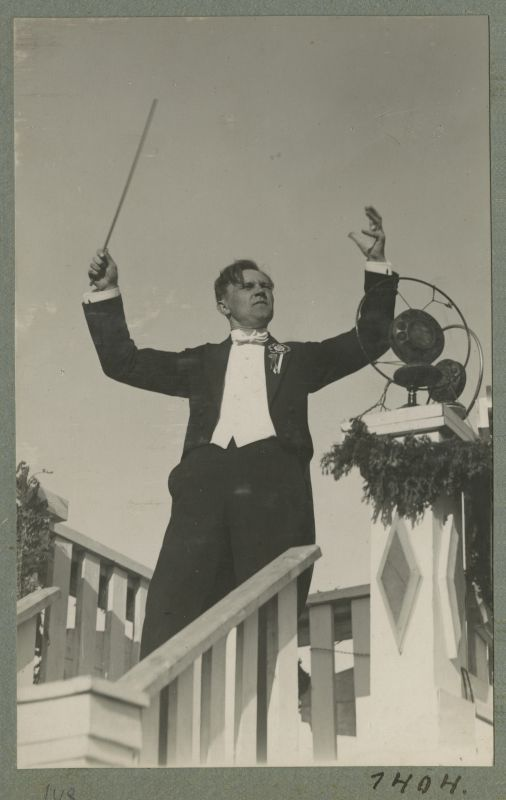
- Aavik at the IX Estonian Song Festival in 1928
- Born: 29 January 1884; Holstre, Kreis Fellin, Governorate of Livonia, Russian Empire
- Died: 26 November 1982 (aged 98); Stockholm, Sweden
- Occupation: Composer

Juhan Aavik (29 January 1884 – 26 November 1982) was an Estonian composer.

== Biography ==
Aavik was born in 1884, in Holstre, Kreis Fellin, Governorate of Livonia, Russian Empire. He studied music composition at the Saint Petersburg Conservatory.

He later served as a conductor in Tartu, Governorate of Livonia (1911–1925), a musical conservatory professor and director in Tallinn (1928–1944), and Estonian song festival director three times (1928, 1933, and 1938).

He escaped from the Russian Army when they invaded Estonia in 1944.

He became an Estonian song festival conductor in Sweden (1948–1961) (after arriving there in 1944).

He wrote nearly 200 Opus numbers, among them two symphonies; a Cello concerto (1949); a Double bass Concerto (1950); a Piano trio (1957); a Requiem (1959); and various choral works, songs and chamber music. In Stockholm at age 81 (1965–1969), he published a history of Estonian music in four volumes.

He died in Stockholm.
