= Paistu Parish =

Former municipality of Estonia

Coordinates: 58°16′13″N 25°37′32″E

Paistu Parish Paistu vald
- Former municipality of Estonia
- Flag Coat of arms

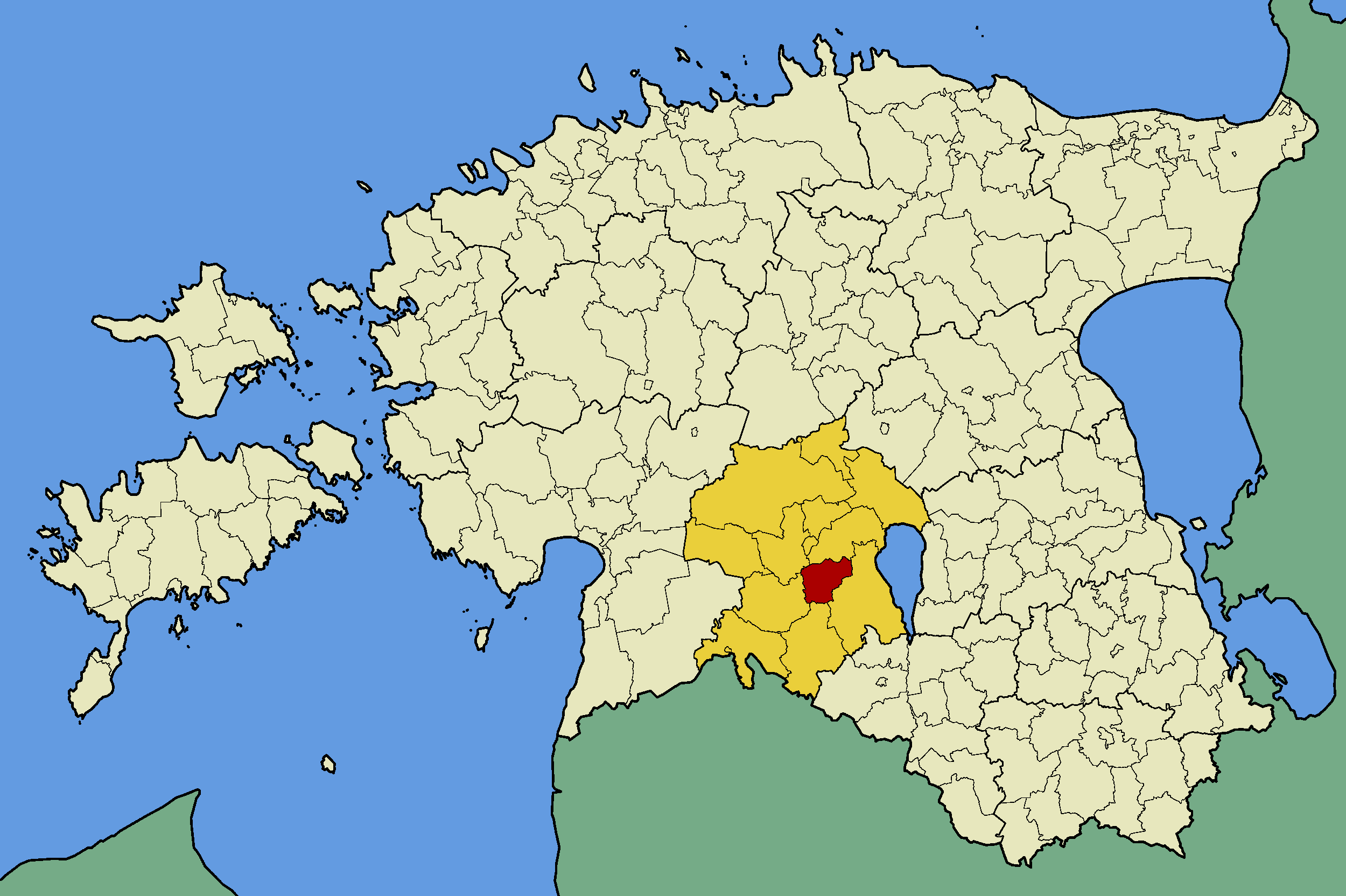
- Paistu Parish within Viljandi County in 2009.
- Country: Estonia
- County: Viljandi County
- Administrative centre: Paistu

Area
  - Total: 128.59 km^{2} (49.65 sq mi)

Population (01.01.2009)
  - Total: 1,622
  - Density: 12.61/km^{2} (32.67/sq mi)
- Website: www.paistu.ee

Paistu Parish (Estonian: Paistu vald) was a rural municipality of Estonia, in Viljandi County.

After the local government council elections held on 20 October 2013, Paistu Parish was merged with Pärsti, Saarepeedi and Viiratsi parishes to form a new Viljandi Parish around the town of Viljandi.

On 1 January 2009, it had a population of 1,622 and an area of 128.59 km^{2}.

== Settlements ==
Villages

Aidu - Hendrikumõisa - Holstre - Intsu - Kassi - Lolu - Loodi - Luiga - Mustapali - Paistu - Pirmastu - Pulleritsu - Rebase - Sultsi - Tömbi - Viisuküla

== Notable people ==
- Ernst Reinhold von Hofmann, geologist and mineralogist
