= List of mountains in Estonia =

List of hills in Estonia.

Name	Height (m)	Location (county, parish)	Notes	Coordinates
Suur Munamägi	318	Võru County, Võru Parish	The highest in Estonia and also in Baltic states	57°42'50.562"N, 27°3'36.169"E
Vällamägi	304	Võru County, Rõuge Parish	The second highest in Estonia	
Kuutsemägi	217	Valga County, Otepää Parish		
Meegaste	214	Valga County		
Harimägi	212	Valga County		
Väike Munamägi	207.5	Valga County		
Emumägi	166.5	Lääne-Viru County		58°56'15.18"N, 26°22'26.71"E
Härjassaare Hill	147	Viljandi County	The highest hill in Sakala Upland	
Ebavere Hill	146	Lääne-Viru County		
Tornimägi	137	Valga County	The highest hill in Karula Upland	
Tornimägi	68	Hiiu County		
Ristimägi		Hiiu County	Small positive landform. One of the most notable place in Hiiumaa	
Rauna Hill		Saare County	Saaremaa’s highest place	
Kellavere Hill		Lääne-Viru County, Vinni Parish	Part of Kellavere Landscape Conservation Area	

== See also ==
- List of mountains in Europe
