= Viisuküla =

Village in Estonia

- Village
- Location within Estonia
- Coordinates: 58.29°N 25.677222222222°E
- Country: Estonia
- County: Viljandi County
- Parish: Viljandi Parish
- Time zone: UTC+2 (EET)
  - Summer (DST): UTC+3 (EEST)

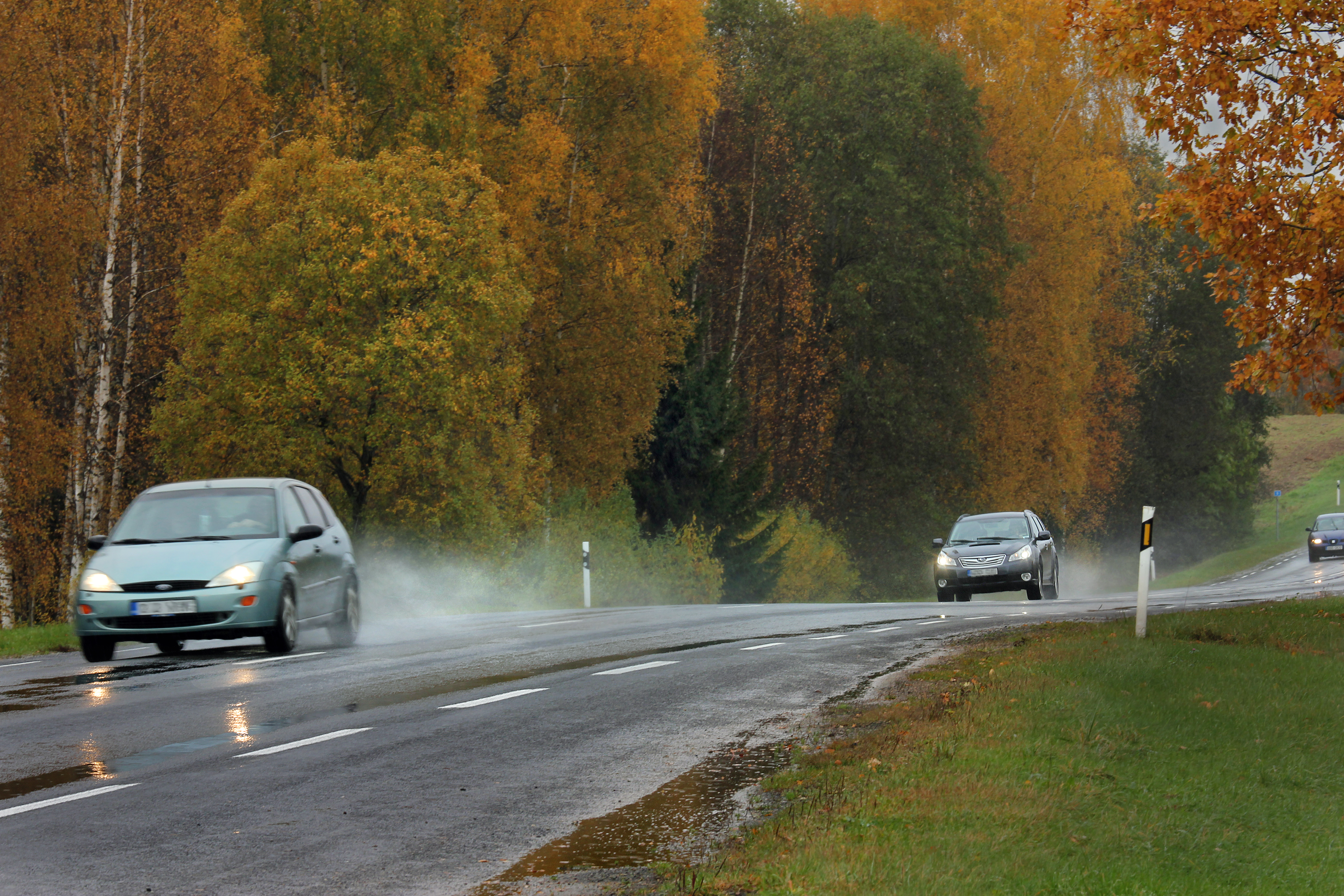
Viljandi-Rõngu road in Viisuküla

Viisuküla is a village in Viljandi Parish, Viljandi County in Estonia. It was a part of Paistu Parish until 2013.
