= Õisu Manor =

Manor house in Estonia

- Manor house
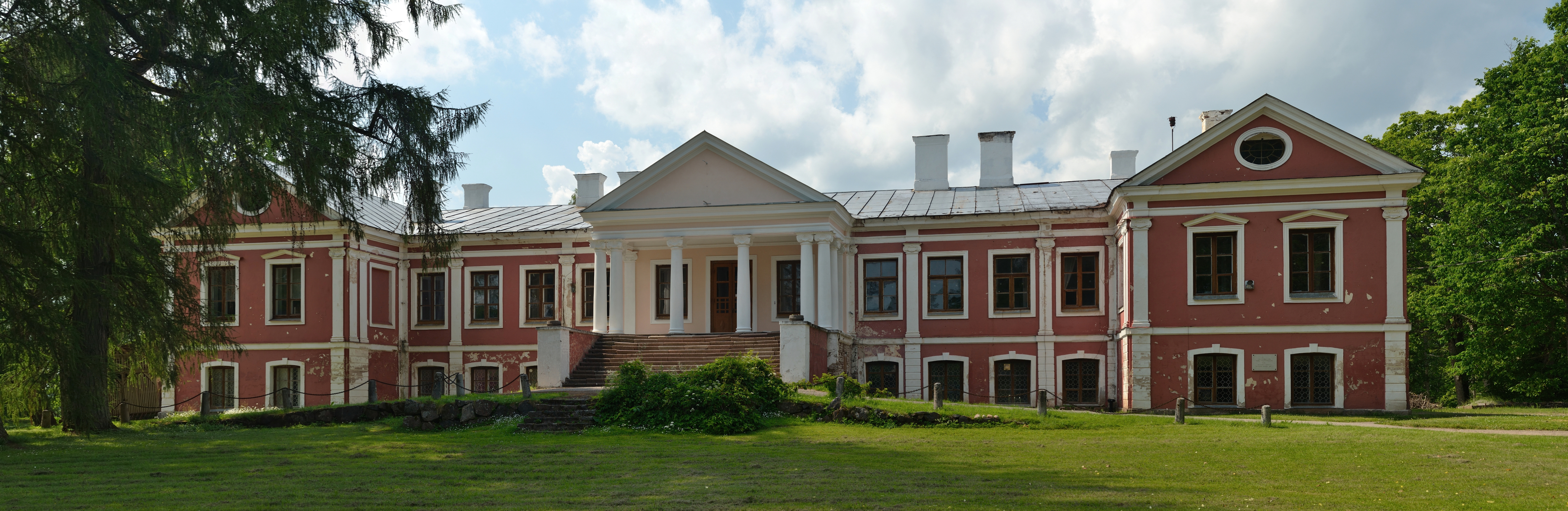
- Main building of Õisu Manor

- Location in Estonia
- Coordinates: 58°6′43″N 25°29′19″E
- Country: Estonia
- County: Viljandi County
- Parish: Mulgi Parish

Õisu Manor is a historic manor house located in Mulgi Parish, Viljandi County, Estonia.

== History ==
The estate dates back to the late 18th century and has historically been associated with the von Sievers noble family.
