= Jizzle James =

American basketball player (born 2004)

Personal information
- Born: December 25, 2004 (age 21)
- Listed height: 6 ft 3 in (1.91 m)
- Listed weight: 205 lb (93 kg)

Career information
- High school: Olympia (Orlando, Florida)
- College: Cincinnati (2023–2026); Charlotte (2026)
- Position: Point guard

Jizzle James Jr. (born December 25, 2004) is an American college basketball player. He previously played for the Charlotte 49ers and the Cincinnati Bearcats.

== Early life and high school ==
As a junior at Olympia High School, James averaged 25.4 points per game. Ranked as a four-star recruit and the 10th overall point guard in the class of 2023, he committed to play college basketball for the Cincinnati Bearcats over offers from schools such as Indiana, Miami, and USC.

== College career ==
In the first round of the 2024 National Invitation Tournament, James made his first career start, where he scored 25 points in a victory over Bradley. As freshman in 2023–24, he appeared in 37 games with two starts, where he averaged 8.8 points and 2.1 rebounds per game. On February 11, 2025, James notched 25 points and six assists in a win over Utah.

On August 19, 2025, Cincinnati head coach Wes Miller announced that James was no longer a part of the program, and had been removed from the team in July. On December 17, it was announced that James had been added back to the Cincinnati Bearcats' active roster. He averaged 10.9 points per game and shot 44% from behind the arc. At the end of the 2025–26 season, James entered the transfer portal.

On April 13, 2026, James announced his intentions to transfer to Charlotte.

On September 8, 2026, James was removed from the Charlotte roster. Reports later indicated that this was due to a substance abuse issue.

== Personal life ==
James is the son of NFL Hall of Fame running back Edgerrin James.
