= Karula Upland =

Upland in Estonia

Coordinates: 57°42′52″N 26°29′12″E

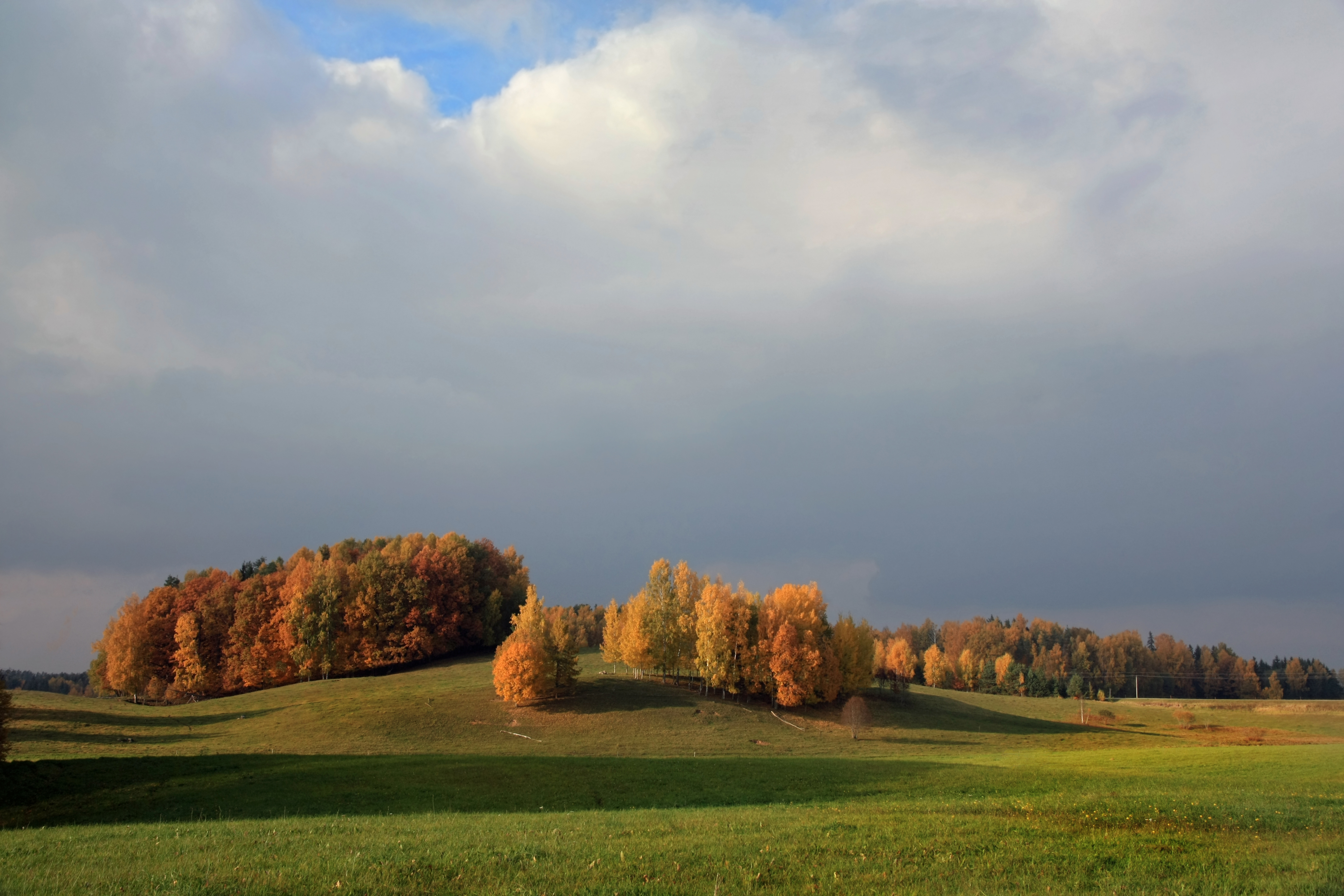
Karula Upland

Karula Upland (Estonian: Karula kõrgustik) is hilly area of higher elevation in Southern Estonia.

Upland's area is about 350 square kilometres (140 sq mi).

The highest point of upland is Tornimägi (137 m).
