= List of landscape units of Estonia =

This is the list of landscape units located in Estonia. The list is incomplete.

Name	Name in Estonian	Location (Western, Northern, Eastern, Southern Estonia)	Further info
Alutaguse Lowland	Alutaguse madalik	Eastern Estonia	
Baltic Syncline	Balti sünekliis	Western Estonia (encompasses many countries)	
Haanja Upland	Haanja kõrgustik	Southern Estonia	
Karula Upland	Karula kõrgustik		
Otepää Upland	Otepää kõrgustik		
Tilleorg Valley	Tilleorg	Southern Estonia	Põlva County, Põlva Parish
Vooremaa	Vooremaa		
