= Alutaguse National Park =

Protected area in Estonia

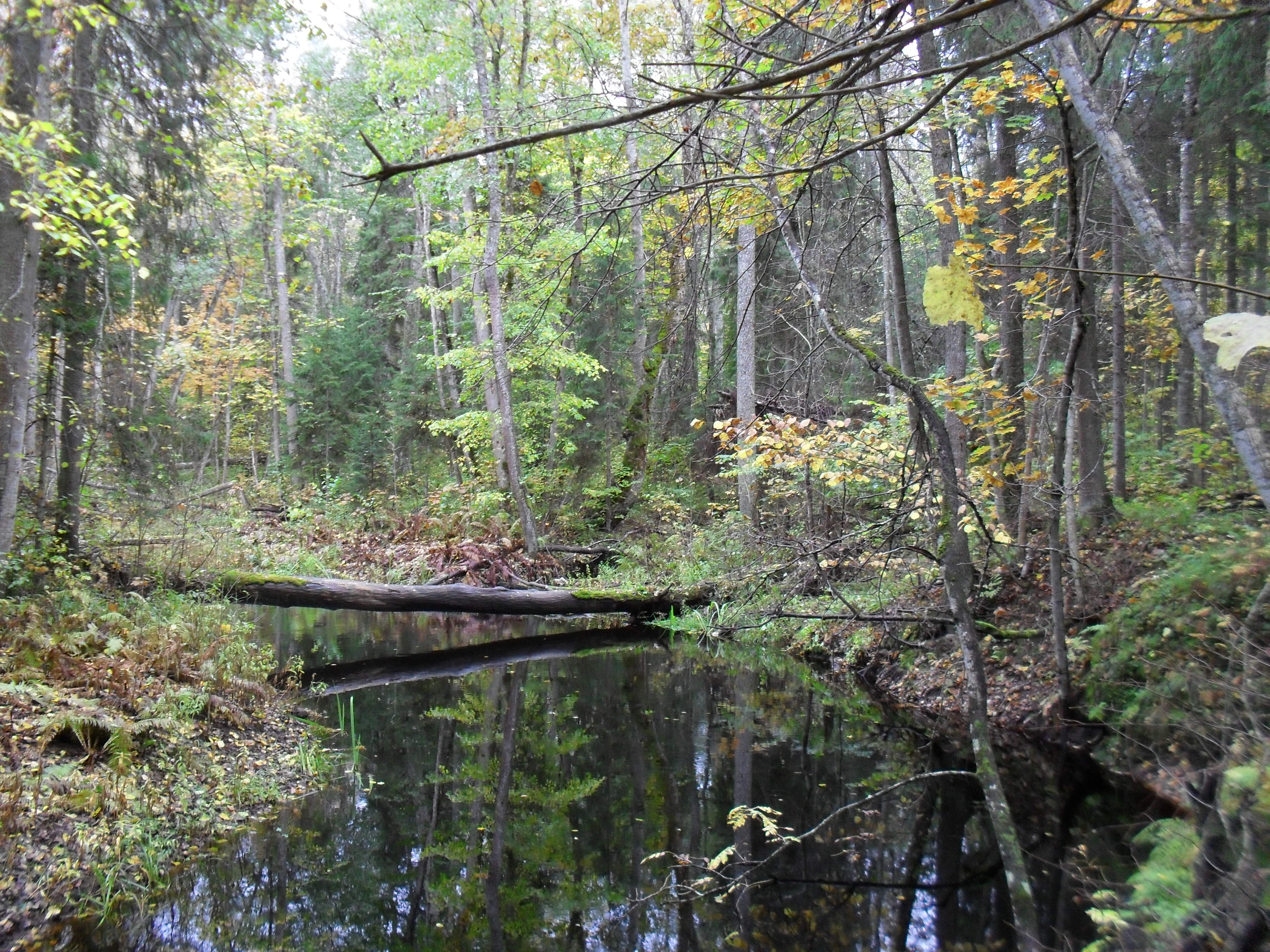

- Location within Estonia
- Location: Estonia
- Coordinates: 59°06′N 27°19′E
- Area: 443.31 km^{2} (171.16 sq mi)
- Established: 2018

Alutaguse National Park (Estonian: Alutaguse rahvuspark) is a national park in eastern Estonia, established in 2018.

The park lies mostly on the Alutaguse Lowland. This region is characterized by sparse settlement density and a high percentage of natural landscapes. Roughly 54% of the park consists of bogs, and 42% is forested.

The many rare species in the park include Siberian flying squirrel, willow ptarmigan and black stork.

== See also ==
- Protected areas of Estonia
- List of national parks in the Baltics
