= Loodi Landscape Conservation Area =

Protected area in Estonia

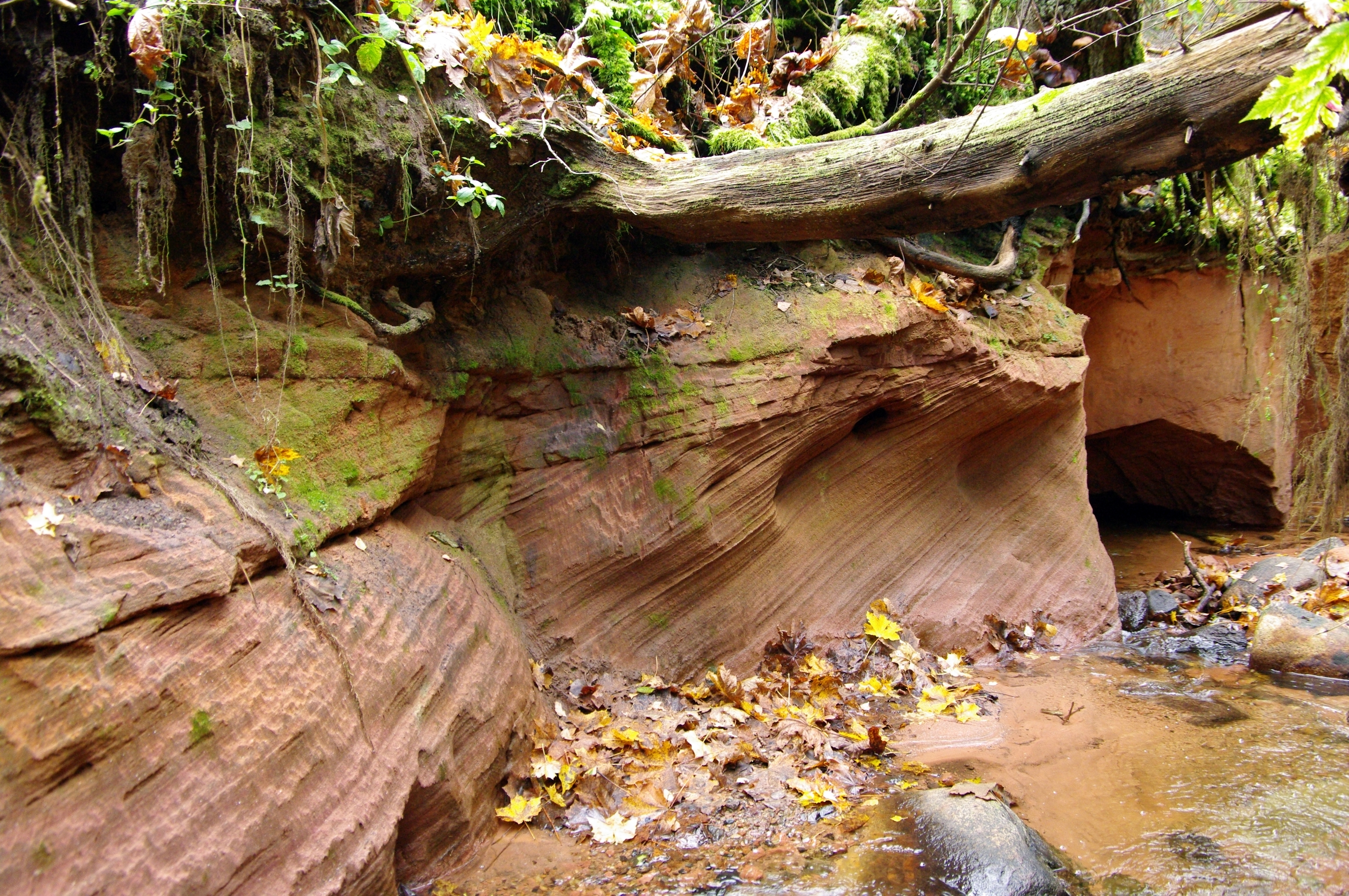

- Location within Estonia
- Location: Estonia
- Coordinates: 58°17′30″N 25°38′30″E
- Area: 3,485 ha (8,610 acres)
- Established: 1992 (2006)

Loodi Landscape Conservation Area is a nature park situated in Viljandi County, Estonia.

Its area is 3485 ha.

The protected area was designated in 1992 to protect landscapes and nature of Viljandi Parish. In 2006, the protected area was redesigned to the landscape conservation area.

== Description ==
The nature park was established to protect a naturally diverse landscape, balancing areas, and the habitats and growing sites of rare species. The nature park features a variety of natural and heritage cultural landscapes, growing sites and habitats of rare and endangered species, and protected individual natural objects such as ancient trees, erratic boulders, and outcrops. The Siniallikas (Blue Spring), located near the Sinialliku hill fort, is also known as a sacrificial spring (Sinialliku allikad), Sinialliku lake and Sinialliku hill fort; at the northern end of Sinialliku lake grows the Sinialliku [Swiss pine] (girth 240 cm), and near the settlement of Ramsi stands the Rahetsema pine (girth 328 cm). Other sights include the [[Loodi Püstmäe European larch stand]], the Paistu primeval valley (the valley contains numerous sandstone outcrops, the largest of which, 15 m high and 23 m wide, is known as "Loodi Hell"), the Polli hills (with an interesting and varied relief, with relative heights of up to 35 m), the Polli oak (girth 626 cm), Kindralimägi on the shore of Lake Mustjärv in Holstre (the last owner of Holstre manor, General von Berg, is buried on this hill), the Tilli juniper stand, the Nõmme sandy heath (an undulating plain mostly covered with pine forest) and Heimtali park]. Protected plant species growing in the nature park include: great yellow rattle, common twayblade, lesser butterfly-orchid, pale-flowered orchid, green-winged orchid, and heath spotted-orchid. Breeding bird species include: black woodpecker, three-toed woodpecker, and grey-headed woodpecker. Other protected animal species: moor frog.
