= Viljandi County =

County of Estonia

Coordinates: 58°20′N 25°35′E

Viljandi County Viljandimaa
- County
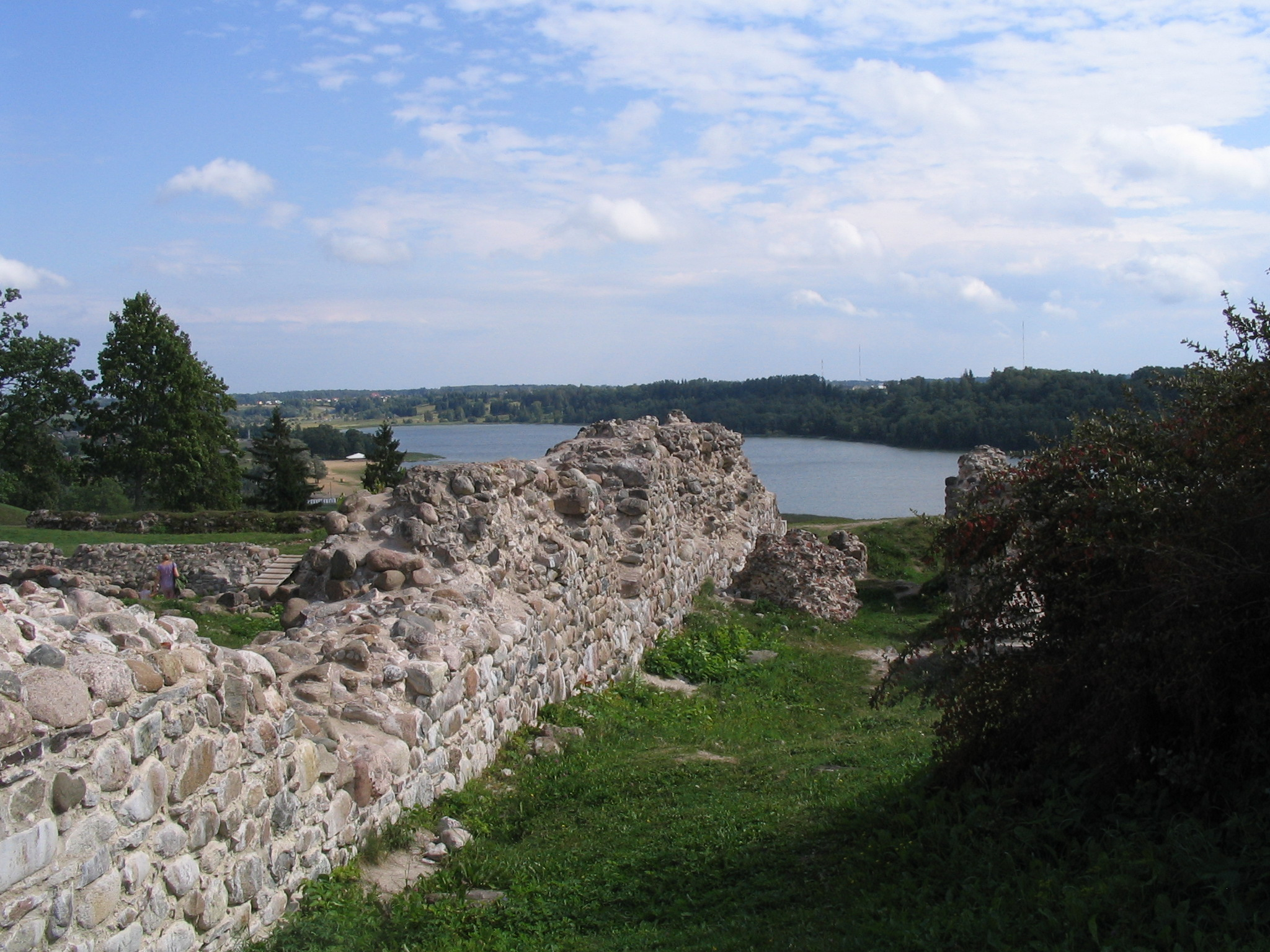

- Flag Coat of arms

- Country: Estonia
- Capital: Viljandi

Area
  - Total: 3,422.49 km^{2} (1,321.43 sq mi)

Population (2022)
  - Total: 45,411
  - Rank: 6th
  - Density: 13.268/km^{2} (34.365/sq mi)

Ethnicity
  - Estonians: 95.5%
  - Russians: 2.4%
  - other: 2.9%

GDP
  - Total: €896 million (2022)
  - Per capita: €19,692 (2022)
- ISO 3166 code: EE-84
- Vehicle registration: D

Viljandi County (Estonian: Viljandi maakond or Viljandimaa; German: Kreis Fellin) is one of 15 counties of Estonia. It is located in southern Estonia bordering Pärnu, Järva, Jõgeva, Tartu and Valga counties as well as Latvia.

== History ==
Viljandimaa, later under the German name Kreis Fellin, was an important centre of commerce and power in the Middle Ages. Today, there are numerous castle ruins there dating from that time.

=== County government ===
Viljandi's county government (Estonian: maavalitsus) had been led by a governor (Estonian: maavanem), who used to be appointed by the government of Estonia for a term of five years. Jüri Ratas's first cabinet decided to abolish the institution, which went into effect in 2018. Lembit Kruuse was the final governor to serve the role.

== Nature ==
A large part of Viljandi County is covered by the low Sakala Upland (highest point 147 m), only a small part of the upland in the southeast and the southwest extends outside the county borders. The parallel name Sakala is also used for the county. Viljandi County also includes most of the Võrtsjärv Lowland (in the east) and in the north, a small part of the Central Estonian Plateau extends into the area of Viljandi County.

Soomaa National Park is located partially within Viljandi County, Estonia; Soomaa mans 'land of bogs'. It protects 390 km^{2} and is a Ramsar site of protected wetlands. The park was created in 1993.

The county includes also Loodi Landscape Conservation Area and several other protected areas.

== Municipalities ==
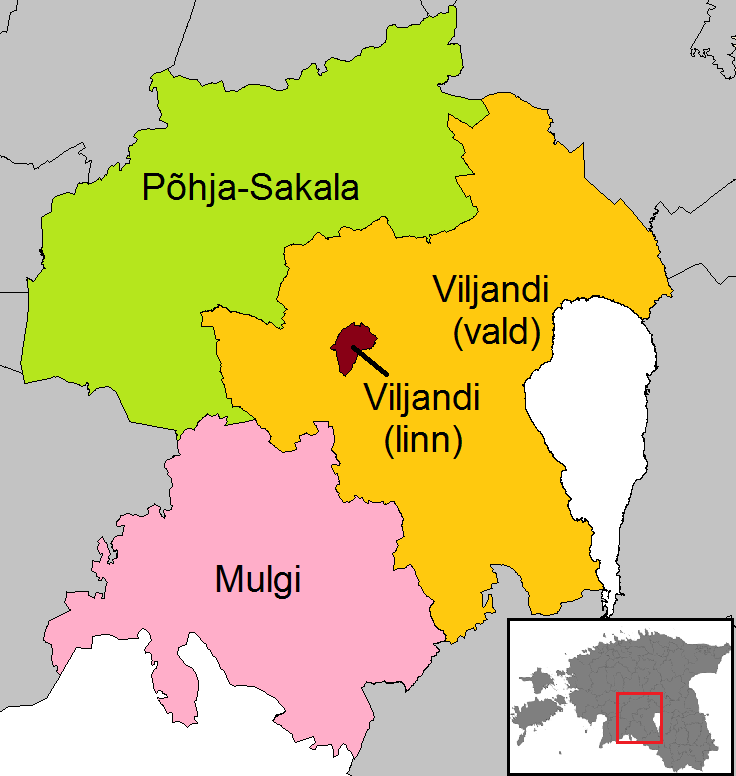
Municipalities of Viljandi County

The county is subdivided into municipalities. There is one urban municipality (Estonian: linnad – towns) and three rural municipalities (Estonian: vallad – parishes) in Viljandi County.

Rank	Municipality	Type	Population (2018)	Area km^{2}	Density
1	Mulgi Parish	Rural	7,652	881	8.7
2	Põhja-Sakala Parish	Rural	8,203	1,153	7.1
3	Viljandi Parish	Rural	13,950	1,374	10.2
4	Viljandi	Urban	17,758	15	1,183.9

== Religion ==
The largest number of congregations in the county are of the Estonian Evangelical Lutheran Church.

Orthodox congregations in the county are predominantly under the jurisdiction of the Estonian Apostolic Orthodox Church.

Several congregations of Baptists and other Christian churches operate in the county.

Religious affiliations in Viljandi County, census 2000–2021*
Religion	2000		2011		2021	
Religion	Number	%	Number	%	Number	%
Christianity	8,859	19.1	5,823	14.3	5,040	13.0
—Orthodox Christians	1,121	2.4	964	2.3	930	2.4
—Lutherans	7,178	15.5	4,373	10.7	3,390	8.8
—Catholics	104	0.2	37	0.09	60	0.1
—Baptists	130	0.2	95	0.2	210	0.5
—Jehovah's Witnesses	119	0.2	134	0.3	110	0.2
—Pentecostals	88	0.1	60	0.1	110	0.2
—Old Believers	1	0.002	5	0.01	-	-
—Methodists	117	0.2	2	0.004	-	-
—Adventists	1	0.002	69	0.1	60	0.1
—Other Christians	-	-	84	0.2	170	0.4
Islam	8	0.01	9	0.01	130	0.3
Buddhism	-	-	45	0.1	20	0.05
Other religions**	216	0.4	346	0.9	410	1.0
No religion	21,757	47.0	29,733	73.2	28,980	74.4
Not stated***	8,105	17.5	4,623	11.4	3,930	10.2
Total population*	46,243		40,579		38,530	
*The censuses of Estonia count the religious affiliations of the population older than 15 years of age. ".

== Gallery ==
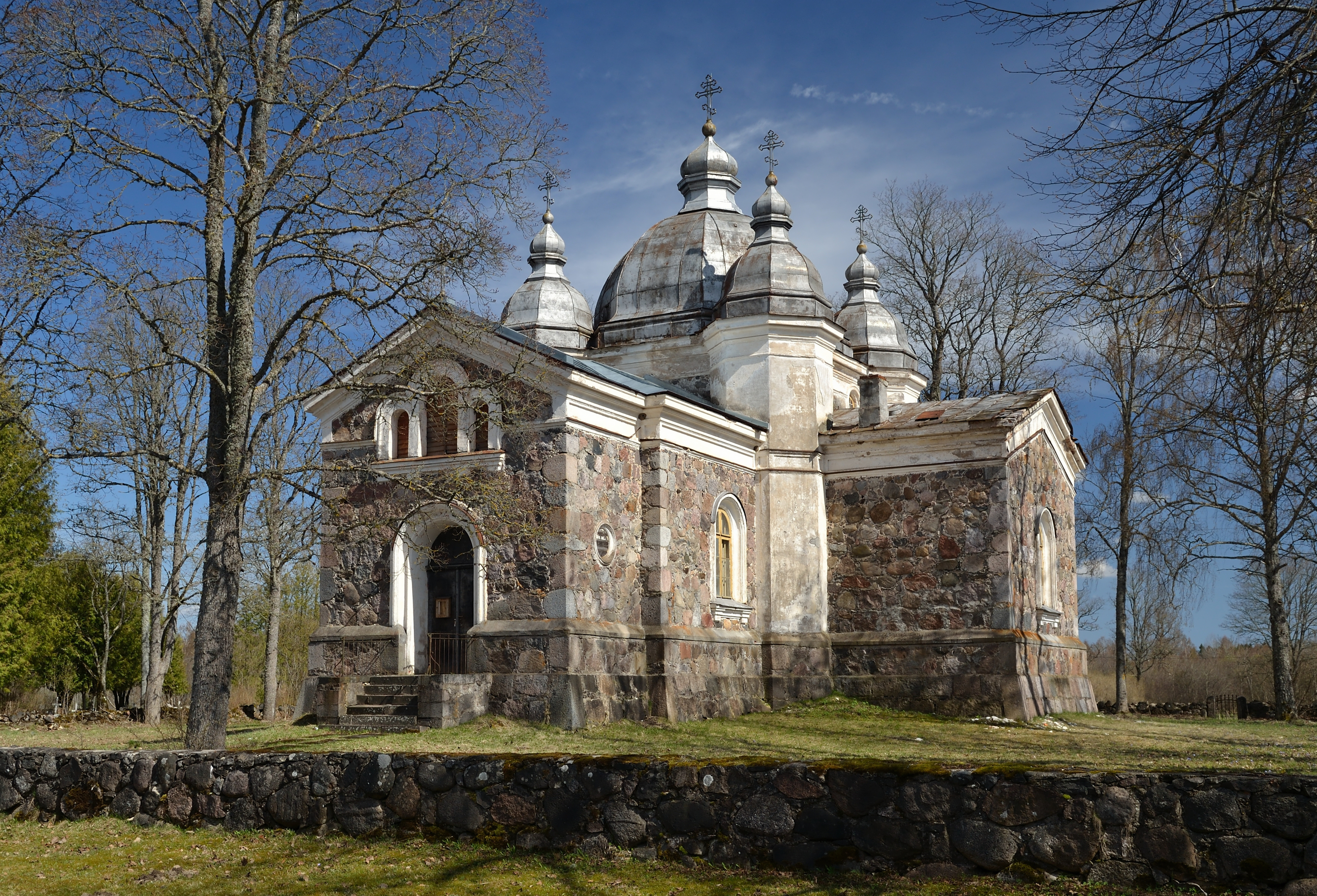
Arussaare orthodox church, built in 1873

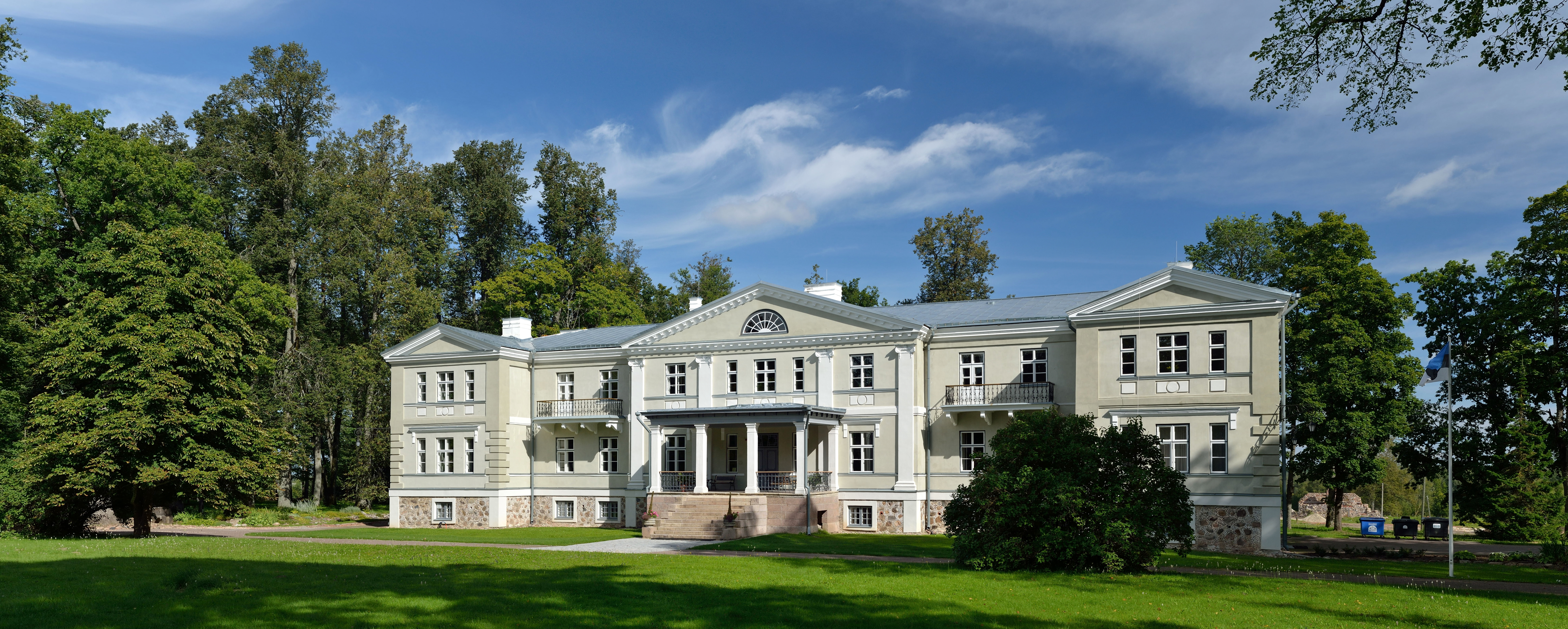
Suure-Kõpu manor main building

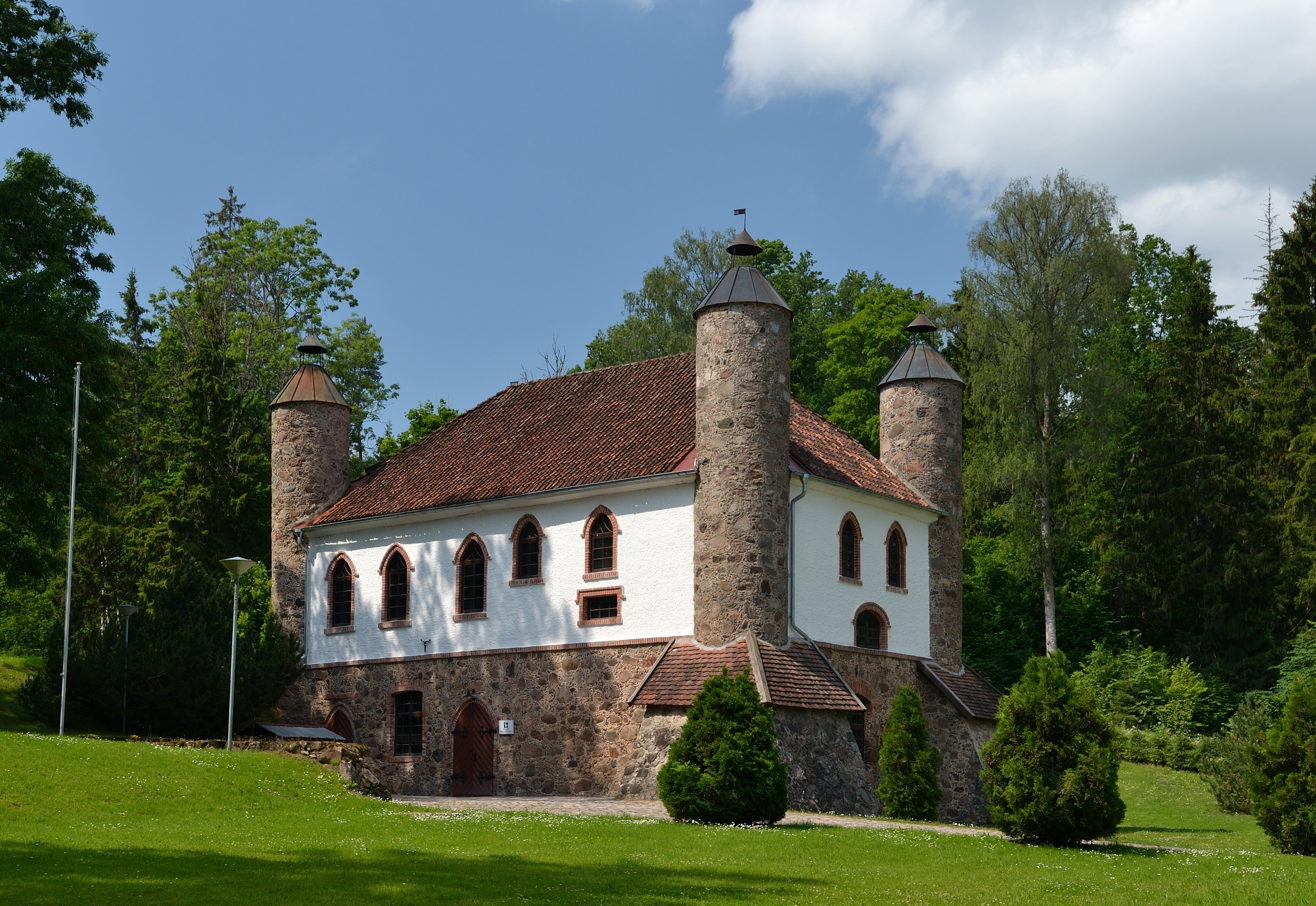
Heimtali manor distillery kitchen

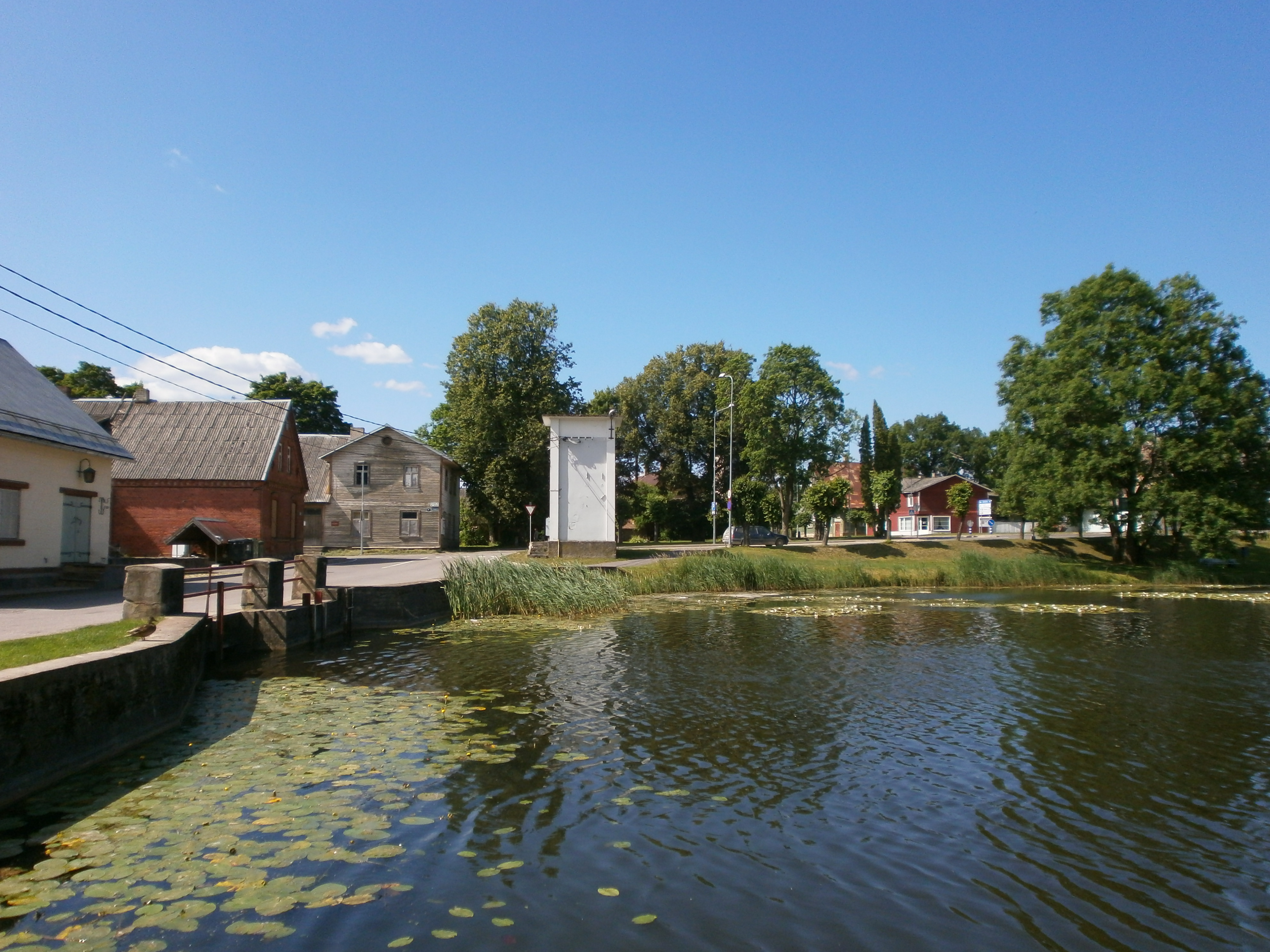
Reservoir in the town of Suure-Jaani

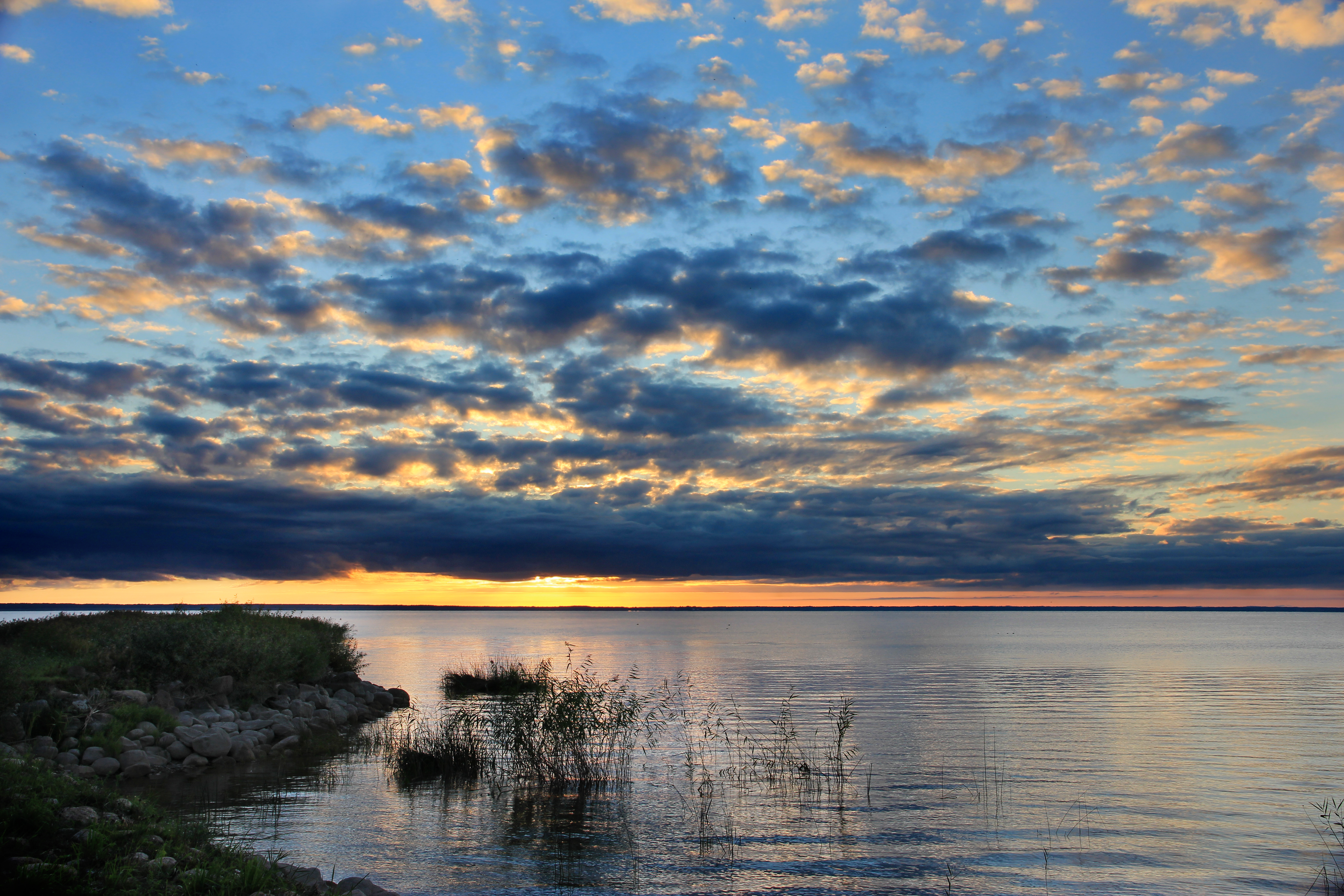
Võrtsjärv lake; view from the village of Valma

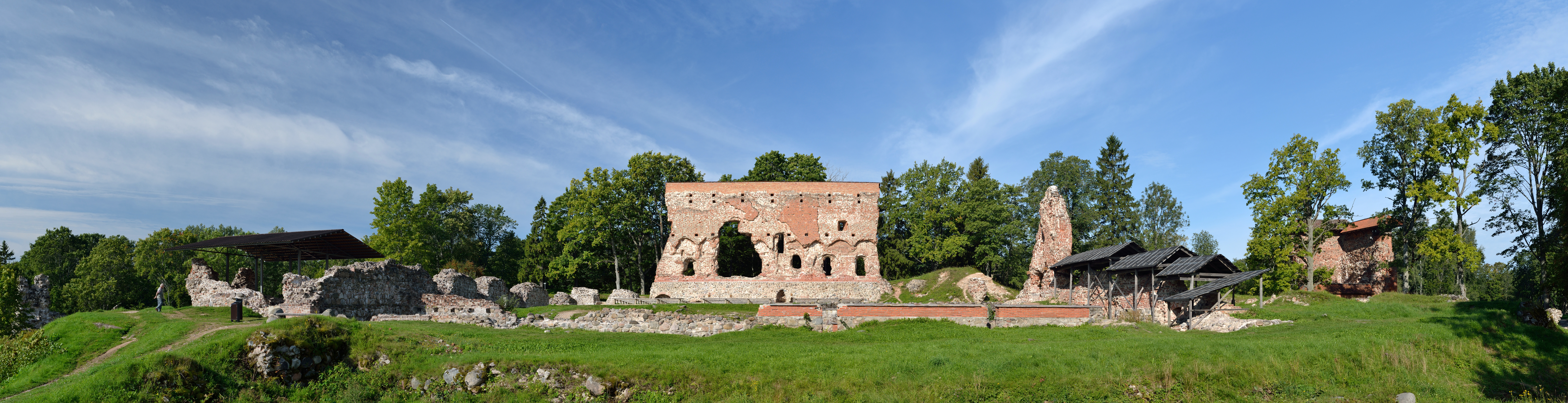
Ruins of Viljandi castle

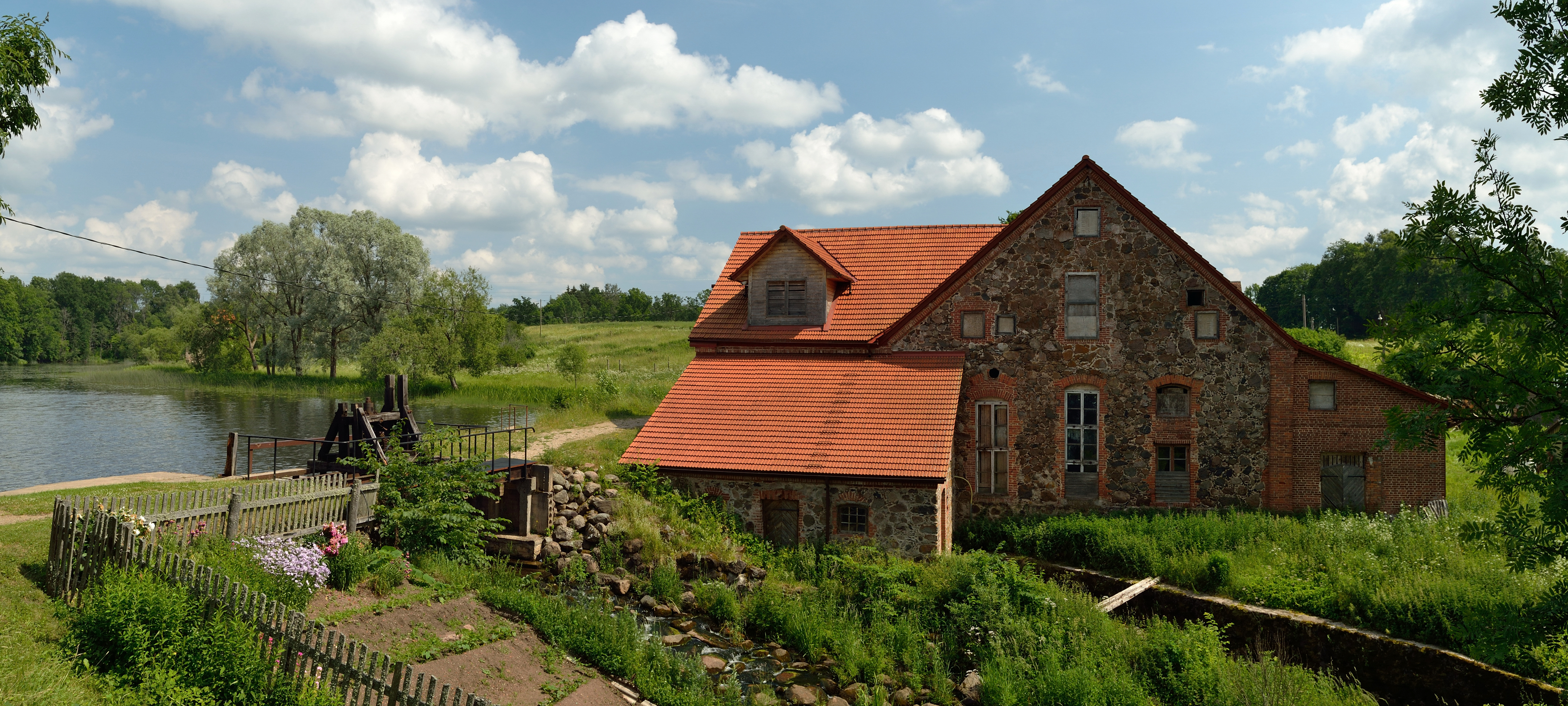
Õisu manor watermill

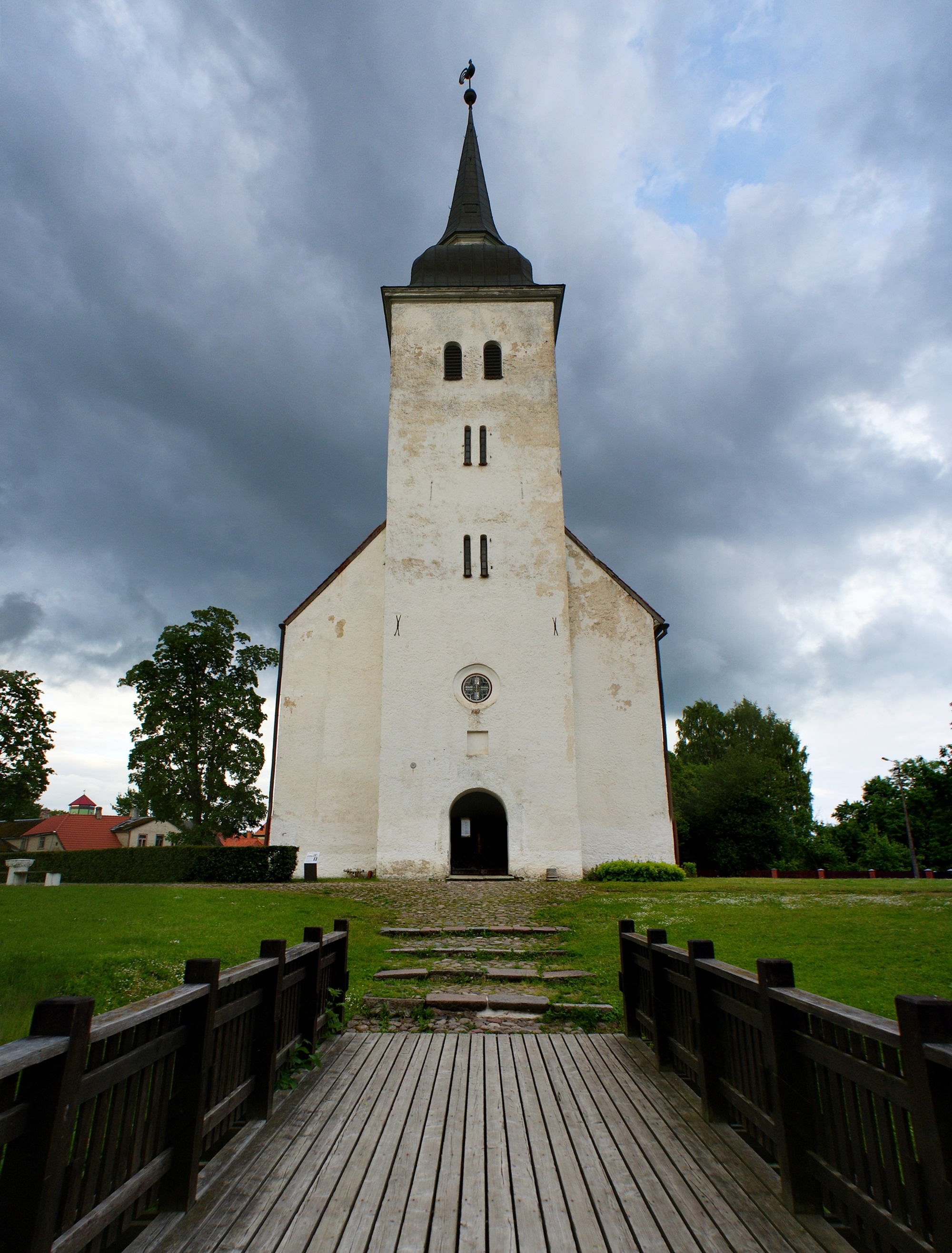
St. John's Church in Viljandi
