= Ants Soots =

Estonian conductor (1956–2025)

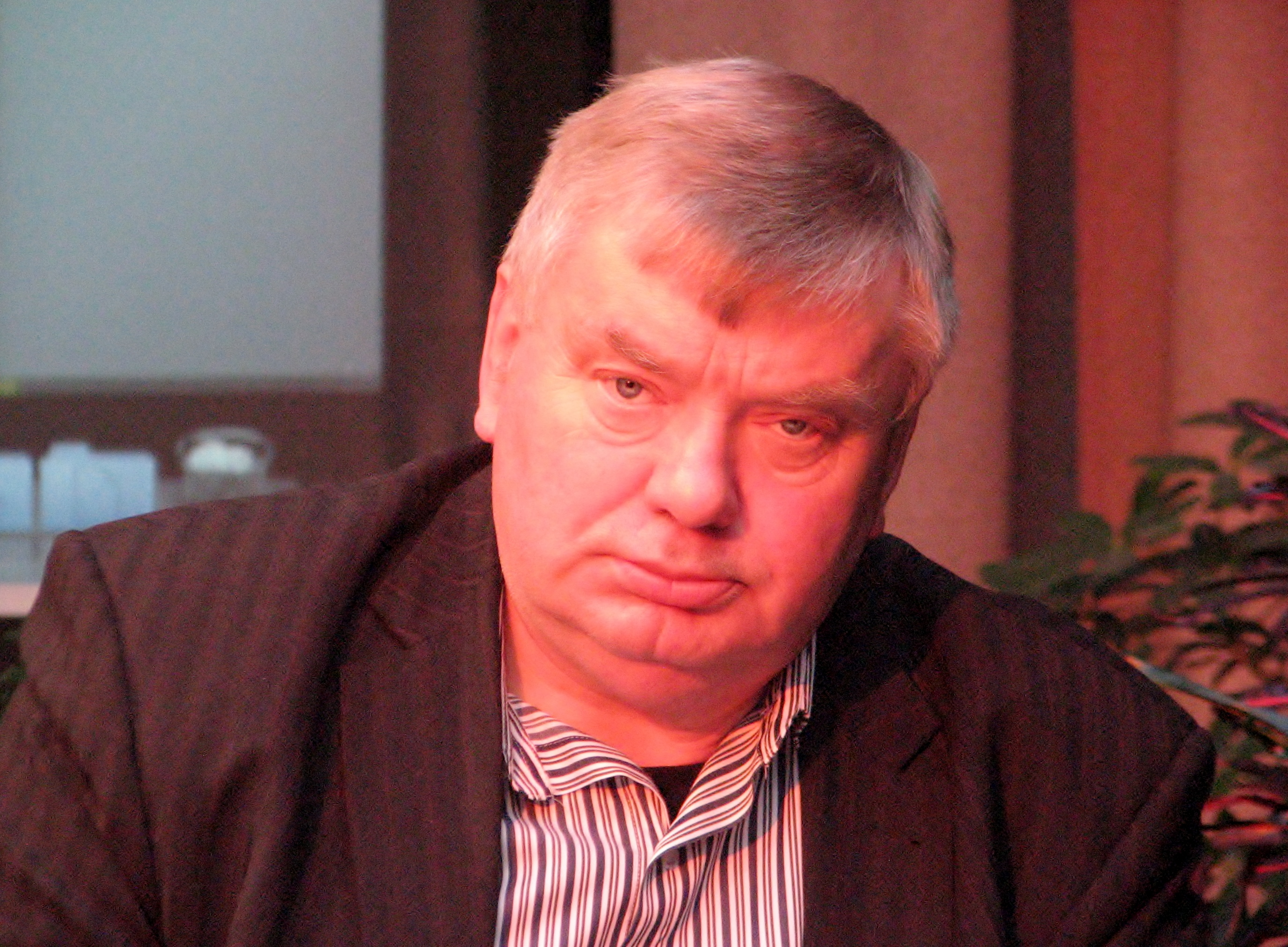
Ants Soots

Ants Soots (19 February 1956 – 27 December 2025) was an Estonian conductor.

== Life and career ==
Soots was born in Rõngu on 19 February 1956. In 1983 he graduated from Tallinn State Conservatory.

From 1982 to 1990 he was a singer of Mixed Choir of Eesti Televisioon and Eesti Raadio.

He directed the following choirs: Forestalia (1976–1991), Academic Male Choir of Tallinn University of Technology (1981–1986), Male Choir of the Estonian Academy of Sciences (1986–1991), Female Choir of the Estonian Academy of Sciences (1990–1991) and Estonian National Male Choir (1991–2005). He worked as a lecturer at the Estonian Academy of Music since 1988, and as a professor since 2004.

== Death ==
Soots died on 27 December 2025, at the age of 69.

== Awards ==
- 2003: Order of the White Star, V class.
- 2004: Grammy Award for Best Choral Performance. Paavo Järvi (conductor), Tiia-Ester Loitme and Ants Soots (chorus masters) for Sibelius: Cantatas performed by the Ellerhein Girls' Choir, the Estonian National Male Choir and the Estonian National Symphony Orchestra.
