= Jõksi =

Jõksi may refer to:

- Jõksi, Põlva County, village in Estonia
- Jõksi, Võru County, village in Estonia
- Lake Jõksi
