= Laiksaare Nature Reserve =

Protected area in Estonia

- Location within Estonia
- Location: Estonia
- Coordinates: 58°06′N 24°38′E
- Area: 401 ha (990 acres)
- Established: 2006

Laiksaare Nature Reserve is a nature reserve which is located in Pärnu County, Estonia.

The area of the nature reserve is 401 ha.

The protected area was founded in 2006 to protect valuable habitat types and threatened species in Nepste village (in former Häädemeeste Parish) and in Laiksaare village (in former Saarde Parish).
