= Murdmaa =

Murdmaa is an Estonian surname. Notable people with the surname include:

- Allan Murdmaa (1934–2009), Estonian architect
- Enn Murdmaa (1874–1957), Estonian politician
- Mai Murdmaa (1938–2026), Estonian choreographer, ballet dancer and director
