= Jaan Pakk =

Jaan Pakk may refer to:

- Jaan Pakk (politician) (1877–1948), Estonian politician, a member of Estonian Constituent Assembly
- Jaan Pakk (conductor) (1901–1979), Estonian conductor
