= Jõgisalu =

Family name

Origin
- Language: Estonian
- Meaning: "river grove"
- Region of origin: Estonia

Jõgisalu is an Estonian surname meaning "river grove"; a compound of jõgi (river) and salu (grove, coppice). The surname Jõgisalu is most commonly found in Lääne County, where 9.17 per 10,000 inhabitants of the county bear the surname.

Notable people bearing the surname Jõgisalu include:

- Harri Jõgisalu (1922–2014), Estonian children's writer
- Revo Jõgisalu (1976–2011), Estonian rapper
