= List of members of the Supreme Soviet of the Estonian Soviet Socialist Republic, 1967–1971 =

This is a list of members of the seventh legislature of the Supreme Soviet of the Estonian Soviet Socialist Republic which was the Estonian Soviet Socialist Republic's legislative chamber between 1940 and 1941, and between 1944 and 1992. The session ran from 19 March 1967 to 13 June 1971, and followed the 1967 Estonian Supreme Soviet election in which only Bloc of Communists and Non-Party Candidates was the only party able to contest the elections.

== List of members ==
Source: Jaan Toomla, Valitud ja Valitsenud: Eesti parlamentaarsete ja muude esinduskogude ning valitsuste isikkoosseis aastail 1917–1999 (National Library of Estonia, 1999), pp. 99–102.

Name	Party	Notes
Agu Aarna	NLKP	
Ilvi Aasma		
Joann Adramees		
Elle-Milvi Afanasjeva	NLKP	
Elmar Aksli		
Roman Aiand	NLKP	
Nikolai Alumäe		
Johannes Anderson		
Valter Ani	NLKP	
Aleksander Ansberg	NLKP	
Evi Anton		
Hilda Anton		
Vaiki Auksmann		
Pavel Beljajev	NLKP	
Klavdia Belova		
Mihhail Berdnikov	NLKP	
Arseni Blum	NLKP	
Hiili Burmeister	NLKP	
Ferdinand Eisen	NLKP	
Lidia Ems		
Gustav Ernesaks		
Arnold Green	NLKP	
Valter Hallmägi	NLKP	
Leida Hennok		
Valentin Haritonov	NLKP	
Aliise Ilm		
Aino Ilus		
Harald Ilves	NLKP	
Kaarel Ird	NLKP	
Klavdija Ivanova		
Endel Jaanimägi	NLKP	
Meta Jangolenko (Vannas)	NLKP	
Silva Janson		
Boris Jefremov	NLKP	
Nikolai Johanson	NLKP	
Helve Järva	NLKP	
Ilmar Jürisson	NLKP	
Meranda Jürjestaust	NLKP	
Juhan-Kaspar Jürna	NLKP	
Olga Kaasik		Died in office on 19.04.1971
Ruppert Kaik	NLKP	
Linda Kalden		
Jaan Kalev	NLKP	
Maie Kalev		
Salme Kaljuste	NLKP	
Väino Kaljuvee	NLKP	
Miralda-Elfriede Kallasmaa		
Valter Kamm	NLKP	
Arnold Karu	NLKP	
Elmar Kase	NLKP	
Linda Kase		
Richard-Paul Keer	NLKP	
Salme Kiin	NLKP	
Ivi Kivi		
Aksel Kivistik		
Valter Klauson (Klaussen)	NLKP	
Vassili Konstantinov	NLKP	
Arnold Kööp	NLKP	
Boris Kortšemkin	NLKP	
Aleksei Kotov	NLKP	
Vallot Kristal	NLKP	
Astrid Kroon		
Vambola Kruus	-, NLKP	
Voldemar Kruus		
Vassili Kubarev	NLKP	
Oskar Kuul	NLKP	
Vello Kõiv	NLKP	
Ivan Käbin	NLKP	
Vladimir Käo	NLKP	
Hilma Laiõunpuu		
Leonid Lentsman	NLKP	Elected 14.06.1970
Arseni Leonov	NLKP	
Heiner Loik	NLKP	
Hans Loit		
Helbe Lossmann		
Elmu Luht		
Velta Lõhmus	NLKP	
Maimo Lõiv		
Lembit Länts	NLKP	
Jaan Lüllemets	NLKP	
Viktor Maamägi	NLKP	
Ago Madik	NLKP	
Vladimir Makarov	NLKP	
August Matveus		
Vladimir Meister	NLKP	
Otto Merimaa	NLKP	
Vello Metsoja		
Aleksander Mette	NLKP	
Helo Mitt		
Ivan Molev	NLKP	
Harald Männik	NLKP	
Heili Müüripeal	NLKP	
Aleksei Müürisepp	NLKP	Died in office on 07.10.1970
Ivan Naglõi	NLKP	
Paul Neerot	NLKP	
Georg Nellis	NLKP	
Erika Niilop	NLKP	
Albert Norak	NLKP	
Valter Nugis	NLKP	Died in office on 12.06.1969
Vilma Nurme	NLKP	
Kalev Nõmm	NLKP	
Maia Nõmmiste		
Evald Okas		
Laine Ots		
Hilda Paju	NLKP	
Erig Pappel		
Vilma Paulus	-, NLKP	
Koidu Piiri (Kivioja)	ÜLKNÜ	
Rein Pollimann	NLKP	
August Pork	NLKP	
Veniamin Porõvkin	NLKP	
Ääre Purga	NLKP	Elected 07.09.1969
Evi Puusepp		
Evi Põllumäe		
Voldemar Põllus	NLKP	
Feliks Pärtelpoeg	NLKP	
Karl Püss	NLKP	
Harri Raag	NLKP	
Ossia Raamat	NLKP	
Aksel Raja	NLKP	
Alice Randlo		
Vello Ranne	NLKP	
Valter Raudsalu	NLKP	
Helbe Raudsepp	NLKP	
Eha Rego	ÜLKNÜ	
Laine Roomere		
Hildegard Roosaar	NLKP	
Aili Rungi		
Arnold Rüütel	NLKP	
Naima Saar	NLKP	
August Saaremägi	NLKP	
Gustav Sarri	NLKP	
Albert Schön		
Johannes Semper	NLKP	
Lidia Sepp		
Nikolai Serebrjannikov	NLKP	
Richard Sibul	NLKP	
Ants Sillar	NLKP	
Leida Sipria	NLKP	
Elvi Suuk (Kruus)		
Jüri Suurhans	NLKP	
Olga Suurmats		
Mihhail Sturm	NLKP	
Vassili Žiljabin	NLKP	
Arvo Taal	NLKP	
Friedrich Tamm	NLKP	
Müa Tauts		
Kalju Teras	NLKP	
Ants Tiinas	NLKP	
Kuno Todeson	NLKP	
Boris Tolbast	NLKP	
Velda Toomla		
Silvia Truupõld	NLKP	
Jevgeni Tsõganov	NLKP	Died in office on 23.05.1971
Stepan Tšernikov	NLKP	
Ivan Tuhkru	NLKP	
Erich Tui		
Ellen Tumala		
Edgar Tõnurist	NLKP	
Linda Ummelk		
Fjodor Ušanjov	NLKP	
Artur Vader	NLKP	
Ilmar Vahe	NLKP	
Linda Vaikmaa		
Silvia Vain	NLKP	
Karl Vaino	NLKP	
Valter Vaino	NLKP	
Aleksander Valkonen	NLKP	
Helgi Vasar		
Pjotr Vassikov	NLKP	
Miralda Vassiljeva		
Nikifor Vavilov	NLKP	
Arnold Veimer	NLKP	
Albert Vendelin	NLKP	
Eha Veskimägi	NLKP	
Väino Viilup	NLKP	
Aksel Vimberg	NLKP	
Juri Vladõtšin	NLKP	
Jevgeni Volkov	NLKP	
Vaime Võsa		
