= Kallukse Landscape Conservation Area =

Protected area in Estonia

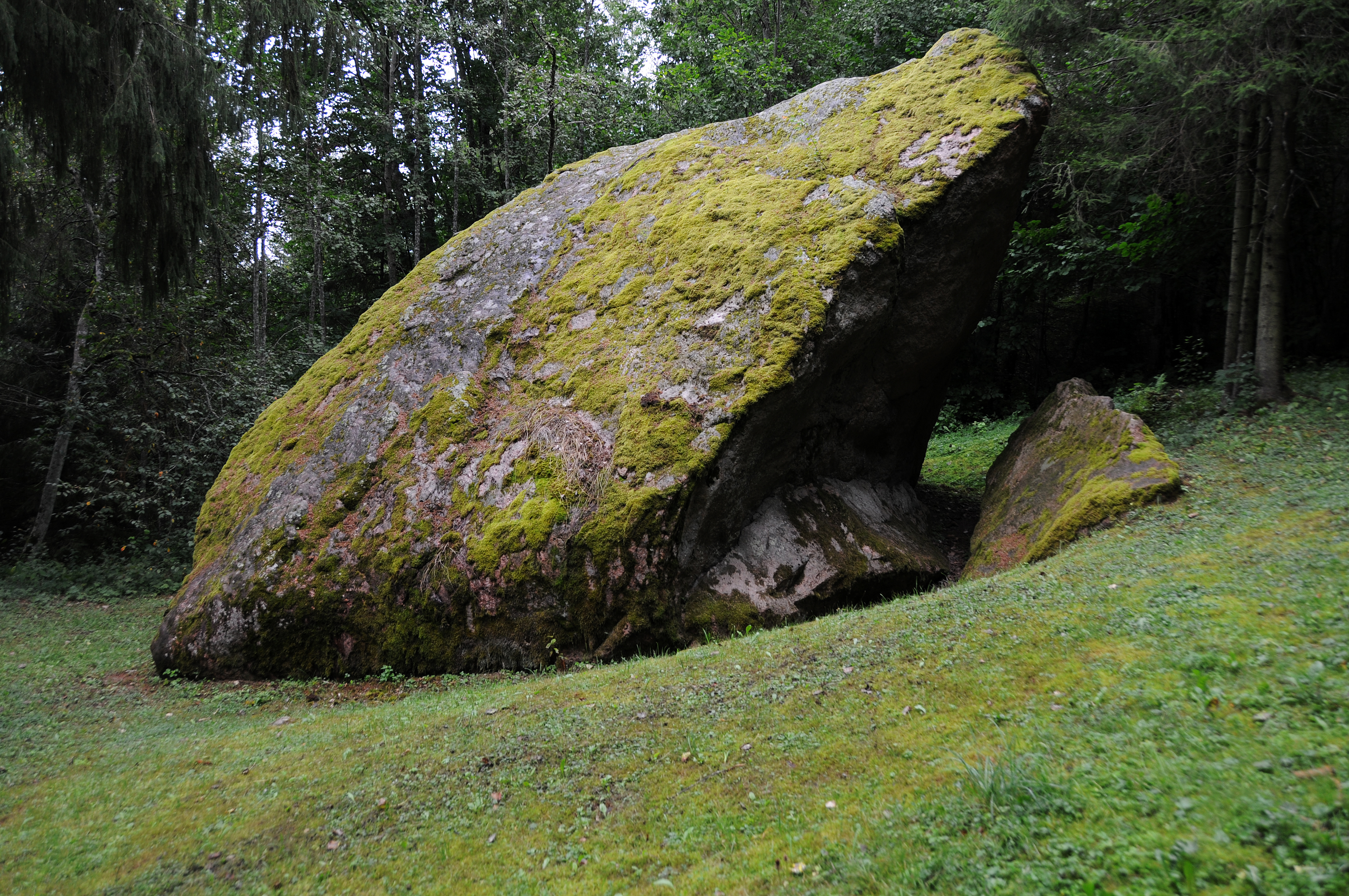

- Location within Estonia
- Location: Estonia
- Coordinates: 59°21′30″N 26°04′30″E
- Area: 232 ha (570 acres)
- Established: 1978 (1998)

Kallukse Landscape Conservation Area is a nature park situated in Lääne-Viru County, Estonia.

Its area is 232 ha.

The protected area was designated in 1978 to protect nature and landscapes near Kallukse and its surrounding areas. In 1998, the protected area was redesigned to the landscape conservation area.
