= Mare Tommingas =

Estonian dancer and ballet choreographer

Mare Tommingas (born 6 November 1959) is an Estonian dancer, choreographer, and director of the ballet company of Vanemuine in Tartu, Estonia.

== Awards ==
- 1986: Honored Teacher of the Estonian SSR
- 2006: Order of the White Star, 4th Class
