= Hein Vergo =

Estonian educator (1899–1998)

- Born: Theodor Thaalmann; December 30, 1899; Viljandi County, Governorate of Estonia, Russian Empire
- Died: 1998
- Occupation: Educator

Hein Vergo (until 1934 Theodor (also Teodor or Feodor) Taalmann (also Thaalmann); December 30, 1899 – 1998) was an Estonian teacher and school principal.

Hein Vergo was born in Viljandi County in the Governorate of Estonia, Russian Empire. In 1922, Vergo graduated from Tallinn Teacher Training College, and he worked in the editorship of the newspaper Meie Hääl in 1922. From 1922 to 1924 he worked as a teacher at Vändra High School, from 1924 to 1932 as a teacher at Haljava School, and from 1932 to 1942 as the principal of Neeme Elementary School in Jõelähtme Parish. From 1940 to 1941, he was the principal of the seven-year school in Haljava. During the Second World War, a disability prevented him from fighting, and he worked on a collective farm in the Tatar Autonomous Republic and then relocated to the Uvelsky District in the Chelyabinsk Oblast, where he taught at a school and headed an orphanage. On December 20, 1944, he returned to Estonia, where he was again the principal of the school in Haljava from 1945 to 1947. From 1949 to 1960 he was the principal of Aruküla Basic School.

== Awards ==
- 1946: Medal "For Labour Valour"
- 1946: Honored Teacher of the Estonian SSR
