= Jaan Kurn =

Estonian teacher and poet (1893–1981)

- Born: April 13, 1893; Metsakuru, Governorate of Livonia, Russian Empire
- Died: March 30, 1981 (aged 87); Tallinn, then part of Estonian SSR, Soviet Union
- Occupations: Teacher, poet, and translator

Jaan Kurn (April 13, 1893 – March 30, 1981) was an Estonian teacher, poet, and translator.

== Early life and education ==
Kurn was born on the Patsi farm in the village of Metsakuru, Kärstna Parish, in the Governorate of Livonia, Russian Empire (now in the village of Veisjärve), the son of the cottager Jaan Kurn (c. 1851–?) and Kadri Kurn (née Naestema, 1865–?). He attended Kärstna Ministerial School. From 1910 to 1914 he studied at Tartu Teacher Training College, and then from 1917 to 1920 at the Kherson Pedagogical Institute in southern Ukraine. The poet Hendrik Adamson—the son of the property owner's daughter—was born in the same house.

== Career ==
From 1914 to 1917, Kurn was the principal of Igavere Primary School in Haaslava Parish, and then a teacher at Räpina Ministerial School and Kärdla Primary School. From 1920 to 1923, he taught history at Narva Science High School No. 1, and then edited the newspaper Põhja Kodu while still teaching in Narva. From 1925 to 1940, he was the principal of the six-year Maidla Primary School in Virumaa. and then from 1940 to 1941 the principal of Rakvere Secondary School No. 1. During the war years, he was evacuated to the rear of the USSR, and he worked at the Nevyansk orphanage in the Sverdlovsk Oblast. From 1944 to 1947 he was the head of the education department in Virumaa, and from 1947 to 1950 he was the director of Rakvere Teacher Training College. From January to August 1950, Kurn worked at Tallinn Middle School No. 20 and then at Tallinn High School No. 1 for Young Workers, after which he was the head of the Rakvere Teacher Training School.

== Poetry ==
Alongside his work as a teacher and administrator, Kurn wrote poems under the name Ralf Rond. His first collection, 27, was published in Narva in 1923 and caused extensive controversy in the press. Accused of indecency, the author was fined in 1926 and the book was ordered to be destroyed. Ralf Rond's verses with their atheistic orientation, robust expression, and futuristic lines were influenced by the young Vladimir Mayakovsky, as well as August Alle and Henrik Visnapuu, and they criticize the moral laxity during and after the war. Ralf Rond's sentimental early verses were published in the collection Liblikad in Narva in 1925. In the poetry collection Naine (Narva, 1926) he continued his robust and sarcastic style, and his contemporary satire increased. His protest verses were published in the newspaper Uus Edasi in 1929 and elsewhere. From them, he compiled his fourth collection of poems, Nälg, which was not published because he could not find a publisher. Ralf Rond was the first to introduce and translate Vladimir Mayakovsky in Estonia. He also translated Mayakovsky's A Cloud in Trousers (Narva, 1930). In the 1920s, he published articles on literary issues, and at the end of his life he wrote a book of memoirs, Minu eluraamatu helgeid ja tumedaid lehekülgi (Light and Dark Pages of My Life's Book), which has remained in manuscript.

== Political activity ==
During the interwar period, Kurn was a member of the Labor Party. In 1940, he aligned himself with the new Soviet government; he was a non-party Bolshevik (he did not join the party because of the rigid command system that prevailed there). In 1941, he joined a destruction battalion and participated in battles at Kadrina and near Simuna Cemetery. From 1950 to 1951, the Soviet authorities persecuted Kurn.

== Awards ==
- 1947: Honored Teacher of the Estonian SSR

== Bibliography ==
- 1923: 27 (Narva: "Wironia" kirjastus)
- 1925: Liblikad (Narva: "Vironia" kirjastus)
- 1926: Naine (Narva: Kirjastus "Er-ku-la")
