= Helga Kurm =

Estonian pedagogical scientist

- Born: Helga Anton; 11 January 1920; Kõue, Estonia
- Died: 7 January 2011 (aged 90); Tartu, Estonia
- Occupation: Pedagogue

Helga Kurm (11 January 1920 – 7 January 2011) was an Estonian pedagogical scientist. She was docent of the Tartu State University's Pedagogical Division. She authored works such as Sinule, tütarlaps (1970) and Eesti NSV teeneline õpetaja (1975), and Iz Istorii narodnogo obrazovanija Pribaltiki (1977).

== Awards ==
- 1975: Honored Teacher of the Estonian SSR
