= Harri Jõgisalu =

Estonian children's writer

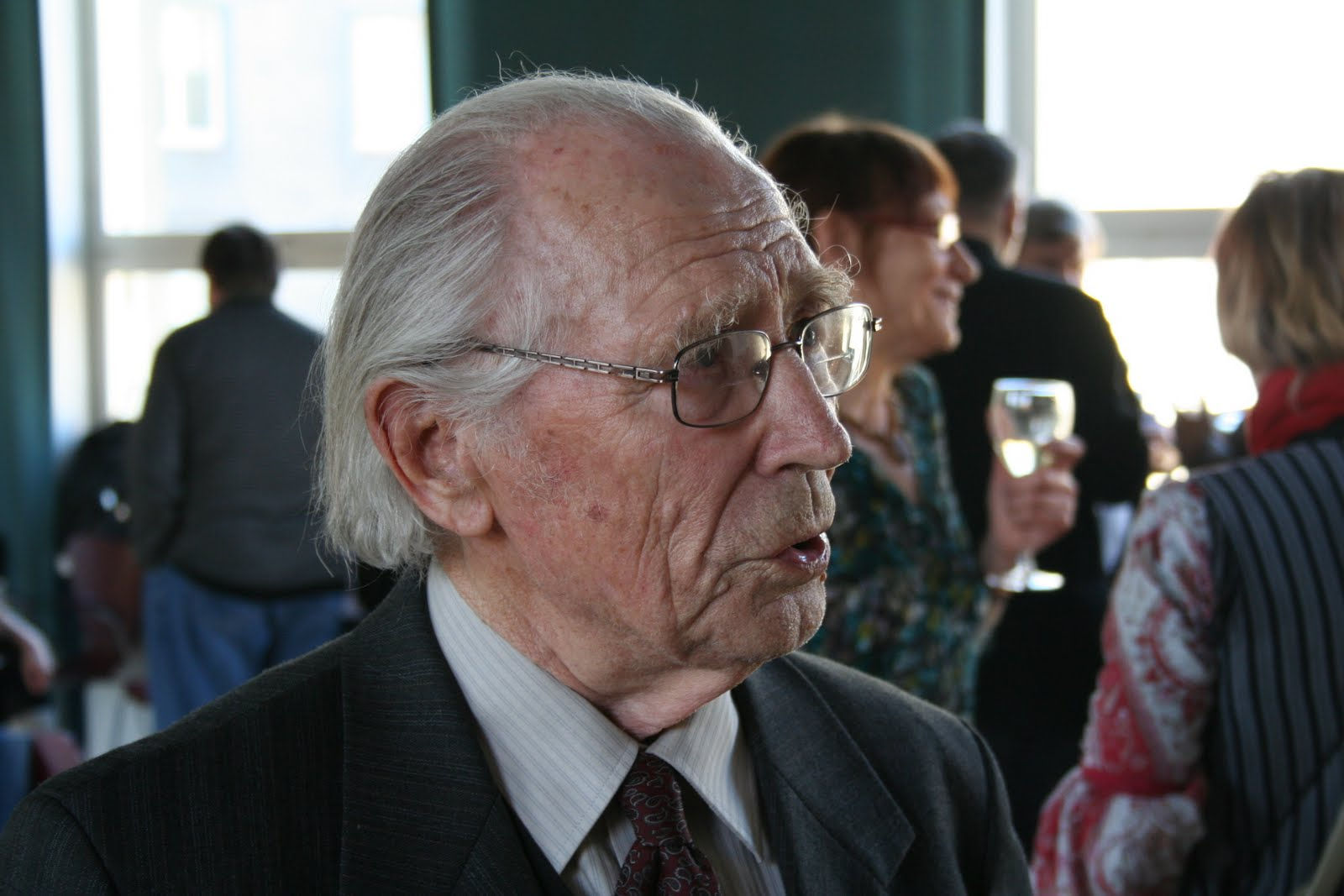
Harri Jõgisalu (2011)

Harri Jõgisalu (until 1936 Harri Konstabel; 24 August 1922 in Korju, Paadrema Parish, Lääne County – 18 September 2014) was an Estonian children's writer. He wrote mainly about nature and traditional rural life.

During World War II, he fought in the German army. From 1944 to 1946, he was a prisoner of war in Parakhino, Russia. In 1950, he graduated from Tallinn Teachers' Institute and in 1955 from the Leningrad Pedagogical Institute as a teacher of chemistry and biology. From 1947 to 1978, he taught at Märjamaa Secondary School.

== Selected works ==
- 1967: short story "Käopoja tänu" ('The Cuckoo-chick's Thanks')
- 1982: short story "Kärp" ('The Stoat')
- 1984: short story "Maaleib" ('Bread of the Land')

== Awards ==
- 1962: Honored Teacher of the Estonian SSR
