= Villem Orav =

Estonian historian and pedagogical scientist

Villem Orav (11 March 1883 in Laiksaare municipality – 10 December 1952 in Tallinn) was an Estonian historian, teacher, and scholar of pedagogy.

In 1905 he graduated from Riga Theological Seminary, and in 1911–13 studied at the University of Warsaw, He was a history teacher from 1917 to 1949 at Gustav Adolf Grammar School. In 1952 he became a researcher of the Tallinn Institute of History.

He published several pedagogical books, as well as magazine reviews, and methodological articles, including "Eesti NSV ajaloo lugemiku I" (1960), "Psühholoogia õpperaamat pedagoogilistele koolidele" (1948), and "Ajaloo õpetamise metoodika seitsmeklassilises koolis" (1949).

In 1949 he was awarded the title Honored Teacher of the Estonian SSR

== Awards ==
- 1946: Honored Teacher of the Estonian SSR
