= Honored Teacher of the Estonian SSR =

Honorary title of the Estonian SSR

Honored Teacher of the Estonian SSR (Estonian: Eesti NSV teeneline õpetaja) was an honorary title in the Estonian SSR, which the Presidium of the Supreme Council of the Estonian SSR awarded to teachers from 1945 to 1989.

== Recipients ==
- 1945: Johannes Käis, Juhan Lang, Enn Murdmaa, Rudolf Reiman, Erika Siilivask, Aleksander Valsiner
- 1946: Johannes Kallak, Ivan Maksimov, Rudolf Meriloo, Ida-Luise Ollik, Villem Orav, Eduard Praks, Priidu Puusepp, Ants Selmet, Hein Vergo
- 1947: Karl Anton, Eduard Aus, Jaan Gutves, August Kasvand, Jaan Kurn, Robert Rägastik, Juhan Taimsoo, Karl Vares
- 1950: Anna Jevdokimova, Kristjan Kure, Voldemar Oja, Alfred Reinvald, Alma Taimsoo, Johannes Vilippius
- 1955: Zinaida Käärik, Olga Padosep, Veera Prinkmann, Boris Rea, Aleksandra Skrõljova, Voldemar Veltbach
- 1956: Aadu Aalde, Orest Niinemäe
- 1957: Hilda Aver, August Gebruk, Anna-Elvira Järv, Eduard Kattai, Aadu Lamson, Jaan Pakk, Georg Roovik, Veera Saar, Ella Sepp, Elfrida Solnask
- 1958: Klavdia Gorbunova, Marie Kingsepp, Hilja Levandi, Jakob Luka, Felitsata Prohhorova, Niine Rand, Juliana Ridalu, Leena Roots, Helmi Saarend, Veera Tšerešneva, Alvine Viikov
- 1959: Arvo Lehis
- 1960: Alma Allika, Rosamunde Aulas, Liidia Bogdanova, Maria Buntšak, Nadežda Grigorjeva, Emilie Järvalt, Aleksander Kallaste, Salme-Hildegard Kallaste, Ella Kert, Zinaida Klimberg, Bronislava Kovalevskaja, Johannes Kristjan, Niina Kurve, August Kärstna, Hans Leibur, Jelizaveta Maljarova, Valentin Marvet, Rudolf Oja, Natalia Pentre, Karl Praakli, Eduard Prei, Jekaterina Premet, Meta Pärnamägi, Viktor Pöhl, Heinrich Reisenbuk, Pauline Ronk, Liisa Saukas, Aadu Sepp, Agnes Sviguzova, Amanda Sõrmus, Vassili Zubov, Mahta Životnikova, Felicia-Ingeborg Tarkus, Jelizaveta Titova, Heinrich Tobias, Olga Truus, Ljudmilla Tsirp, Alide-Vilhelmine Tuulmets, Helmi-Johanna Uibopuu, Emilie Veeber, Anna Vester, Meeta Viks, Salme Väinaste, Helmi Väli, Paul Üksik
- 1962: Leida Annus, Elmi Hakk, Liidia Julle, Harri Jõgisalu, Valeria Kaljo, Polina Kirsanova, Leontine Kivihall, Martin Kütt, Maria Lekstein, Salme Lepasaar, Elmar Lepp, Meta Loog, Valter Metti, Elle Mälberg, Arnu Orasmäe, Elfrida Peld, Olga Peterson, Agnes Piirma, Vladimir Põhjane, Nikolai Remmel, Leonora Rinken, Varvara Sõtšova, Vilja Toomi, Jelena Vassiljeva, Felita Viikna, Veronika Viiret
- 1963: Endel Arand, Anatolia Dubinina, Emilde Mikuri, Aino Pedoste, Adele Peebo, Zoja Raževa, Aleksandra Sarv, Linda Soovik, Elvi Speek, Aksel Stiuff, Helga Tambek, Alleks Vallner, Lembitu Varblane
- 1964: Rudolf Jõks, Arnold Kask, Jüri Kipper, Anto Korp, Anna Mirka, Mihhail Mratškovski, Heino Mägi, Helju Mägi, Jevgenia Nimenskaja, Heino Nurmiste, Viktor Ordlik, Vaike Pugal, Hilda Roosvee, Eha Ruven, Zoja Silla, Voldemar Soodla, Anna Suhhova, Jaan Tammaru, Artur Tiki, Melly Vahter, Leida Vahtra
- 1965: Alice Ehin, Erika Franz, Ella Gorelova, Boris Henrichson, Arnold Isotamm, Richard Kalling, Jekaterina Kravtsova, Elmar Loodus, Paul Masing, Robert Meister, Kaarel Miljaste, Jekaterina Pavlova, Endel Pirn, Helle Raigna, Melanie Rauk, Veera Reitsnik, Pear Rootalu, Olev Saarep, Ella Seensalu, Ants Sillar, Erna Sööt, Nikolai Šestakov, Helene Talts, Kalju Tamm, Meeta Terri, Bella Tšausskaja, Lev Volovik
- 1966: Zinaida Aleksejeva, Ija Batarina, Ilse Erm, Laine Kadajas, Helga Kariis, August Kelder, Leonid Klimberg, Alice Kriisa, Arvo Kuslap, Bernhard Kärbis, Olev Kärner, Liia Leetmaa, Eva Lootsar, Feliks Oorn, Harald Reinop, Nadežda Sahharova, Valentine Sisask, Liidia Tanimäe, Kalju Teras, Niina Vieveger
- 1967: Robert Adamson, Erna Aljasmets, Leida Annus, Aleksandra Beljajeva, Erika Eisenschmidt, Helene Eomõis, Viktor Kuriks, Aire Kutsar, Florida Lahi, Ellen Lätt, Niina Raadik, Endel Reimann, Rahil Saltsmann, Klara Tisler, Feliks Toode, Evald Tõnisson, Johannes Valgma, Anna Vassiljeva, Leontine Vesper
- 1968: Aleksandra Gromova, Elmar Kanter, Helga Kriiel, Niina Kurvits, Melania Lepner, Bernhard Liiv, Elena Makus, Maimu Maran, Oliver Masing, Voldemar Pihlau, Ella Pross, Arkadi Reigo, Daniel Vardia, Rein Virkus
- 1969: Arkadi Didõk, Harri Kelder, Leida Kokk, Alma Kull, Helju Normet, Oskar Pork, Enda Põld, Heli Raidla, Virve Rea, Elmar Roosna, Liidia Šapkina, Jelena Žarkova, Zinaida Tšurkina, John Tungal, Endel Vahersalu, Otto Õun
- 1970: Maie Aasa, Armilda Andrjuštšenko, Juta Anepajo, Albert Baumverk, Valdeko Bergmann, Elfriede Eljand, Milvi-Evi Frolova, Helju Ivaštšenko, Truuta Jerkavits, Elmar Kalmus, Heino Klaassen, Heino Kostabi, Meeta Kristel, Juta Kubja, Vladimir Lill, Arnold Mölder, Maria Petuhhova, Silvia Suumann, Jevgenia Ševtsenko, Andrei Zarubin, Eha Teppo, Juta Tomingas, Saima Vainola, Arvo Veski, Maimu Vetemaa, Helvi Voore
- 1971: Tamara Gorbatšova, Hillar Hansson, Salme Harkmaa, Igor Holts, Salme Järv, Heldur Koolmeister, Ervin Kukk, Ivan Kutukov, Harry Kuusk, Rubo Kõverjalg, Karl Köösel, Endel Läte, Juta Ott, Karl Pettai, Helve Raik, Voldemar Ramp, Anna Rinne, Asta Roosipõld, Heino Tiidus, Rosalia Tubinšlak, Olga Valter
- 1972: Erna Aabne, Kalju Aigro, Koidula Basarov, Kanilda Blaufeldt, Asta Eero, Taimi Innos, Solomon Itsekson, Boris Kivi, Heino Klaas, Magda Kogel, Laine Kolmann, Enn Nurk, Nikolai Paisnik, Vikki Pennonen, Antonina Petrova, Linda Rand, Helmut Saarman, Emma Takis, Lehte Viljaste
- 1973: Nadežda Asari, Agnes Aunapuu, Klavdia Bogomolova, Niina Freimann, Helmi Hendrikson, Tatjana Jegorova, Heints Kavak, Tiiu Kiudorv, Armas Kuldsepp, Maria Kuzmitševa, Laine Levald, Agnessa Lihten, Allan Liim, Odette Lillemägi, Agnes Mälksoo, Harri Raide, Olga Rajaleid, Lembit Rannast, Valve Rannula, Albert Redkin, Aita Riitsalu, Helle Saarsoo, Eha Sillam, Silvia Sööt, Meta Tamm, Ellen Voitk
- 1974: Nikolai Antonov, Heino Einer, Ferdinand Eisen, Hain Hiieaas, Vello Juurik, Arno Kivi, Linda Kärbis, Liia-Mariette Laanpere, Leonhard Liiskmaa, Valentina Maksimova, Lea-Maie Moks, Leili Möller, Õilme Oglas, Jakob Oja, Lia Paaver, Hillar Palamets, Hans Pukk, Helmut Pärnamägi, Raivo Pütsep, Rudolf Räk, Vilma Sahva, Heldur Samel, Veniamin Smirnov, Otto Terno, Villem Treiman, Virve Tsahkna, Valentina Tšukina, Valentina Vinogradova, Valdo Väinaste
- 1975: Arvet Ansper, Alevtina Bazanova, Virgi Jalakas, Helga Kurm, Viola Kõiv, Evald Kägo, Kalju Leht, Toomas Lepiksaar, Õie Lepind, Mai Maiste, Viivi Mets, Silvia Miller, Lia Palmse, Liidia Piirsalu, Ilmar Reiman, Helve Roosaar, Ago Russak, Eevi Rõuk, Silvi Saar, Maria Savvova, Olga Silinina, Ljudmila Šergalina, Evi Šmutova, Helge Tootsman, Rosiine Tõnspoeg, Vaike Vaide, Jüri Vene, Selma-Aliide Vernik, Nelli Vester
- 1976: Lilia Buidina, Eha Hiie, Endel Isop, Aino Juhkam, Ilmi Kalamann, Niina Kartševskaja, Aksel Kersna, Laine Kilusk, Aino Kukk, Liidia Laidla, Gita-Maren Linnaks, Viktor Luigelaht, Biruta Malm, Milvi Pedak, Lehte Rein, Arseni Reinumäe, Erika Rohumäe, Endla Sepp, Zinaida Zagoskina, Aino Tamm, Malle Tammpere, Jelena Timošonok, Jakob Unt, Leo Villand
- 1977: Linda Altin, Milvi Amer, Aleksander Elango, Ilja Geiker, Endel Klaassen, Armilde Koppelmann, Aino Kurmiste, Arnold Masing, Osvald Nilson, Hillar Põldoja, Ljudmila Rebane, Rutt Reinaste, Hubert Roohein, Boris Rosenstein, Niina Smirnova, Asta Suss, Ants Teder, Sulev Torri, Eduard Trull, Valentina Turištševa, Elsa Värte
- 1978: Valter Haamer, Veljo Kabonen, Elvi Kaisma, Ellen Kansa, Osvald Kukk, Tamara Laas, Endel Lepik, Elvi Liim, Ruut Liiv, Aavo Lind, Heilde de Etna Nadel, Jekaterina Pašenitševa, Olav Raie, Karin Rammulus, Anu-Liis Randrüüt, Vello Saage, Silvi Salm
- 1979: Otto Amer, Ljudmilla Hadunkina, Vaike Ilves, Asta Järve, Niina Koršakova, Endel Kukner, Ellen Kuum, Carmen Kuusik, Hillar Lauri, Karin Lätte, Antidea Metsa, Vera Oliševskaja, Olga Pivovarova, Jelizaveta Pokk, Eevi Salm, Elli Teras, Maila-Urve Tolmov, Uno Varik, Venda Virit
- 1980: Veljo Aava, Ljubov Breganova, Galina Griško, Gunnar Karu, Vaike Kaskman, Olga Kängsep, Hans Makus, Milvi Mellis, Hilda Metsallik, Milvi Piho, Jevgenia Potapenko, Riho Rosin, Jaan-Ülo Saar, Sven-Allan Sagris, Maria Tarasova, Mia Tikop, Hilda Vaiksaar, Leonhard Vent, Helmi Viikholm, Viktor Višnjov
- 1981: Batõr Adõlov, Margit Ilves, Uuno Jõgi, Liidia Kaitsmaa, Pelageja Kiritšenko, Maria Kulešova, Evald Laprik, Hartvig Lausma, Tiiu Maasik, Elli Muru, Aino Pärdijaak, Hilja Rauk, Vaike Raup, Heino Savi, Sulev Siirmets, Nonna Stoljarova, Olga Šlõpkina, Juta Veisserik, Linda Viilip
- 1982: Ljubov Avvo, Uno Erdmann, Ester Haljaste, Jekaterina Korsakova, Leelo Kõlar, Ellen Lepasson, Lilia Lipilina, Aime Nipper, Hugo Saaremets, Galina Šahhina, Helene-Marie Teär, Maimu-Julianna Veri, Aglaja Voronina
- 1983: Loreida Gross, Piia Jõks, Valentina Kaminskaja, Tiiu Merits, Tamara Palgi, Elfrida Peep, Linda Purru, Larisa Revjakina, Ljudmila Semjonova, Sergei Sovetnikov, Nadežda Šumilova, Harald Tekko, Heino Vilipere
- 1984: Albina Afanasenko, Õie Esna, Harald Hõim, Maimo Isand, Lembi Ivask, Larissa Kalinina, Heljo Lieberg, Tiiu Loog, Nadežda Makarenko, Valter Malm, Niina Mihejeva, Aleksander Prikk, Jaan Reimand, Õie Räim, Heljo Saar, Aleksei Semutenko, Evald Teras, Leonid Tšerkassov, Marge-Anne Vallaste, Tatjana Zaugarova
- 1985: Niina Belova, Niina Demehhina, Taavi Esko, Eleonora Grišakova, Anna Haljak, Galina Ivanova, Margareta Jõgi, Toivo Kirsi, Hedvig Kokk, Ülo Kõpp, Ella Lunts, Aleksandra Mustina, Mihkel Naams, Anu Ojaveer, Kalju Rahu, Malle Ranniku, Veera Rudnikova, Oleg Rumjantsev, Tiiu Saava, Aino Tootsi
- 1986: Kalju Aleksius, Nadežda Azorova, Jevgenia Holomjenkova, Erich Jõgi, Mare Kihu, Tiiu Kolk, Nikolai Kuptsov, Aadi Künnapuu, Lii Laansalu, Elga Lekk, Maire Lulla, Evi Merusk, Vera Neverdinova, Valve Orav, Elli Palusoo, Helgi Parvelo, Matti Piirimaa, Lidia Strepetova, Viive Tiideberg, Mare Tommingas, Tamara Turpakova, Alfred Vakk, Olav Vallimäe
- 1987: Arvi Altmäe, Ljubov Guljavina, Ivi Helves, Valentina Ivin, Lennart Jõela, Helvi Kallasmaa, Urve Kilk, Tatjana Kišmišjan, Helgi Klein, Eha Kokamägi, Vaido Kobrand, Julia Konõševa, Alevtina Kraskova, Eevi Kukker, Aino Kulm, Jadviga Kunšina, Klavdija Kustova, August Kõrbe, Paul Lehestik, Aare Liiv, Tiia Loitme, Vladimir Maier, Laas Masing, Jaan Muri, Elle Oruste, Liidi Pajumägi, Riho Pulk, Mare Rossmann, Koidu Salomets, Aimi Säremat, Raissa Šagal, Svetlana Žemtšužina, Ilder Tallo, Kaarel Tetsmann, Olga Trelina, Taimi Velström,
- 1988: Tamara Aava, Karl Elken, Aino Halumets, Vilma Kahk, Ilja Karpik, Svetlana Kulikova, Arvi Liik, Ljudmilla Orlova, Heli Pastak, Milli-Irene Pedajas, Friida Prisk, Väino Roose, Ly Saks, Vapper Sirk, Luise-Maria Sokolova, Liia Tiigi, Leida Troost, Oskar Tuvik, Mare Umbaed
- 1989: Henrik Ahven, Kaupo Antzon, Harri Eilart, Maie Ivanainen, Vera Jefremova, Valter Johanson, Jaan Kivistik, Heldi Kuus, Tiiu-Reet Kõrven, Jaan Murd, Vilve Männa, August Solo, Nikolai Tšurilin, Leo Tõnisson, Helgi Viirelaid
