= Priidu Puusepp =

Estonian educator and linguist (1887–1972)

- Born: Friedrich Puusepp; February 11, 1887; Võru, Governorate of Livonia, Russian Empire
- Died: November 1, 1972 (aged 85); Tartu, Estonia
- Occupations: Educator and linguist

Priidu Puusepp (until 1936 Friedrich Puusepp; February 11, 1887 – November 1, 1972) was an Estonian educator and linguist.

== Early life and education ==
Priidu Puusepp was born in Võru, the son of Gustav Puusepp (1858–1905), a tailor, and Emma Amalie Puusepp (née Hermann, 1864–1925). In 1905, he graduated from a teacher training program in Valga.

== Career ==
From 1905 to 1914, Puusepp was a teacher in the rural schools of Võru County and Pärnu County. His teaching career was interrupted by service in the Imperial Russian Army from 1914 to 1917. From 1917 to 1920 he taught at Võru High School, from 1922 to 1932 at Tallinn Teacher Training College, and from 1932 to 1944 at Elementary School No. 16 in Tartu. In 1940, Puusepp was certified as a secondary and vocational school teacher of Estonian language and literature by the University of Tartu. From 1946 to 1953 he taught in the Russian language department of the University of Tartu.

Puusepp wrote 32 language textbooks for schools with a combined print run of one million. Several of them were used as basic textbooks for decades.

Puusepp studied Russian grammar and synonymy, publishing Vene keele rektsioone (Russian Case Government), Vene keele sünonüüme (Russian Synonyms), and other works. He prepared an extensive manuscript for his Vene-eesti fraseoloogilise sõnaraamatu (Russian–Estonian Phraseological Dictionary), which, however, has not been published. As a theater enthusiast, he published articles on stage art.

== Bibliography ==
- 1921: Käsiraamat Eesti keele õigekirjutuse õppimiseks (Võru: S. Songi)
- 1923: Keelelised harjutused (Tartu: Odamees-Carl Sarap)
- 1929: Eesti keele grammatika koolidele (Tartu: Loodus)
- 1931: Soome keele õpetus algajaile (Tartu: Loodus)
- 1932: Kirjakeele algmeid (Tartu: Kool)
- 1932–1936: Elav sõna. I–IV (Tartu: Kool)
- 1936: Etteütlusi I–II. Algkooli noorematele ja vanematele klassidele ning keskkoolile (Tartu: Kool)
- 1940: Vene keele õpik (with Artur Klaving) (Tallinn: Pedagoogiline Kirjandus)

== Awards ==
- 1946: Honored Teacher of the Estonian SSR
