= Erika Siilivask =

Estonian educator (1902–1993)

- Born: May 26, 1902; Jõksi, Governorate of Livonia, Russian Empire
- Died: August 27, 1993 (aged 91); Tallinn, Estonia
- Occupation: Educator

Erika Siilivask (until 1923 Erika Leontine Vassar; May 26, 1902 – August 27, 1993) was an Estonian pedagogue and school principal.

== Early life and family ==
Erika Siilivask was born Erika Leontine Vassar in Jõksi, Governorate of Livonia, Russian Empire, the daughter of Gustav Vassar (or Wassar, 1869–?) and Elisabeth (Betti) Vassar (née Teever, 1879 – c. 1969). She married Karl Aleksander Siilivask (1899–1941) and was the mother of the historian Karl Siilivask (1927–2017).

== Education ==
Siilivask studied at the Kanepi Parish school and Võru County Public Education Society Girls High School. In 1928, she graduated from the Pallas Art School in Tartu as a drawing teacher.

== Career ==
Starting in 1928, Siilivask worked as a substitute teacher in the schools of Võru County. In 1941, she became the head of the education department of the Võru County Executive Committee. From March to July 1943, she was the head of the Magnitogorsk orphanage, and from the fall of 1943 the director of the Uvelka Children's Home in the Chelyabinsk Oblast. From 1944 to 1946, she was the head of the education department of Võru County, and from 1945 to 1946 a member of the executive committee of the Council of Workers' Deputies of Võru County. From 1946 to 1961, she was the principal of Tartu Secondary School No. 3.

She died in Tallinn and is buried in Võru Cemetery.

== Awards ==
- 1945: Honored Teacher of the Estonian SSR
- 1948: Excellent Public Education Worker badge
- 1954: Medal "For Labor Valor"
- 1957: Certificate of Honor of the Presidium of the Council of Trade Unions of the Estonian SSR and badge of the All-Union Central Council of Trade Unions
- 1960: Order of Lenin
