= 1967 Estonian Supreme Soviet election =

1967 elections in Estonian SSR

Elections to the Supreme Soviet of the Estonian SSR were held on 19 March 1967. As with all previous elections of the Estonian SSR, the Bloc of Communists and Non-Party Candidates was the only party permitted to contest the elections and won all 178 seats.

== Results ==
Party	Votes	%	Seats
Bloc of Communists and Non-Party Candidates		99.64	178
Against		0.36	–
Total			178
Registered voters/turnout		99.67	
Source: Liivik

== See also ==
- List of members of the Supreme Soviet of the Estonian Soviet Socialist Republic, 1967–1971
