= Johannes Käis =

Estonian educator (1885–1950)

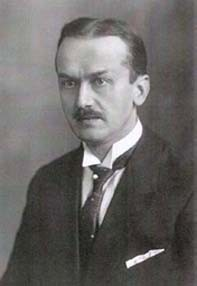
Johannes Käis

Johannes Käis (26 December 1885 – 29 April 1950) was an Estonian educator. He was a leading figure of the Estonian school renewal movement in the 1930s.

Käis was born in Rosma. In 1918 he graduated from Petrograd University. From 1903 to 1917 he worked as a teacher in Latvia. In 1920 he returned to Estonia.

From 1931 to 1940 he was the scientific secretary of the Estonian Teachers' Union.

== Awards ==
- 1945 Honored Teacher of the Estonian SSR
