= Lake Jõksi =

Lake in Estonia

- Jõksi järv (Estonian)
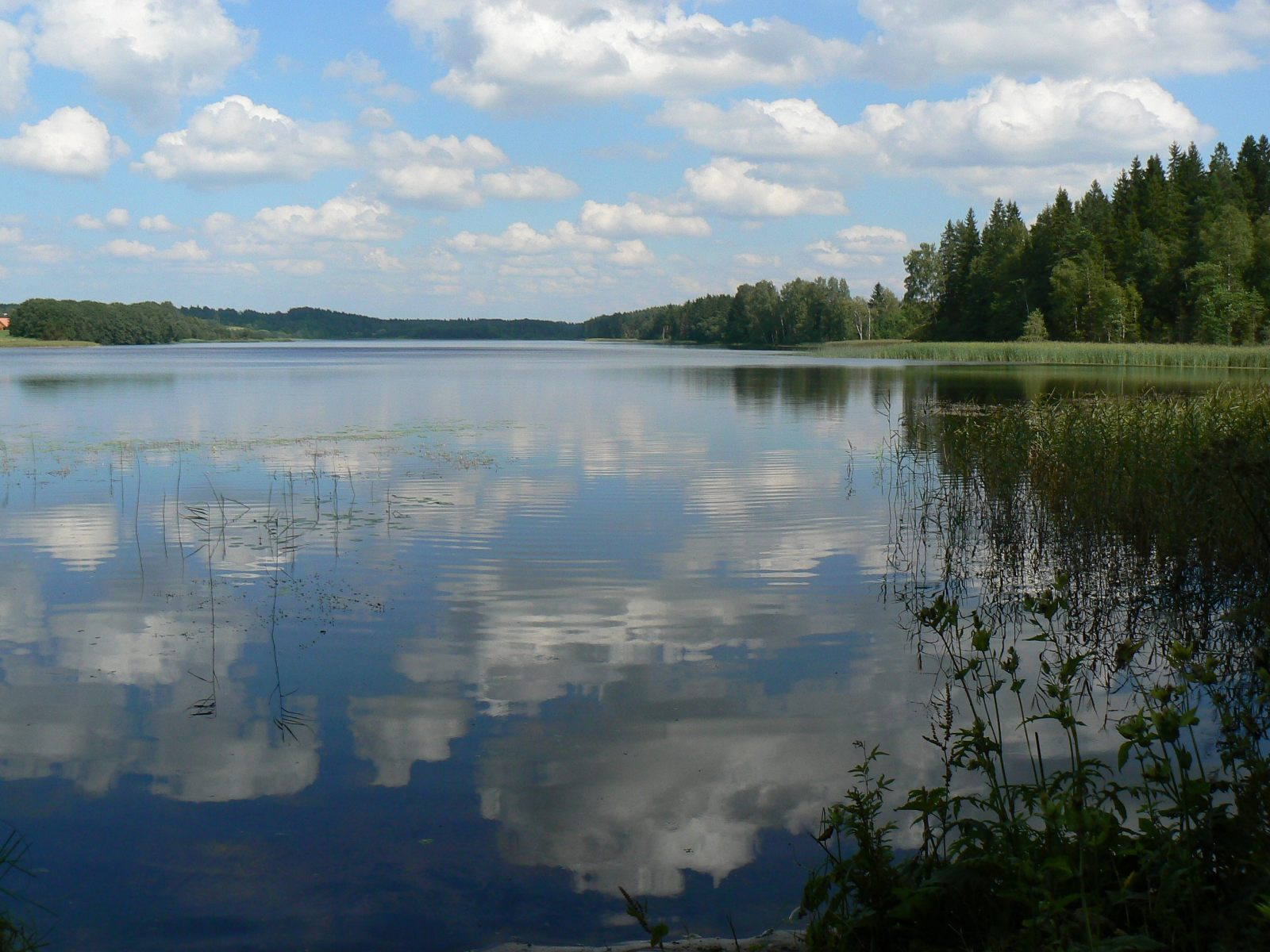

- Location within Estonia
- Location: Estonia
- Coordinates: 58°00′00″N 26°44′35″E
- Max. length: 2,080 meters (6,820 ft)
- Surface area: 65.3 hectares (161 acres)
- Average depth: 7.5 meters (25 ft)
- Max. depth: 25.5 meters (84 ft)
- Water volume: 4,703,000 cubic meters (166,100,000 cu ft)
- Shore length^{1}: 5,210 meters (17,090 ft)
- Surface elevation: 115.9 meters (380 ft)
- ^{1} Shore length is not a well-defined measure.

Lake Jõksi (Estonian: Jõksi järv) is a lake in Estonia. It is located in the village of Jõksi in Kanepi Parish, Põlva County.

== Physical description ==
The lake has an area of 65.3 hectares (161 acres). The lake has an average depth of 7.5 meters (25 ft) and a maximum depth of 25.5 meters (84 ft). It is 2,080 meters (6,820 ft) long, and its shoreline measures 5,210 meters (17,090 ft). It has a volume of 4,703,000 cubic meters (166,100,000 cu ft).

== Nature conservation ==
Lake Jõksi was included in the Lake Jõksi Conservation Area (Estonian: Jõksi järve hoiuala) in 2005. The conservation area was established to protect Lake Jõksi as a naturally nutrient-rich lake.

== See also ==
- List of lakes of Estonia
