= Jaan Pakk (conductor) =

Estonian conductor

- Born: November 26, 1901; Kallukse, Russian Empire (present-day Estonia)
- Died: December 8, 1979 (aged 78) Rakvere, then part of Estonian SSR, Soviet Union
- Occupations: Choral conductor, music teacher

Jaan Pakk (26 November 1901 – 8 December 1979) was a noted Estonian choral conductor and music teacher. Born in the village of Kallukse, he was awarded the Order of Lenin and various other awards of the Soviet Union. Aside from choral conducting, Jaan Pakk also conducted a wind orchestra in the town of Rakvere, which in the early 1950s featured one of his young students, Arvo Pärt, playing flute and oboe.

Pakk died in Rakvere twelve days past his 78th birthday. His bust, sculpted in 1992, is in the Rakvere gymnasium. A festival named after him that features young musicians has been held in Rakvere since 2002.

== Awards ==
- 1957: Honored Teacher of the Estonian SSR
