= Robert Rägastik =

Estonian geographer and educator (1902–1959)

- Born: November 1, 1902; Keila, Governorate of Estonia, Russian Empire
- Died: May 9, 1959 (aged 56); Tallinn, then part of Estonian SSR, Soviet Union
- Occupations: Geographer and educator

Robert Rägastik (November 1, 1902 – May 9, 1959) was an Estonian geographer and educator.

== Early life and education ==
Rägastik was born in Keila in the Governorate of Estonia, Russian Empire, the son of Juhan Rägastik (1861–?) and Louise Rosalie Trasmann (1865–?). He participated in the Estonian War of Independence. He graduated from Jakob Westholm High School in 1921, and from 1922 to 1933 he studied at the Faculty of Mathematics and Natural Sciences at the University of Tartu, where he graduated cum laude. Academically, he was a member of the Concordia student society.

== Career ==
Rägastik was a teacher at Otepää Private High School, Paldiski High School, Anna Tõrvand-Tellmann English College, Gustav Adolf High School, and Evening College. From 1940 to 1941, he was the director of Viljandi High School No. 1. In 1941, he evacuated to the rear of the USSR, where he was the director of a school in Verkhneuralsk with Estonian as the language of instruction. From 1947 to 1950, he was the director of the Estonian SSR Teacher Training Institute, and he became a member of the Communist Party in 1947. From 1952 to 1958, he was a lecturer and department head at Tallinn Pedagogical University. He wrote geography textbooks. In 1955, he was a founding member of the Estonian Geographical Society (Estonian: Eesti Geograafia Selts).

Rägastik died in Tallinn in 1959 and is buried at Metsakalmistu.

== Awards ==
- 1945: Order of the Badge of Honor
- 1947: Honored Teacher of the Estonian SSR
