= Arnold Kask =

Estonian linguist

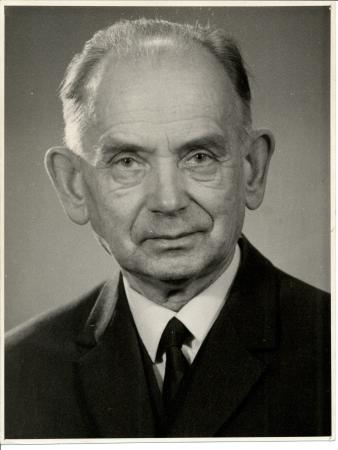
Arnold Kask

Arnold Kask (10 August 1902, Pärnu – 30 July 1994, Tartu) was an Estonian linguist.

In 1928 he graduated from the University of Tartu. Since 1944 he taught at the University of Tartu.

In 1944 and from 1968 to 1982, he was the chairman of Mother Tongue Society. Since 1961 he was a member of Estonian Academy of Sciences.

His main fields of research were Estonian dialects, Estonian literary language and its history.

== Awards ==
- 1959: Soviet Estonian Prize
- 1964: Honored Teacher of the Estonian SSR
- 1985: Meritorious Scientist of the Estonian SSR
- 1985: Estonian SSR State Prize (1985)

== Works ==
- J. V. Veski ja eesti oskussõnastikud 3–5 (1938)
- Eesti keel ja selle arenemine (1946)
- Lühike ülevaade eesti keelest ja selle arenemisest (1949)
- Eesti murrete kujunemisest ja rühmitusest // Eesti rahva etnilisest ajaloost (1956)
- 15 aastat nõukogude eesti keeleteadust // Emakeele Seltsi aastaraamat 2 (1956)
- 40 aastat Emakeele Seltsi // Emakeele Seltsi aastaraamat 6 (1960)
- Eesti kirjakeele murdelise tausta kujunemisest (1962)
- Valimik eesti murdenäiteid (1962; 1980)
- Eesti keele grammatika I: häälikuõpetus ja ortograafia (1964, co-author)
- Eesti keele ajalooline grammatika I: häälikulugu (1967)
- "Eesti õigekeelsuse-sõnaraamatu" osast meie kirjakeele kujunemisel // Emakeele Seltsi aastaraamat 14/15 (1969)
- Pool sajandit Emakeele Seltsi // Emakeele Seltsi aastaraamat 16 (1970)
- Eesti kirjakeele ajaloost I–II (1970)
- J. V. Veski tööst Tartu ülikoolis // Emakeele Seltsi aastaraamat 19/20 (1975)
- Eesti murded ja kirjakeel (1984)
