= Parakhino =

Parakhino Парахино
- Village
- Location within Vladimir Oblast Location within Russia
- Coordinates: 55°17′N 40°47′E
- Country: Russia
- Region: Vladimir Oblast
- District: Gus-Khrustalny District
- Time zone: UTC+3:00

Parakhino (Russian: Пара́хино) is a rural locality (a village) in Ulyakhinskoye Rural Settlement, Gus-Khrustalny District, Vladimir Oblast, Russia. The population was 137 as of 2010.

== Geography ==
Parakhino is located 52 km south of Gus-Khrustalny (the district's administrative centre) by road. Fomino is the nearest rural locality.
