= Ellerhein =

Estonian girl's choir

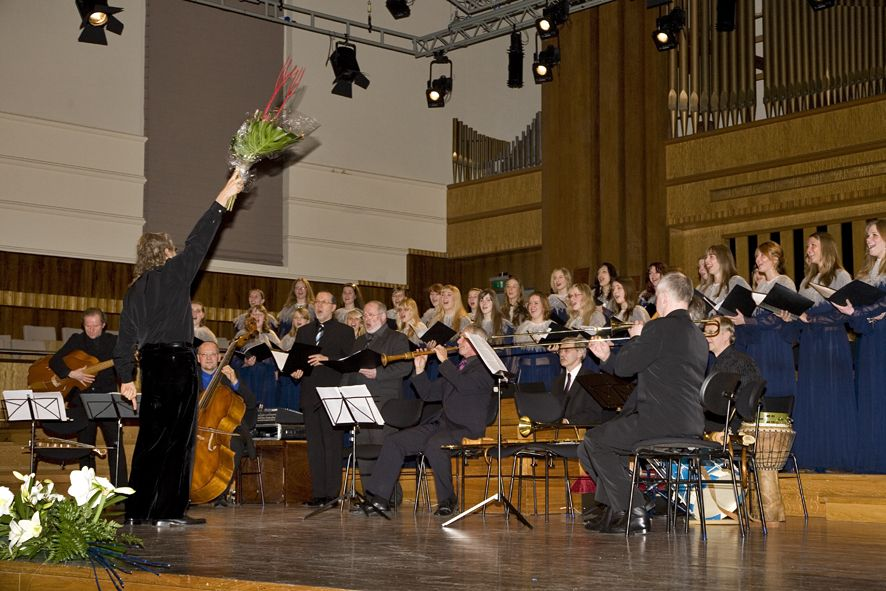
Ellerhein and Hortus Musicus in 2008

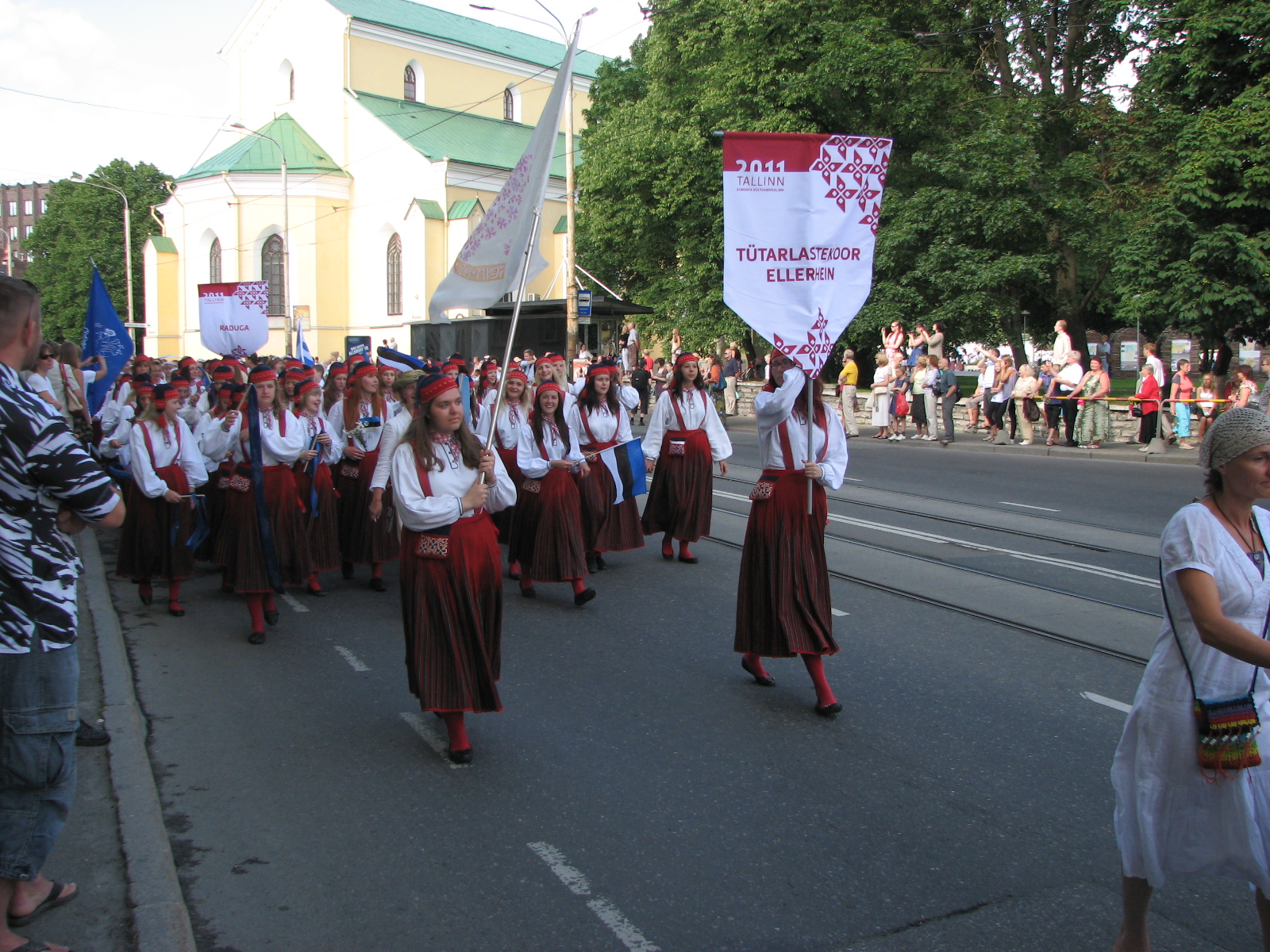
Ellerhein in 2011

Ellerhein is an Estonian girl's choir.

== History ==
Ellerhein's predecessor was the Tallinn Children's Choir, which was founded in 1951 by Heino Kaljuste. In 1969, the choir was renamed Ellerhein. From 1989 to 2012, the choir's principal conductor was Tiia-Ester Loitme. Since 2012, the principal conductor has been Ingrid Kõrvits. Today, the choir organization encompasses three choirs: a young children's choir (ages 7–10), a children's choir (ages 11–13), and a girls' choir (ages 14–18). Since 2003, the choir has been a member of the European Federation of Young Choirs Europa Cantat.

== Awards ==
- 2003: Annual Prize of the Estonian Cultural Endowment
- 2004: Grammy Award
