= Laiksaare =

Village in Pärnu County, Estonia

Coordinates: 58°05′59″N 24°41′20″E

- Village
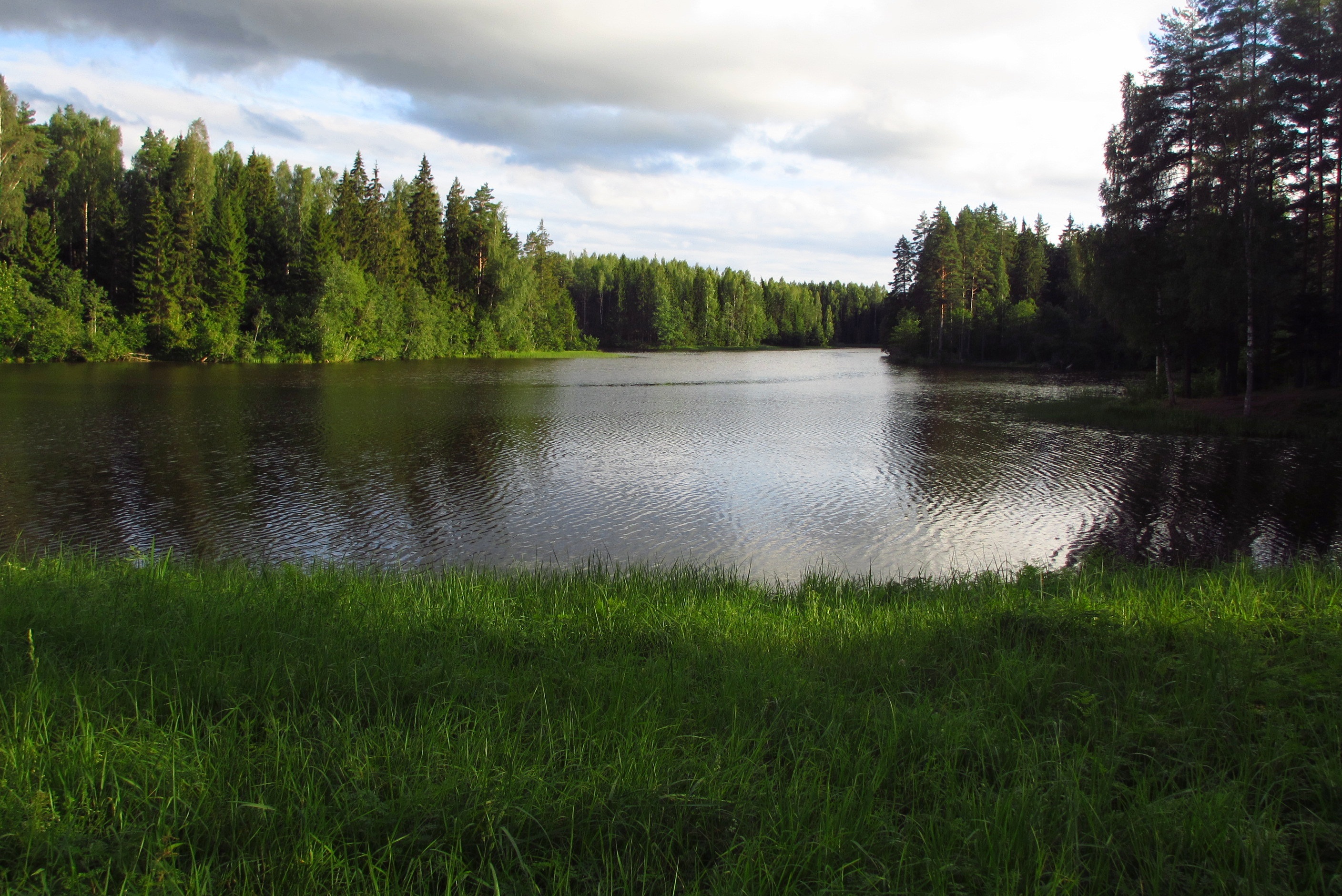
- Lake Rae in Laiksaare.
- Interactive map of Laiksaare
- Country: Estonia
- County: Pärnu County
- Parish: Saarde Parish
- Time zone: UTC+2 (EET)
  - Summer (DST): UTC+3 (EEST)

Laiksaare is a village in Saarde Parish, Pärnu County in southwestern Estonia.

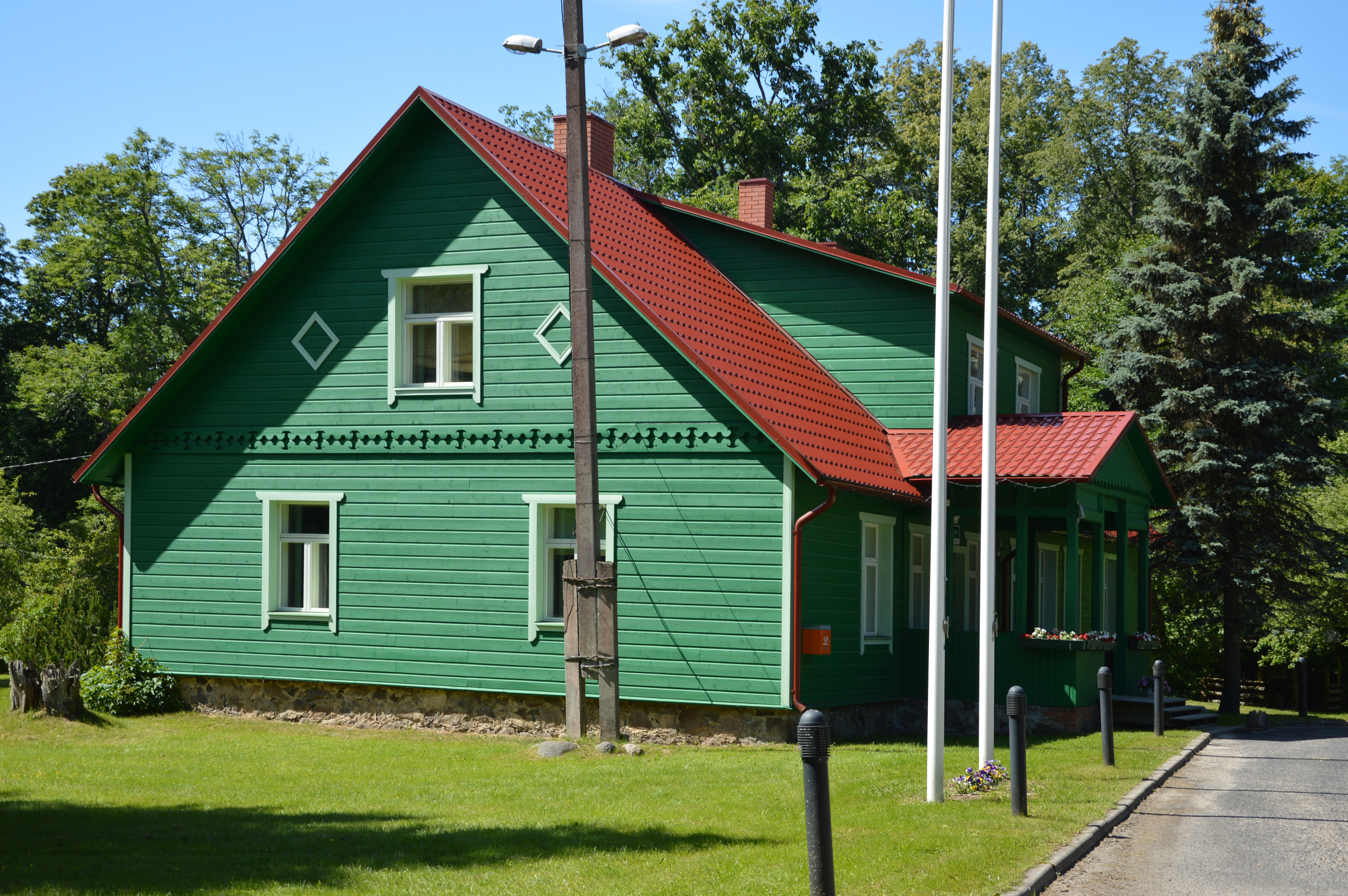
State Forest Management Centre (RMK), local office in Laiksaare

== Notable people ==
- Villem Orav (1883-1952), Estonian historian, teacher, and scholar of pedagogy
