= Tiia-Ester Loitme =

Estonian conductor

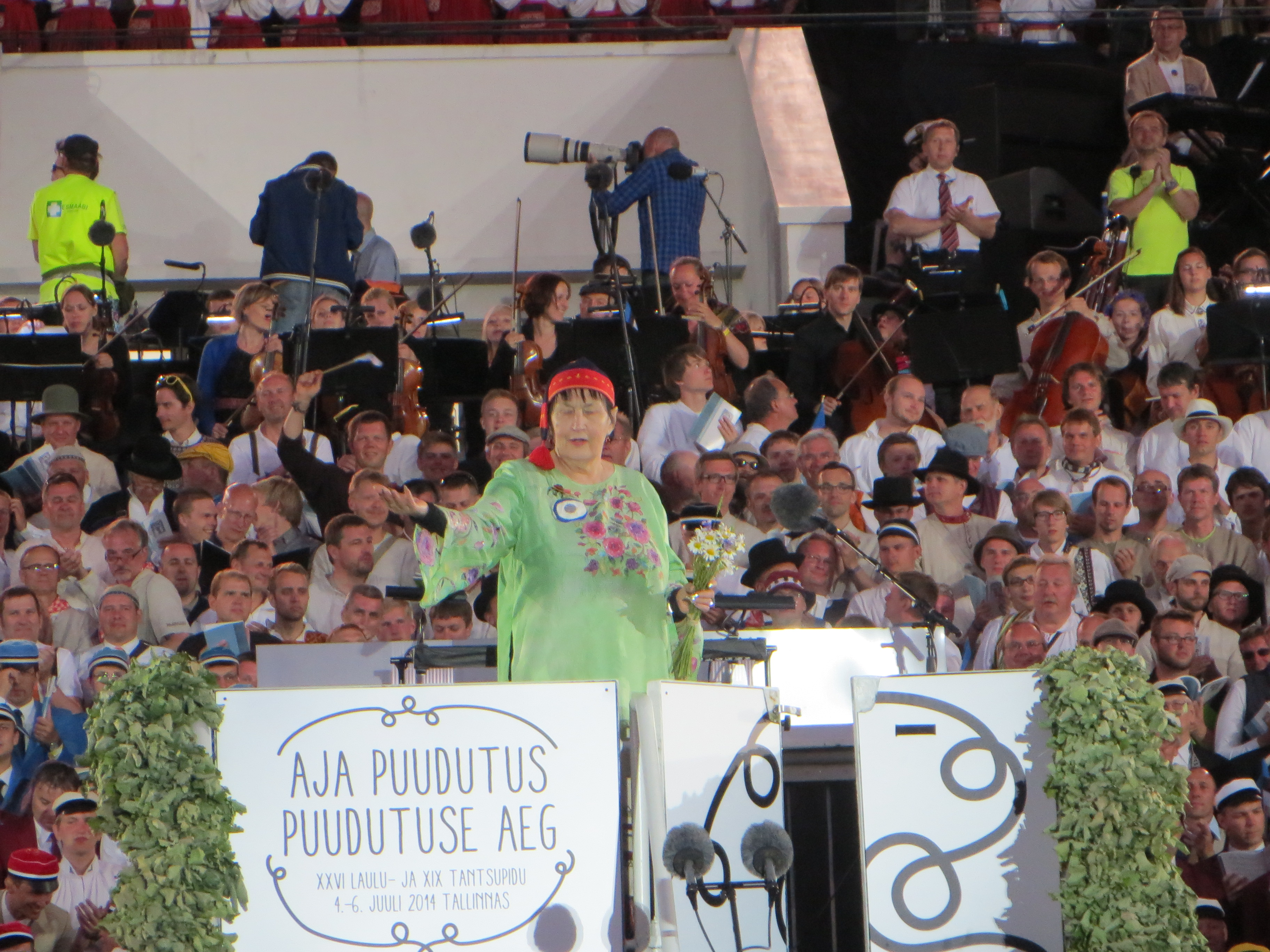
Loitme conducting at the 26th Estonian Song Festival in 2014

Tiia-Ester Loitme (born 19 December 1933 in Tallinn) is an Estonian conductor.

== Life and career ==
From 1944 to 1949 she studied piano at a local music school (part of the Tallinn State Conservatory). In 1949 she and her family were deported to Siberia. In 1956 she returned to Estonia. In 1965 she graduated from the Tallinn State Conservatory in choir conducting.

From 1965 to 1975 and again from 1987 to 2006 she worked as a music teacher and choir conductor at Tallinn English College.

Since 1970 she has been the conductor of the Ellerhein girls' choir.

== Awards ==
- 1987: Honored Teacher of the Estonian SSR
