= Kalju Teras =

Estonian educator

- Born: November 24, 1922; Rõngu Parish, Estonia
- Died: November 14, 1990 (aged 67); Põltsamaa, Estonia
- Education: Hugo Treffner Gymnasium
- Awards: People's Teacher of the USSR

Kalju Teras (November 24, 1922 – November 14, 1990) was an Estonian educator. He attended Hugo Treffner Gymnasium from 1936 to 1941. During World War II he served in the Red Army. In 1956, he graduated from Tallinn University. He was a member of the Estonian Nature Conservation Society. From 1967 to 1971 he was a member of the Supreme Soviet of the Estonian SSR. Heli Speek released a documentary film about Kalju Teras in 1987.

== Awards ==
- 1966: Honored Teacher of the Estonian SSR
- 1982: People's Teacher of the USSR
