= Enn Murdmaa =

Estonian politician (1874–1957)

Enn Murdmaa (also Ernst or Enn Martinson; 21 December 1874 Käru Parish (now Türi Parish), Kreis Pernau – 9 January 1957 Tallinn) was an Estonian politician. He was a member of I Riigikogu.

== Awards ==
- 1945: Honored Teacher of the Estonian SSR
