= Jõksi, Põlva County =

Village in Estonia

Coordinates: 58°00′14″N 26°43′32″E

Jõksi
- Village
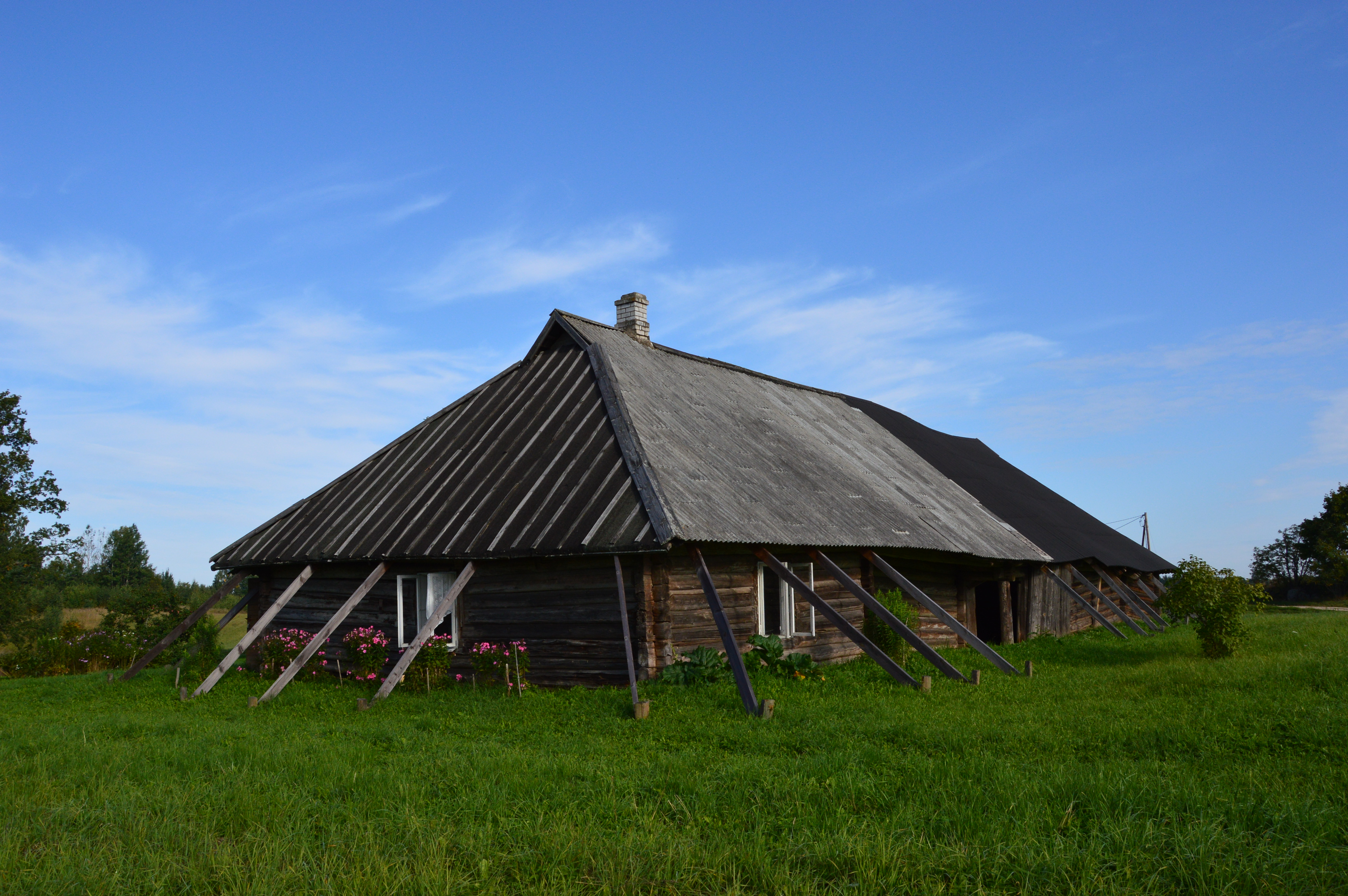
- Hinni farm complex
- Interactive map of Jõksi
- Country: Estonia
- County: Põlva County
- Parish: Kanepi Parish
- Time zone: UTC+2 (EET)
  - Summer (DST): UTC+3 (EEST)

Jõksi is a village in Kanepi Parish, Põlva County in southeastern Estonia.

== Notable people ==
Notable people that were born in Jõksi include the following:

- Erika Siilivask (1902–1993), pedagogue and school principal
