= Amicrocentrinae =

Scientific classification
- Domain: Eukaryota
- Kingdom: Animalia
- Phylum: Arthropoda
- Class: Insecta
- Order: Hymenoptera
- Family: Braconidae
- Subfamily: Amicrocentrinae; Schulz, 1912

Genera
- Amicrocentrum; Platyxanion

Subfamily of wasps

The Amicrocentrinae are a subfamily of braconid parasitoid wasps. Members of this subfamily were previously included in the Macrocentrinae.

== Description and distribution ==
Amicrocentrinae are relatively large yellow or brown non-cyclostome braconids.

This subfamily is found in Madagascar and continental Africa.

== Biology ==
Some species within Amicrocentrinae are known to be parasitoids of large caterpillars which bore into plant stalks.
