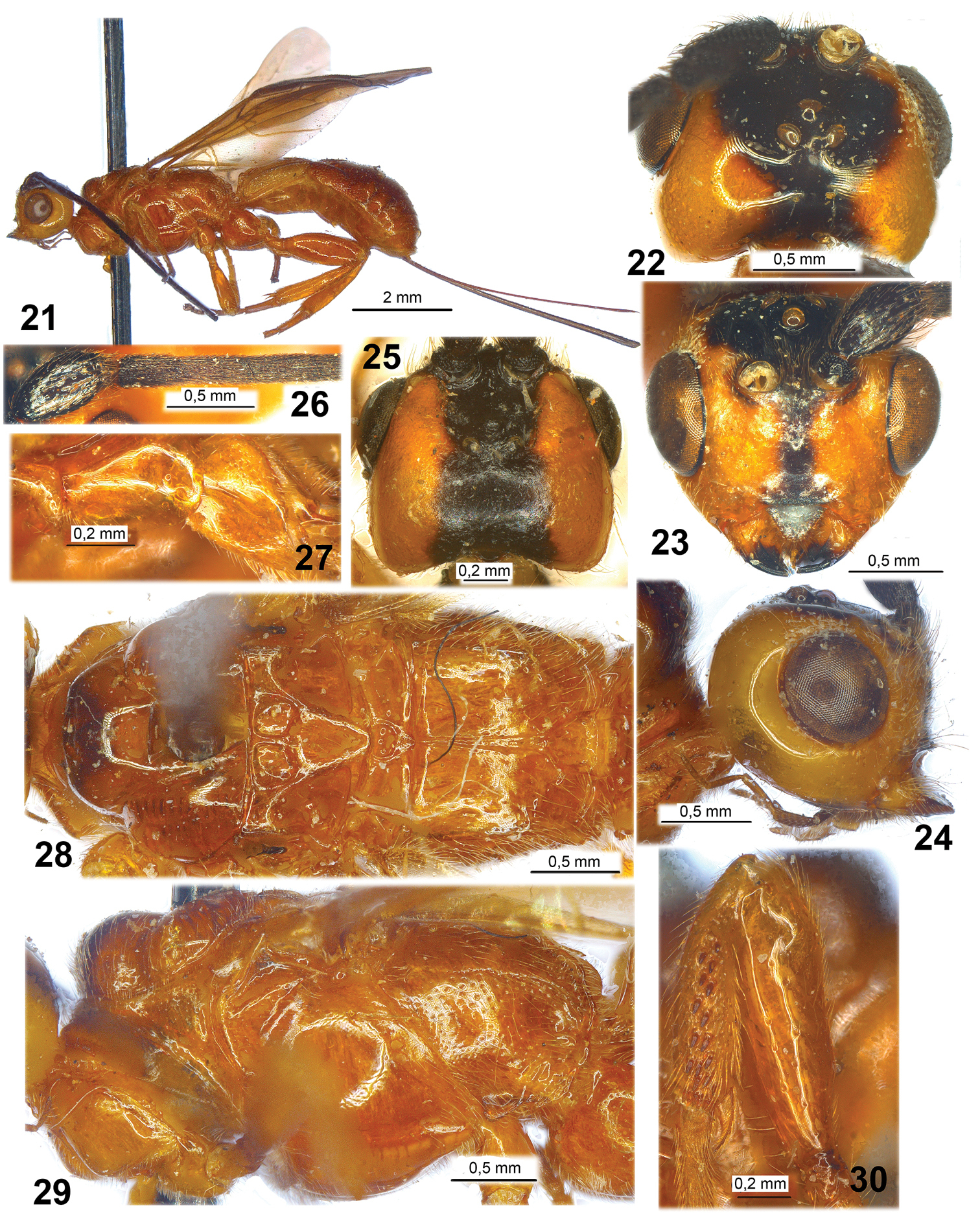

Scientific classification
- Kingdom: Animalia
- Phylum: Arthropoda
- Class: Insecta
- Order: Hymenoptera
- Family: Braconidae
- Genus: Ivondrovia
- Species: I. seyrigi

Binomial name
- Ivondrovia seyrigi (Granger, 1949)

Synonyms
- Lophogaster seyrigi Granger, 1949

= Ivondrovia seyrigi =

Species of wasp

Ivondrovia seyrigi is a species of parasitoid wasp belonging to the subfamily Doryctinae of the family Braconidae. It is endemic to Madagascar.

== Description ==
Body length of female is 9.7 mm. Head smooth, high and transverse. Occiput strongly concave. Ocelli arranged in slightly obtuse triangle. Frons slightly concave. Eyes glabrous. Clypeus almost flat laterally. No malar suture. Blackish antennae weakly setiform with 35 segments. Mesosoma not depressed. Pterostigma of fore wing rather narrow. Fore femur thick and short. Claws are simple, large, short and strongly curved. Mesosoma brownish yellow and metasoma light reddish brown. Yellowish head with large black spot on frons. Legs brownish yellow to light reddish brown. Fore and hind wings are entirely distinctly infuscate with yellowish tint basally.
