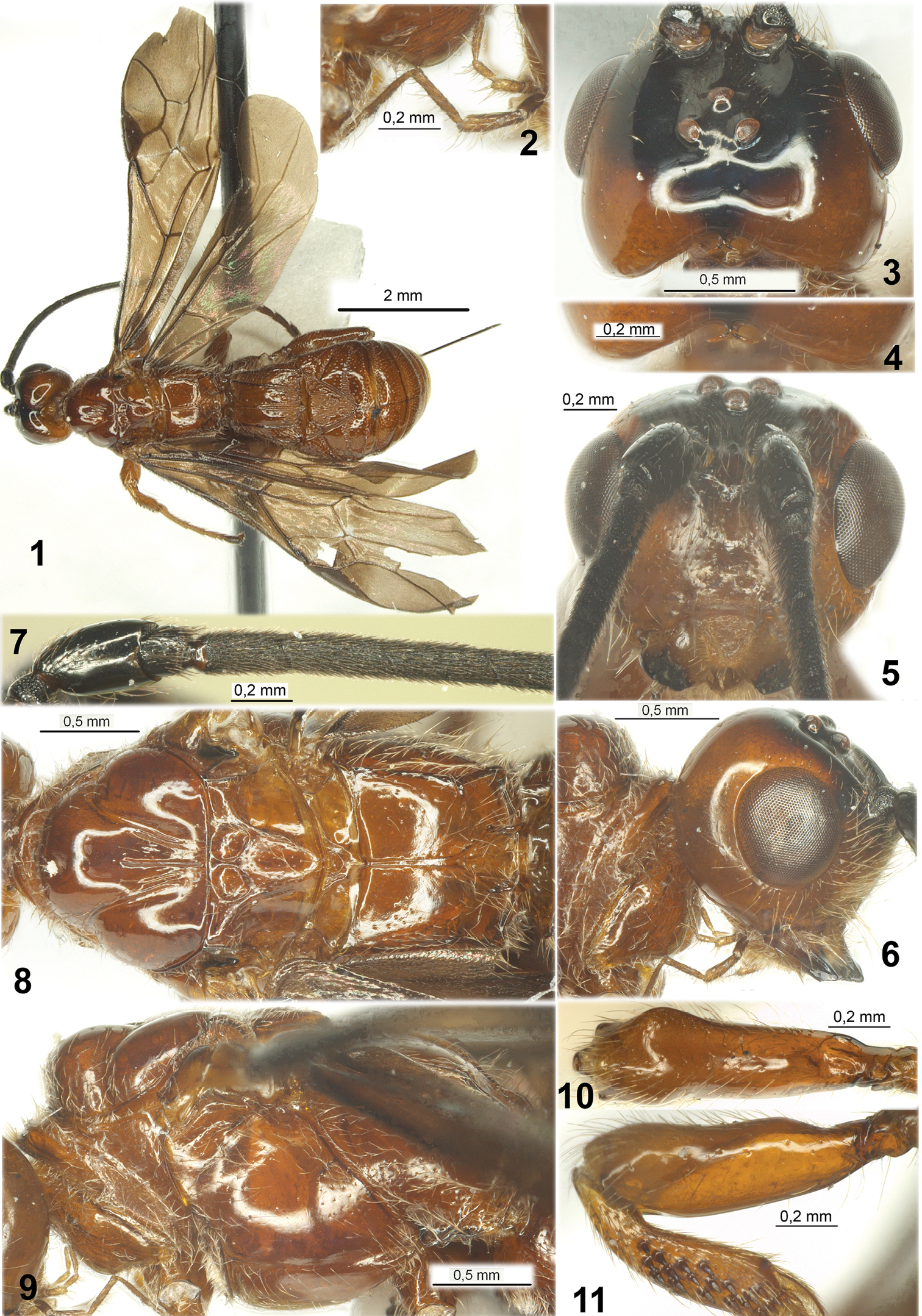

Scientific classification
- Kingdom: Animalia
- Phylum: Arthropoda
- Clade: Pancrustacea
- Class: Insecta
- Order: Hymenoptera
- Family: Braconidae
- Genus: Ivondrovia
- Species: I. grangeri

Binomial name
- Ivondrovia grangeri Belokobylskij, Sergey, Zaldivar-Riveron, Alejandro & Castaneda-Osorio, Ruben, 2018

= Ivondrovia grangeri =

Species of wasp

Ivondrovia grangeri is a species of parasitoid wasp belonging to the subfamily Doryctinae of the family Braconidae. It is endemic to Kenya.

== Description ==
Body length of female is 7.3–7.9 mm. Head smooth, high and transverse. Occiput distinctly concave. Ocelli arranged in slightly obtuse triangle. Frons slightly concave. Eyes glabrous. Clypeus almost flat laterally. No malar suture. Blackish antennae thickened, almost filiform with 51 segments. Mesosoma not depressed. Pterostigma of fore wing rather narrow. Fore femur thick and short. Claws are simple, large, short and strongly curved. Body light reddish brown. Head with large black spot on frons. Legs light reddish brown or partly reddish brown. Fore and hind wings are entirely distinctly infuscate with yellowish tinge on them.
