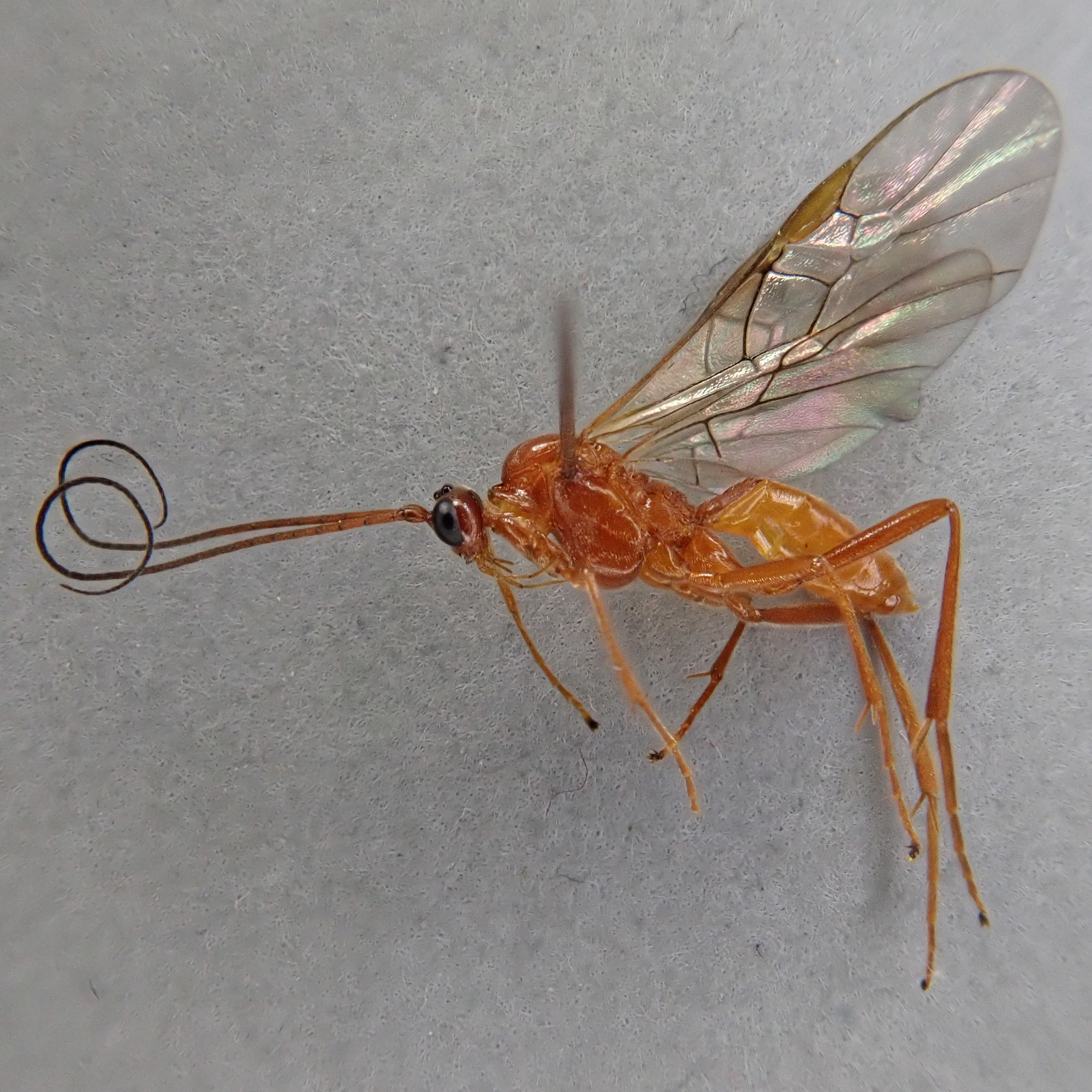

Scientific classification
- Kingdom: Animalia
- Phylum: Arthropoda
- Clade: Pancrustacea
- Class: Insecta
- Order: Hymenoptera
- Family: Braconidae
- Tribe: Homolobini
- Genus: Homolobus; Förster, 1862

= Homolobus =

Genus of insects

Homolobus is a genus of insects belonging to the family Braconidae.

== Description and identification ==
Homolobus are moderate to large braconids with a body length ranging from 4.4 to 14.6 mm. They have long tibial spurs like the Macrocentrinae but differ in having an occipital carina and shorter, nearly square submarginal cell. The ovipositor is usually very short and hardly extending beyond the apex of the gaster except in species like Homolobus armatus, wherein the ovipositor is 0.77 times the length of the forewing. Many species are testaceous and have large ocelli.

They are separated from the allied Exasticolus in having vein (Rs+M)a straight rather than curved.

== Distribution ==
The genus has a cosmopolitan distribution.

== Behavior ==
Homolobus are endoparasitoids of caterpillars, particularly of the families Noctuidae and Geometridae.

== Taxonomy and phylogeny ==
Homolobus is classified within the tribe Homolobini along with Exasticolus. The tribe Homolobini is sister to Westwoodiellini, containing only Westwoodiella. The two tribes Homolobini and Westwoodiellini comprise the subfamily Homolobinae.

== Species ==
There are roughly 55 species of Homolobus divided into 5 subgenera:

- Homolobus pallidus
- Homolobus sungkangensis Chou & Hsu, 1995

=== Subgenus Homolobus (Apatia) Enderlein, 1918 ===
- Homolobus australiensis (Nixon, 1938)
- Homolobus albipalpis (Granger, 1949)
- Homolobus alternipes van Achterberg, 1979
- Homolobus arabicus Ghramh, 2012
- Homolobus elagabalus (Nixon, 1938)
- Homolobus huddlestoni van Achterberg, 1979
- Homolobus indicus Ahmad & Shuja-Uddin, 2001
- Homolobus lacteiceps van Achterberg, 1979
- Homolobus madeirensis van Achterberg & Aguiar, 2009
- Homolobus maculatus van Achterberg, 1979
- Homolobus ophioninus (Vachal, 1907)
- Homolobus palidistigmus (Cameron, 1911)
- Homolobus priapus (Nixon, 1938)
- Homolobus pulchricornis (Nixon, 1938)
- Homolobus rufithorax (Granger, 1949)
- Homolobus truncatoides van Achterberg, 1979
- Homolobus truncator (Say, 1828)

=== Subgenus Homolobus (Chartolobus) van Achterberg, 1979 ===
- Homolobus infumator (Lyle, 1914)
- Homolobus nigritarsis van Achterberg, 1979
- Homolobus stevestroudi Sharkey, 2009
- Homolobus undulatus van Achterberg, 1979

=== Subgenus Homolobus (Homolobus) Förster, 1862 ===
- Homolobus cingulatus (Granger, 1949)
- Homolobus discolor (Wesmael, 1835)
- Homolobus dauricus Shestakov, 1940
- Homolobus ethiopicus van Achterberg, 1979
- Homolobus inopinus van Achterberg, 1979
- Homolobus luteifasciatus Mateo, 1982
- Homolobus rufiventralis Mateo, 1982
- Homolobus rugosus van Achterberg, 1979
- Homolobus simplex (Watanabe, 1932)
- Homolobus sinensis Chen,1991

=== Subgenus Homolobus (Oulophus) van Achterberg, 1979 ===
- Homolobus acares van Achterberg, 1979
- Homolobus annulatus van Achterberg, 1979
- Homolobus antefurcalis van Achterberg, 1979
- Homolobus armatus van Achterberg, 1979
- Homolobus bicolor van Achterberg, 1979
- Homolobus bohemani (Bengtsson, 1918)
- Homolobus carbonator (Shestakov, 1940)
- Homolobus crenulatus van Achterberg, 1979
- Homolobus flagitator (Curtis, 1837)
- Homolobus fuscinervis van Achterberg & Shaw, 2009
- Homolobus hirashimai Maeto, 1982
- Homolobus intermedius van Achterberg, 1992
- Homolobus macropterus van Achterberg, 1979
- Homolobus mesoxiphius van Achterberg, 1979
- Homolobus nepalensis van Achterberg, 1979
- Homolobus nipponensis van Achterberg, 1979
- Homolobus obscurus van Achterberg, 1979
- Homolobus occidentalis van Achterberg, 1979
- Homolobus rectinervis van Achterberg, 1979

=== Subgenus Homolobus (Phylacter) Reinhard, 1863 ===
- Homolobus annulicornis (Nees, 1834)
- Homolobus bifurcatus van Achterberg, 1979
- Homolobus kahonoi van Achterberg, 1992
- Homolobus meridionalis van Achterberg, 1979

=== Subgenus incertae sedis ===
- †Homolobus rasnitsyni Belokobylskij, 2014
