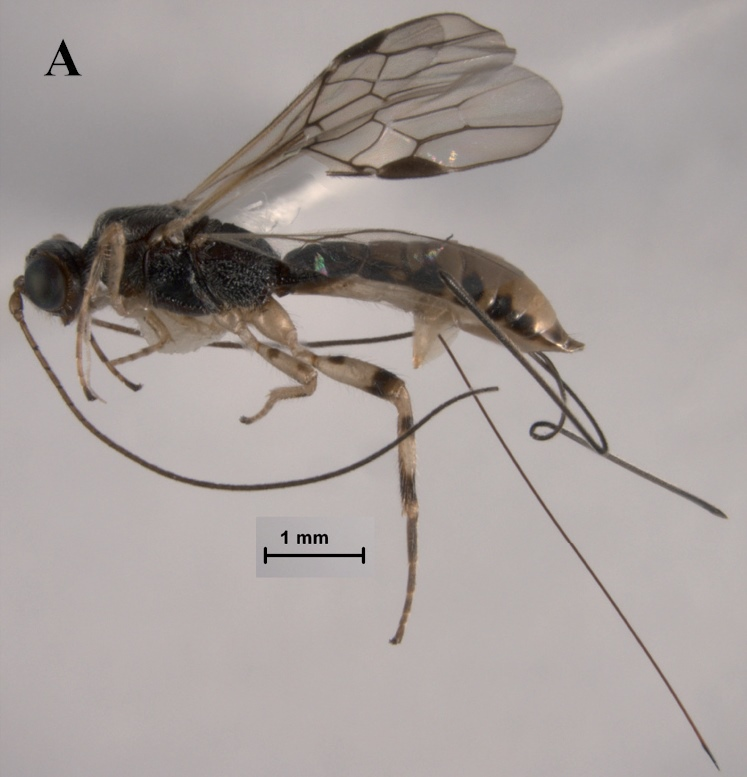
- Ondigus cuixmalensis

Scientific classification
- Kingdom: Animalia
- Phylum: Arthropoda
- Class: Insecta
- Order: Hymenoptera
- Family: Braconidae
- Subfamily: Doryctinae
- Genus: Ondigus; Braet, Barbalho & van Achterberg, 2003

= Ondigus =

Genus of insects

Ondigus is a genus of wasp in the family Braconidae. There are at least two described species in Ondigus, found in Mexico and Central America.

== Species ==
These two species belong to the genus Ondigus:

- Ondigus bicolor Braet, Barbalho & van Achterberg, 2003
- Ondigus cuixmalensis Zaldívar-Riverón, Martinez, Ceccarelli & Shaw, 2012
