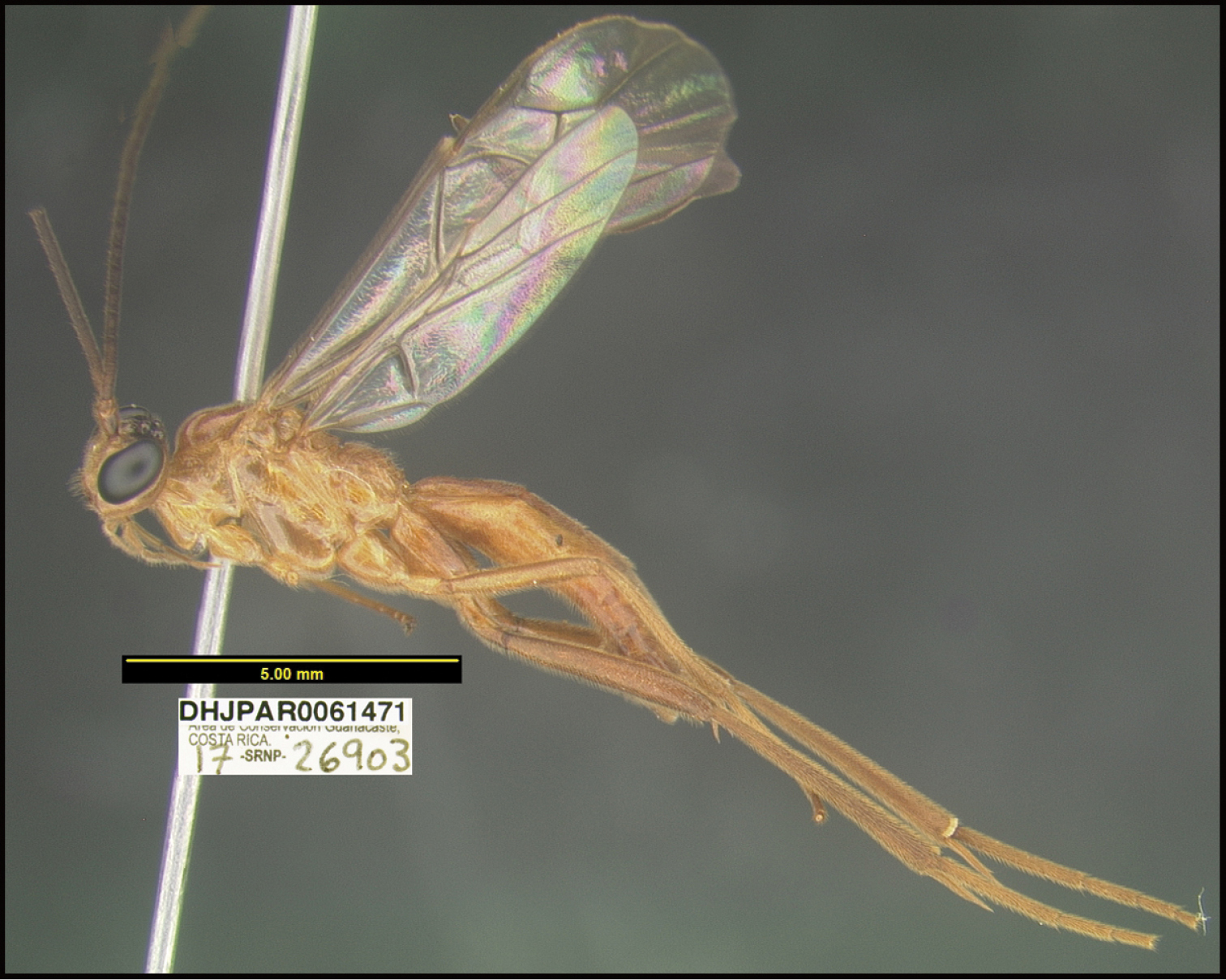
- Exasticolus sigifredomarini

Scientific classification
- Domain: Eukaryota
- Kingdom: Animalia
- Phylum: Arthropoda
- Class: Insecta
- Order: Hymenoptera
- Family: Braconidae
- Subfamily: Homolobinae

= Homolobinae =

Subfamily of wasps

The Homolobinae are a subfamily of braconid parasitoid wasps.

== Taxonomy and phylogeny ==
The subfamily Charmontinae was previously included within Homolobinae as the tribe Charmontini.

== Description and identification ==
Homolobines are relatively large braconids, often resembling species of Macrocentrinae. They have non-cyclostome mouth parts. Many are pale in coloration with large eyes and long tibial spurs on the hind leg. They can be separated from macrocentrines by the presence of an occipital carina, which is a ridge along the back of the head.

== Biology ==
Homolobines are koinobiont endoparasitoids of caterpillars. Females lay a single egg on each host. Most recorded hosts are in the families Noctuidae and Geometridae. Most species of Homolobinae are nocturnal.

== Genera ==
There are 3 genera of Homolobinae, which are arranged as follows:

=== Tribe Homolobini van Achterberg, 1979 ===
- Exasticolus van Achterberg, 1979
- Homolobus Förster, 1863

=== Westwoodiellini van Achterberg, 1992 ===
- Westwoodiella Szépligeti, 1904
