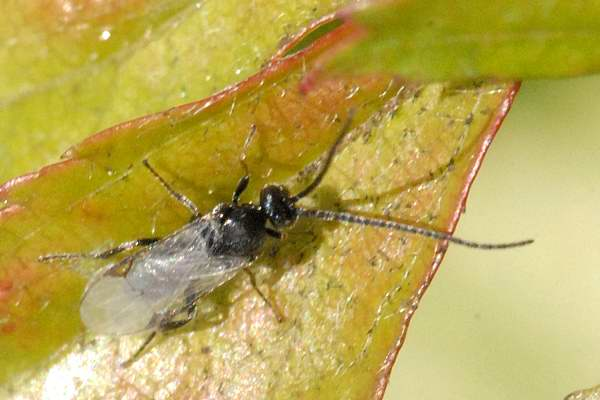
- Diachasma caffer

Scientific classification
- Domain: Eukaryota
- Kingdom: Animalia
- Phylum: Arthropoda
- Class: Insecta
- Order: Hymenoptera
- Family: Braconidae
- Subfamily: Opiinae
- Genus: Diachasma; Förster, 1862

= Diachasma =

Genus of wasps

Diachasma is a genus of the Opiinae subfamily of insects and is characterized by the lack of a carapace-like metasoma and clypeal structures that other opiines share.

== Species ==
Species include:

- Diachasma alloeum
- Diachasma anguma
- Diachasma australe
- Diachasma caffer
- Diachasma dentatum
- Diachasma extasis
- Diachasma ferrugineum
- Diachasma fulgidum
- Diachasma gressitti
- Diachasma muliebre
- Diachasma obothorax
- Diachasma tasmaniae
