= List of Macrocentrus species =

This is a list of 189 species in Macrocentrus, a genus of wasp in the family Braconidae.

== Macrocentrus species ==
- Macrocentrus aegeriae Rohwer, 1915^{c g b}
- Macrocentrus affinis Muesebeck, 1932^{c g}
- Macrocentrus albitarsis Granger, 1949^{c g}
- Macrocentrus alox van Achterberg & Belokobylskij, 1987^{c g}
- Macrocentrus amphigenes Alexeev, 1971^{c g}
- Macrocentrus amploventralis He & Chen, 2000^{c g}
- Macrocentrus ancylivora Rohwer, 1923^{c g}
- Macrocentrus angustatus (Enderlein, 1920)^{c g}
- Macrocentrus angustifacialis Granger, 1949^{c g}
- Macrocentrus anjiensis He & Chen, 2000^{c g}
- Macrocentrus annulicornis Cameron, 1911^{c}
- Macrocentrus apicalis He & Chen, 2000^{c g}
- Macrocentrus archipsivorus He & Chen, 2000^{c g}
- Macrocentrus arcipetiolatus Lou & He, 2000^{c g}
- Macrocentrus argyroploceus Fischer, 1964^{c g}
- Macrocentrus asiaticus Belokobylskij, 2000^{c g}
- Macrocentrus atratus Muesebeck, 1932^{c g}
- Macrocentrus austrinus He & Chen, 2000^{c g}
- Macrocentrus baishanzua He & Chen, 2000^{c g}
- Macrocentrus beijingensis Lou & He, 2000^{c g}
- Macrocentrus bengtssoni (Fahringer, 1929)^{c g}
- Macrocentrus bicolor Curtis, 1833^{c}
- Macrocentrus bimaculatus He & Chen, 2000^{c g}
- Macrocentrus blandoides van Achterberg, 1993^{c g}
- Macrocentrus blandus Eady & Clark, 1964^{c g}
- Macrocentrus bradleyi Daniel, 1933^{c g}
- Macrocentrus brevicaudifer van Achterberg, 1979^{c g}
- Macrocentrus brevipalpis He & Chen, 2000^{c g}
- Macrocentrus buolianae Eady & Clark, 1964^{c g}
- Macrocentrus calacte Nixon, 1938^{c g}
- Macrocentrus californiensis Ahlstrom, 2005^{c g}
- Macrocentrus canarsiae Muesebeck, 1932^{c g}
- Macrocentrus capensis Cameron, 1906^{c g}
- Macrocentrus carolinensis Watanabe, 1945^{c g}
- Macrocentrus cerasivoranae Viereck, 1912^{c g}
- Macrocentrus ceylonicus Enderlein, 1912^{c g}
- Macrocentrus chasanicus Belokobylskij, 2000^{c g}
- Macrocentrus choui He & Chen, 2000^{c g}
- Macrocentrus chui Lou & He, 2000^{c g}
- Macrocentrus cingulum Brischke, 1882^{c g}
- Macrocentrus citreitarsis (Enderlein, 1920)^{c g}
- Macrocentrus clypeatus Muesebeck, 1932^{c g}
- Macrocentrus cnaphalocrocis He & Lou, 1993^{c g}
- Macrocentrus collaris (Spinola, 1808)^{c g}
- Macrocentrus coloradensis Ahlstrom, 2005^{c g}
- Macrocentrus concentralis He & Chen, 2000^{c g}
- Macrocentrus confusstriatus He & Chen, 2000^{c g}
- Macrocentrus coronarius Lou & He, 2000^{c g}
- Macrocentrus crambi (Ashmead, 1894)^{c g}
- Macrocentrus crassinervis Nixon, 1950^{c g}
- Macrocentrus crassipes Muesebeck, 1932^{c g}
- Macrocentrus crassus Eady & Clark, 1964^{c g}
- Macrocentrus crocidophorae Muesebeck, 1932^{c g}
- Macrocentrus cuniculus Walley, 1933^{c g}
- Macrocentrus dushanensis He & Chen, 2000^{c g}
- Macrocentrus elongatus Granger, 1949^{c g}
- Macrocentrus equalis Lyle, 1914^{c g}
- Macrocentrus exartemae Walley, 1932^{c g}
- Macrocentrus famelicus (Enderlein, 1920)^{c g}
- Macrocentrus flavomaculatus Lou & He, 2000^{c g}
- Macrocentrus flavoorbitalis He & Chen, 2000^{c g}
- Macrocentrus flavus Vollenhoven, 1878^{c g}
- Macrocentrus fossilipetiolatus Lou & He, 2000^{c g}
- Macrocentrus fuscicornis Szepligeti, 1914^{c g}
- Macrocentrus fuscipes Cameron, 1906^{c g}
- Macrocentrus gibber Eady & Clark, 1964^{c g}
- Macrocentrus giganteus Granger, 1949^{c g}
- Macrocentrus gigas Watanabe, 1937^{c g}
- Macrocentrus glabripleuralis Lou & He, 2000^{c g}
- Macrocentrus glabritergitus He & Chen, 2000^{c g}
- Macrocentrus guangxiensis He & Chen, 2000^{c g}
- Macrocentrus guizhouensis Lou & He, 2000^{c g}
- Macrocentrus gutianshanensis He & Chen, 2000^{c g}
- Macrocentrus hangzhouensis He & Chen, 2000^{c g}
- Macrocentrus hemistriolatus He & Chen, 2000^{c g}
- Macrocentrus homonae Nixon, 1938^{c g}
- Macrocentrus huggerti van Achterberg, 1993^{c g}
- Macrocentrus hunanensis He & Lou, 1992^{c g}
- Macrocentrus hungaricus Marshall, 1893^{c g}
- Macrocentrus impressus Muesebeck, 1932^{c g}
- Macrocentrus incompletus Muesebeck, 1932^{c g}
- Macrocentrus infirmus (Nees, 1834)^{c}
- Macrocentrus infumatus Muesebeck, 1938^{c g}
- Macrocentrus infuscatus van Achterberg, 1993^{c g}
- Macrocentrus innuitorum Walley, 1936^{c g}
- Macrocentrus instabilis Muesebeck, 1932^{c g}
- Macrocentrus jacobsoni Szépligeti, 1908^{c g}
- Macrocentrus karafutus Belokobylskij, 2000^{c g}
- Macrocentrus kurnakovi Tobias, 1976^{c g}
- Macrocentrus laevigatus He & Chen, 2000^{c g}
- Macrocentrus latisulcatus Cameron, 1911^{c g}
- Macrocentrus linearis (Nees, 1811)^{c g}
- Macrocentrus lishuiensis He & Chen, 2000^{c g}
- Macrocentrus longicornutus Haeselbarth, 1978^{c g}
- Macrocentrus longipes Cameron, 1910^{c g}
- Macrocentrus longistigmus He, 1997^{c g}
- Macrocentrus luteus Szepligeti, 1911^{c g}
- Macrocentrus maculistigmus He & Lou, 1992^{c g}
- Macrocentrus madeirensis van Achterberg, 1993^{c g}
- Macrocentrus mainlingensis Wang, 1982^{c g}
- Macrocentrus mandibularis Watanabe, 1967^{c g}
- Macrocentrus maraisi Nixon, 1956^{c g}
- Macrocentrus marginator (Nees, 1811)^{c g}
- Macrocentrus marshi Ahlstrom, 2005^{c g}
- Macrocentrus maximiliani Haeselbarth, 1994^{c g}
- Macrocentrus melanogaster He & Chen, 2000^{c g}
- Macrocentrus mellicornis van Achterberg & Belokobylskij, 1987^{c g}
- Macrocentrus mellipes Provancher, 1880^{c g}
- Macrocentrus minor Szépligeti, 1908^{c g}
- Macrocentrus muesebecki Costa Lima, 1950^{c g}
- Macrocentrus neomexicanus Ahlstrom, 2005^{c g}
- Macrocentrus nidulator (Nees, 1834)^{c g}
- Macrocentrus nigriceps Szepligeti, 1914^{c g}
- Macrocentrus nigricoxa He & Chen, 2000^{c g}
- Macrocentrus nigridorsis Viereck, 1924^{c g b}
- Macrocentrus nigrigenuis van Achterberg, 1993^{c g}
- Macrocentrus nigripectus Muesebeck, 1932^{c g}
- Macrocentrus nigroornatus Cameron, 1911^{c g}
- Macrocentrus nitidus (Wesmael, 1835)^{c g}
- Macrocentrus nixoni Kurhade & Nikam, 1998^{c g}
- Macrocentrus nocarus Ahlstrom, 2005^{c g}
- Macrocentrus novaguineensis Szepligeti, 1902^{c g}
- Macrocentrus obliquus He & Chen, 2000^{c g}
- Macrocentrus oculatus Szepligeti, 1914^{c g}
- Macrocentrus oriens van Achterberg & Belokobylskij, 1987^{c g}
- Macrocentrus orientalis He & Chen, 2000^{c g}
- Macrocentrus palliduplus Shenefelt, 1969^{c g}
- Macrocentrus pallidus Fullaway, 1913^{c g}
- Macrocentrus pallipes (Nees, 1811)^{c g}
- Macrocentrus pallisteri DeGant, 1930^{c g}
- Macrocentrus papuanus Strand, 1911^{c g}
- Macrocentrus parametriatesivorus He & Chen, 2000^{c g}
- Macrocentrus parki van Achterberg, 1993^{c g}
- Macrocentrus pectoralis Provancher, 1880^{c g}
- Macrocentrus peroneae Muesebeck, 1932^{c g}
- Macrocentrus persephone Nixon, 1950^{c g}
- Macrocentrus pilosus Watanabe, 1967^{c g}
- Macrocentrus planitibiae Ahlstrom, 2005^{c g}
- Macrocentrus postfurcalis Strand, 1911^{c g}
- Macrocentrus prolificus Wharton, 1984^{c g}
- Macrocentrus pryeri Song, Cao, Li, Yang & Chen, 2017^{g}
- Macrocentrus pulchripennis Muesebeck, 1932^{c g}
- Macrocentrus pyraustae Viereck, 1917^{c g}
- Macrocentrus qingyuanensis He & Chen, 2000^{c g}
- Macrocentrus radiellanus He & Chen, 2000^{c g}
- Macrocentrus resinellae (Linnaeus, 1758)^{c g}
- Macrocentrus reticulatus Muesebeck, 1932^{c g}
- Macrocentrus retusus van Achterberg & Belokobylskij, 1987^{c g}
- Macrocentrus rhyacioniae Watanabe, 1970^{c g}
- Macrocentrus robustus Muesebeck, 1932^{c g}
- Macrocentrus rossemi Haeselbarth & van Achterberg, 1981^{c g}
- Macrocentrus rubromaculatus (Cameron, 1901)^{c g}
- Macrocentrus rufotestaceus Cameron, 1906^{c g}
- Macrocentrus rugifacialis He & Chen, 2000^{c g}
- Macrocentrus rugulosus Szepligeti, 1914^{c g}
- Macrocentrus seminiger Muesebeck, 1932^{c g}
- Macrocentrus sesamivorus van Achterberg, 1996^{c g}
- Macrocentrus seyrigi Granger, 1949^{c g}
- Macrocentrus shawi Ahlstrom, 2005^{c g}
- Macrocentrus sichuanensis He, 1997^{c g}
- Macrocentrus simingshanus Lou & He, 2000^{c g}
- Macrocentrus sinensis He & Chen, 2000^{c g}
- Macrocentrus somaliensis (Szepligeti, 1914)^{c g}
- Macrocentrus soniae Ahlstrom, 2005^{c g}
- Macrocentrus spilotus van Achterberg & Belokobylskij, 1987^{c g}
- Macrocentrus sulphureus Szepligeti, 1914^{c g}
- Macrocentrus suni He & Chen, 2000^{c g}
- Macrocentrus sylvestrellae van Achterberg, 2001^{c g}
- Macrocentrus tasmanicus (Wilkinson, 1928)^{c g}
- Macrocentrus tatshinguanus Belokobylskij, 2000^{c g}
- Macrocentrus terminalis (Ashmead, 1889)^{c g}
- Macrocentrus tessulatanae Hedwig, 1959^{c g}
- Macrocentrus testaceiceps Szepligeti, 1914^{c g}
- Macrocentrus theaphilus He & Chen, 2000^{c g}
- Macrocentrus thoracicus (Nees, 1811)^{c}
- Macrocentrus tianmushanus He & Chen, 2000^{c g}
- Macrocentrus townesi van Achterberg & Haeselbarth, 1983^{c g}
- Macrocentrus tricoloratus Turner, 1920^{c g}
- Macrocentrus trimaculatus (Cameron, 1910)^{c g}
- Macrocentrus tritergitus He & Chen, 2000^{c g}
- Macrocentrus turkestanicus (Telenga, 1950)^{c g}
- Macrocentrus utilis Muesebeck, 1932^{c g}
- Macrocentrus vanachterbergi Ahlstrom, 2005^{c g}
- Macrocentrus wangi He & Chen, 2000^{c g}
- Macrocentrus watanabei van Achterberg, 1993^{c g}
- Macrocentrus xingshanensis He, 1997^{c g}
- Macrocentrus yuanjiangensis He & Chen, 2000^{c g}
- Macrocentrus zhangi He & Chen, 2000^{c g}
- Macrocentrus zhejiangensis He & Chen, 2000^{c g}

Data sources: i = ITIS, c = Catalogue of Life, g = GBIF, b = Bugguide.net
