= Apozyx =

Scientific classification
- Kingdom: Animalia
- Phylum: Arthropoda
- Class: Insecta
- Order: Hymenoptera
- Family: Braconidae
- Subfamily: Apozyginae
- Genus: Apozyx; Mason, 1978
- Species: A. penyai

Binomial name
- Apozyx penyai Mason, 1978

Genus of wasps

Apozyx is a genus of braconid parasitic wasps with only one species, Apozyx penyai. It is the only genus in the subfamily Apozyginae. This subfamily was originally proposed as a separate family by Mason in 1978.

== Description and distribution ==
The genus Apozyx, and hence the subfamily Apozyginae, are the only braconids to possess the 2m-cu cross-vein of the forewing, the presence of which otherwise serves to distinguish ichneumonids from braconids. Apozygines have a cyclostome oral cavity.

The genus has only been found in Chile.

== Biology ==
It is suspected that Apozyx penyai has host use patterns similar to doryctines but there have been no direct observations.
