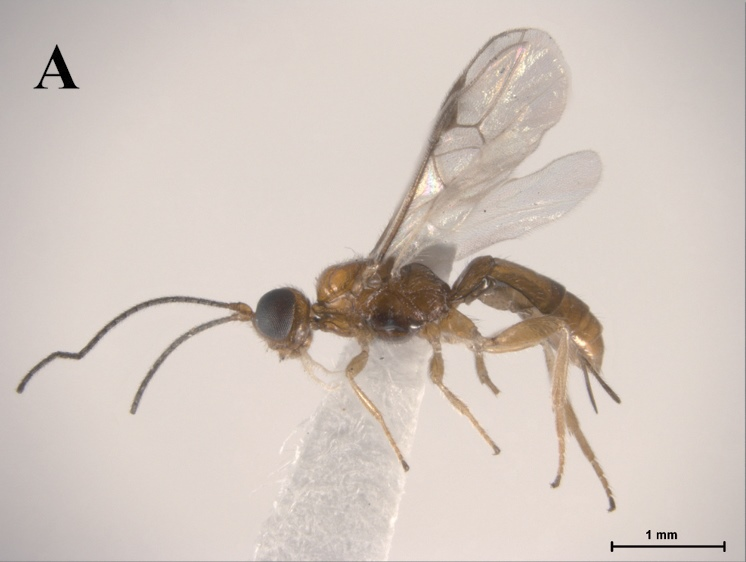
- Lissopsius pacificus

Scientific classification
- Kingdom: Animalia
- Phylum: Arthropoda
- Class: Insecta
- Order: Hymenoptera
- Family: Braconidae
- Subfamily: Doryctinae
- Genus: Lissopsius; Marsh, 2002

= Lissopsius =

Genus of wasps

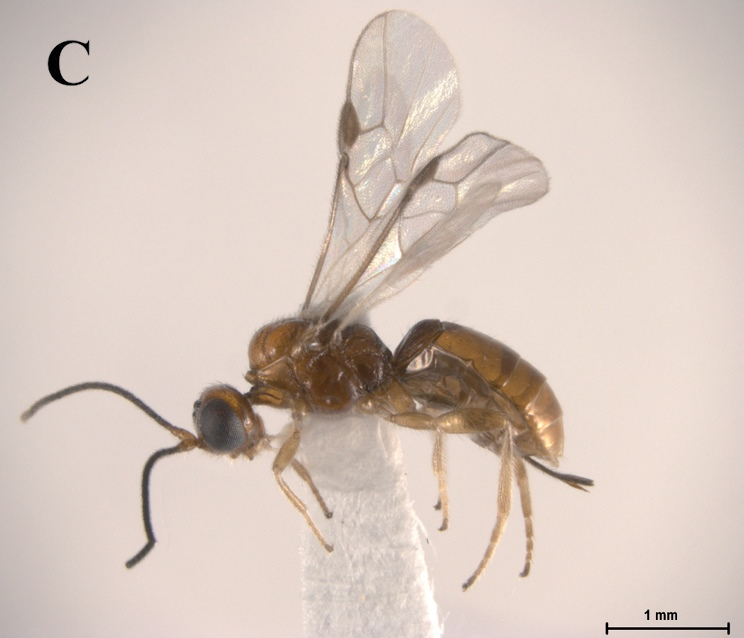
Lissopsius flavus

Lissopsius is a genus of wasp in the family Braconidae. There are at least three described species in Lissopsius, found in Mexico and Central America. They are generalist parasitoids of caterpillars.

== Species ==
These three species belong to the genus Lissopsius:

- Lissopsius flavus Marsh, 2002
- Lissopsius jaliscoensis Zaldívar-Riverón, Martinez, Ceccarelli & Shaw, 2012
- Lissopsius pacificus Zaldívar-Riverón, Martinez, Ceccarelli & Shaw, 2012
