= Diachasma alloeum =

Scientific classification
- Kingdom: Animalia
- Phylum: Arthropoda
- Class: Insecta
- Order: Hymenoptera
- Family: Braconidae
- Genus: Diachasma
- Species: D. alloeum

Binomial name
- Diachasma alloeum (Muesebeck, 1956)

Species of wasp

Diachasma alloeum is a small wasp in the family Braconidae. It is a parasitoid of Rhagoletis pomonella, the apple maggot. The wasp lays its eggs into third-instar larvae of the fly, which then develop after the larvae have pupated. The immature wasps then eat the fly larvae and overwinter inside the fly puparia.

D. alloeum wasps attacking R. pomonella in apples appear to be undergoing a speciation event in concert with their hosts. This is an example of sequential sympatric speciation.
