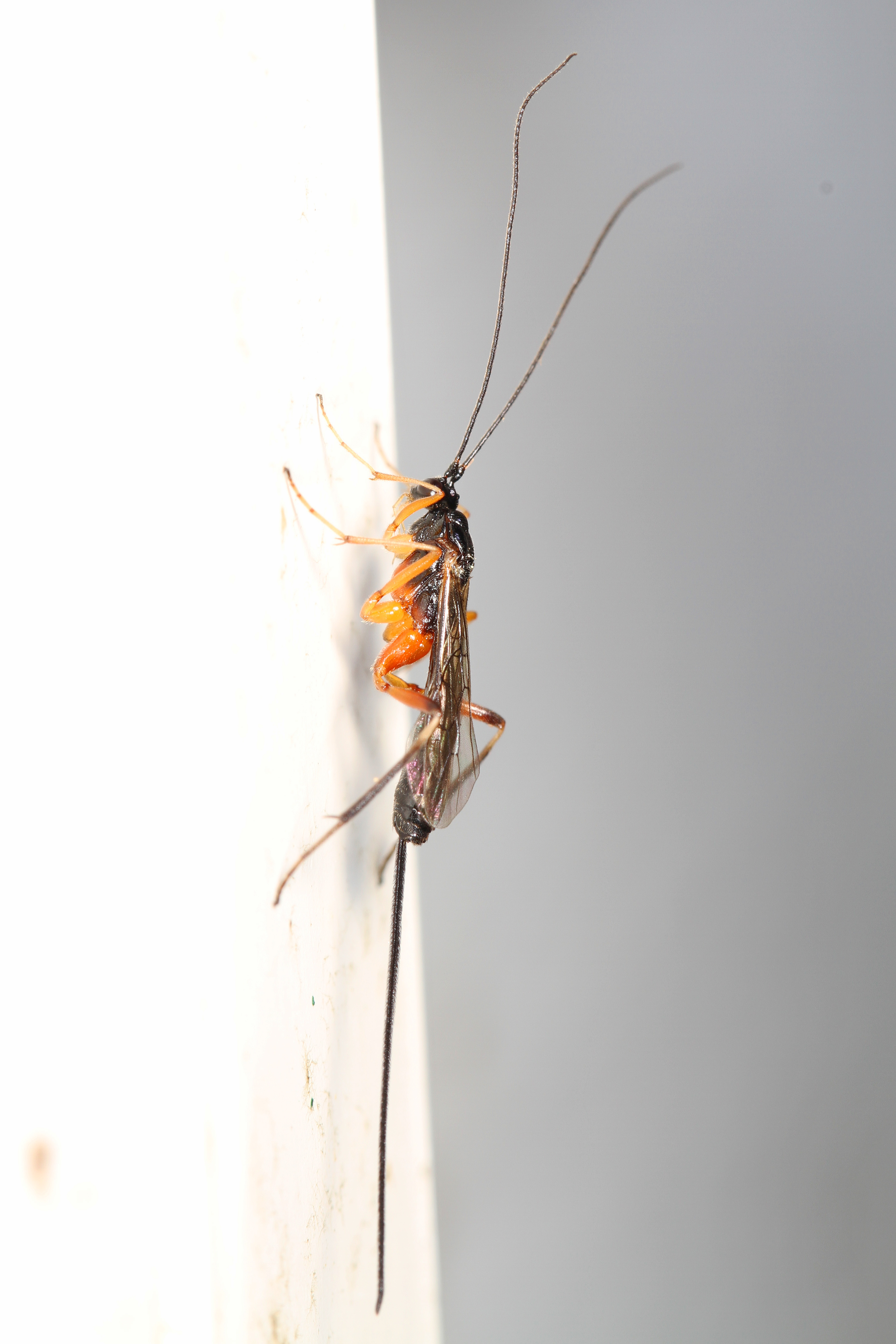

Scientific classification
- Kingdom: Animalia
- Phylum: Arthropoda
- Class: Insecta
- Order: Hymenoptera
- Family: Braconidae
- Subfamily: Macrocentrinae
- Genus: Macrocentrus; Curtis, 1833

= Macrocentrus =

Genus of wasps

Macrocentrus is a genus of wasp in the family Braconidae, with at least 180 described species in Macrocentrus.

== See also ==
- List of Macrocentrus species
