= Ivondrovia =

Scientific classification
- Kingdom: Animalia
- Phylum: Arthropoda
- Clade: Pancrustacea
- Class: Insecta
- Order: Hymenoptera
- Family: Braconidae
- Subfamily: Doryctinae
- Genus: Ivondrovia; Shenefelt & Marsh, 1976

Type species
- Lophogaster seyrigi Granger, 1949

Diversity
- 2 species

Synonyms
- Lophogaster Granger, 1949

Genus of wasps

Ivondrovia is a genus of parasitoid wasps belonging to the subfamily Doryctinae of the family Braconidae. This genus contains two species. It is found in the Afrotropical region.

== Description ==
Head high and transverse. Ocelli arranged in slightly obtuse triangle. Frons (forehead) slightly concave. Eyes glabrous. Clypeus slightly convex. No malar suture Antennae weakly setiform. Mesosoma not depressed. Pterostigma of fore wing rather narrow. Fore femur thick and short. Claws are simple, large, short and strongly curved.

== Species ==
- Ivondrovia grangeri Belokobylskij, Sergey, Zaldivar-Riveron, Alejandro & Castaneda-Osorio, Ruben, 2018 - Kenya
- Ivondrovia seyrigi (Granger, 1949) - Madagascar
