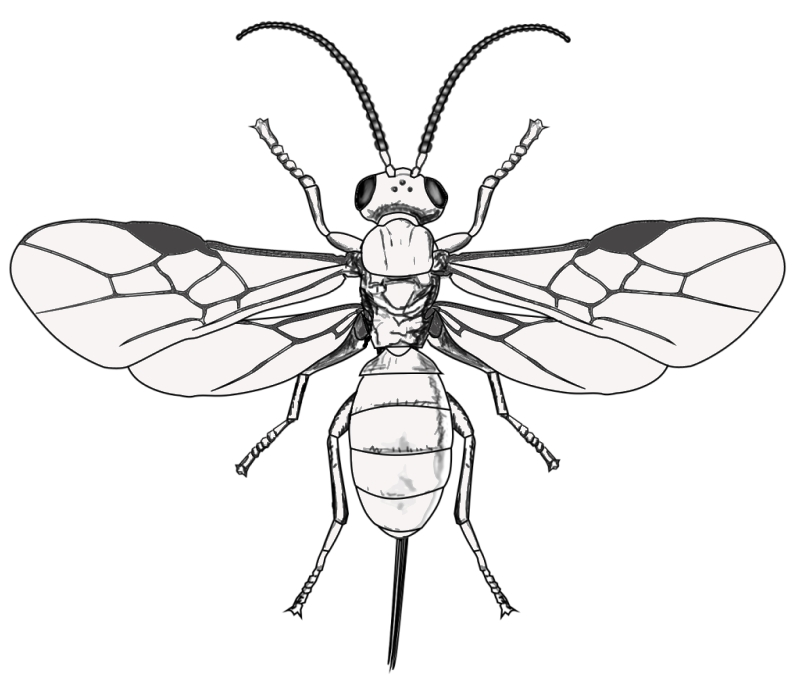
- Opius concolor

Scientific classification
- Kingdom: Animalia
- Phylum: Arthropoda
- Class: Insecta
- Order: Hymenoptera
- Family: Braconidae
- Subfamily: Opiinae
- Genus: Opius; Wesmael, 1835

Species
- See text

Synonyms
- Opiostomus Fischer, 1972

= Opius =

Genus of wasps

Opius is a genus of wasps in the family Braconidae. This genus has a wide geographic range and contains the majority of species in the subfamily Opiinae.

== Species ==
- Opius abbyae
- Opius abditiformis
- Opius abditus
- Opius aberrans
- Opius aberranticeps
- Opius aberrantipennis
- Opius acarinatus
- Opius acharaviensis
- Opius acuminatus
- Opius acuticlypealis
- Opius acuticrenis
- Opius adanacola
- Opius adductus
- Opius adentatus
- Opius adversus
- Opius aethiops
- Opius affinis
- Opius africanus
- Opius agromyzicola
- Opius ajax
- Opius alachuanus
- Opius albericus
- Opius albiapex
- Opius aldrichi
- Opius alekhinoensis
- Opius almatus
- Opius alsenus
- Opius altaiensis
- Opius alteratus
- Opius alticlypeatus
- Opius altritemporalis
- Opius alutaceator
- Opius alutacipectus
- Opius alvarengai
- Opius amaichaensis
- Opius amarellae
- Opius ambiguus
- Opius ambirius
- Opius ambitus
- Opius americanus
- Opius amplus
- Opius amurensis
- Opius anastrephae
- Opius andigeni
- Opius anduzei
- Opius angelus
- Opius angustatus
- Opius angusticellularis
- Opius angustistriatus
- Opius angustisulcus
- Opius ankaratrensis
- Opius annellaticornis
- Opius antefurcalis
- Opius antennatus
- Opius anthriscoidis
- Opius antrimensis
- Opius apfelbeckianus
- Opius apicalis
- Opius araucoensis
- Opius areatus
- Opius arenaceus
- Opius areolatus
- Opius argillaceus
- Opius aridis
- Opius arundinis
- Opius ascazubianus
- Opius atatanaensis
- Opius atricornis
- Opius atrocoxalis
- Opius attila
- Opius attributus
- Opius aureliae
- Opius austriacus
- Opius avispasensis
- Opius baguioensis
- Opius bajariae
- Opius bakonyensis
- Opius baldufi
- Opius ballade
- Opius balthasarius
- Opius bananipes
- Opius barraudi
- Opius barrioni
- Opius barrosensis
- Opius basalis
- Opius basicastaneus
- Opius basiniger
- Opius basirufulus
- Opius basisimplex
- Opius beieri
- Opius bellus
- Opius betae
- Opius bicarinifer
- Opius bicoloriformis
- Opius bidentis
- Opius bifossatus
- Opius blancasi
- Opius blantoni
- Opius boharti
- Opius bonatus
- Opius borneanus
- Opius bouceki
- Opius brachythorax
- Opius brasiliensis
- Opius brevicaudatus
- Opius brevicaudis
- Opius bromensis
- Opius brooki
- Opius brownsvillensis
- Opius bruneipes
- Opius brunescens
- Opius brunipennis
- Opius brunneitarsis
- Opius brunneiventris
- Opius brunnicoxis
- Opius bucki
- Opius buenaventurae
- Opius bulgaricus
- Opius bullatianus
- Opius bururianus
- Opius busuensis
- Opius caboverdensis
- Opius caesus
- Opius calatheae
- Opius callaensis
- Opius camerunensis
- Opius campinaensis
- Opius candixtus
- Opius canimensis
- Opius canlaonicus
- Opius cannonbeachensis
- Opius capeki
- Opius caprifolii
- Opius caprilesi
- Opius caracasensis
- Opius cardini
- Opius carensis
- Opius caricivorae
- Opius carinifacialis
- Opius carinifer
- Opius carinus
- Opius casparianus
- Opius castaneigaster
- Opius castor
- Opius caucasi
- Opius caudatus
- Opius caudisignatus
- Opius cehalovicki
- Opius celsiformis
- Opius celsus
- Opius chapini
- Opius chapmani
- Opius chewaucanus
- Opius chilensis
- Opius chillcotti
- Opius chimus
- Opius choristigma
- Opius chromaticus
- Opius chromatomyiae
- Opius chrysostigmus
- Opius ciceris
- Opius ciliatus
- Opius cinctus
- Opius cinerariae
- Opius cingulaticornis
- Opius cingulatigaster
- Opius cingulatoides
- Opius cingulatus
- Opius cingutolicus
- Opius cinnameus
- Opius circinus
- Opius circulator
- Opius circumscriptus
- Opius cisopertus
- Opius citlus
- Opius citripes
- Opius citronipus
- Opius clausus
- Opius clellanvillensis
- Opius clevelandensis
- Opius clidogastrae
- Opius cocafluvianus
- Opius cochisensis
- Opius coleogaster
- Opius colombina
- Opius coloradensis
- Opius coloraticeps
- Opius columbiacus
- Opius columbicus
- Opius commodus
- Opius compar
- Opius comparativus
- Opius conasis
- Opius concepcionensis
- Opius confundens
- Opius confusus
- Opius congoensis
- Opius connivens
- Opius contabundus
- Opius contractor
- Opius contrahens
- Opius contrasticeps
- Opius contrasticus
- Opius contrax
- Opius contrut
- Opius convergitalis
- Opius copaxis
- Opius cordobensis
- Opius corfuensis
- Opius coriaceus
- Opius coriaciceps
- Opius cortesanus
- Opius cosa
- Opius costaeburneae
- Opius costaricensis
- Opius crandalli
- Opius crassiceps
- Opius crassicrus
- Opius crassipes
- Opius crenulaticeps
- Opius crenulatus
- Opius crenuturis
- Opius crescentensis
- Opius cuencaensis
- Opius culatus
- Opius cumbaratzaensis
- Opius curiosicornis
- Opius curritibensis
- Opius curtiarticulatus
- Opius curticaudatus
- Opius curticornis
- Opius curticubitalis
- Opius curtisignum
- Opius curtisternaulis
- Opius curtitarsus
- Opius curvatus
- Opius cuzcoensis
- Opius cynipsidum
- Opius cyphus
- Opius cyrilli
- Opius daghestanicus
- Opius daghoides
- Opius dakarensis
- Opius damnosus
- Opius danicus
- Opius danielssoni
- Opius dariae
- Opius dataensis
- Opius deiphobe
- Opius delhianus
- Opius deliciosus
- Opius delipunctis
- Opius delvillei
- Opius demosthenis
- Opius derus
- Opius dewulfi
- Opius diana
- Opius diastatae
- Opius dicolatus
- Opius differentiarius
- Opius difficillimus
- Opius dilucidus
- Opius dimensus
- Opius dimidiatus
- Opius discordiosus
- Opius discreparius
- Opius disparens
- Opius dissitus
- Opius distincticornis
- Opius distortus
- Opius diurnus
- Opius divergens
- Opius divergifacialis
- Opius diversicurrens
- Opius dividus
- Opius dizygomyzae
- Opius docilis
- Opius dolichurus
- Opius dominicanus
- Opius douglasanus
- Opius downesi
- Opius dreisbachi
- Opius dryade
- Opius dschangensis
- Opius dubitarius
- Opius duplocarinatus
- Opius dureseaui
- Opius durigaster
- Opius eastridgeanus
- Opius echingolensis
- Opius echo
- Opius efoveolatus
- Opius egenus
- Opius ehrhorni
- Opius elguetai
- Opius elisabethvillensis
- Opius elsalvadorensis
- Opius eltablonensis
- Opius emarginatus
- Opius empedoklis
- Opius entzi
- Opius epimeralis
- Opius epulatiformis
- Opius epulatus
- Opius eros
- Opius erythroicus
- Opius erythrosoma
- Opius erzurumensis
- Opius esquinasensis
- Opius estoniacola
- Opius euaffinis
- Opius eupatorii
- Opius euphemia
- Opius euplasticus
- Opius euryanthe
- Opius euryteniformis
- Opius eurytenoides
- Opius euterpe
- Opius eutownesi
- Opius euwattacooanus
- Opius exiloides
- Opius eximius
- Opius extendicella
- Opius extensus
- Opius extrafactus
- Opius extremorientis
- Opius faber
- Opius facialis
- Opius farmingdalicus
- Opius femoralis
- Opius fennahi
- Opius fercolor
- Opius ferentarius
- Opius ferrugator
- Opius ficedus
- Opius fiebrigi
- Opius filicornis
- Opius filiflagellatus
- Opius finalis
- Opius fischeri
- Opius flammeus
- Opius flavens
- Opius flaveolaris
- Opius flaviceps
- Opius flavigaster
- Opius flavipartibus
- Opius flavipes
- Opius flavitestaceus
- Opius flavobasis
- Opius flosshilda
- Opius formosanus
- Opius formosigaster
- Opius forticornis
- Opius fossulatus
- Opius foutsi
- Opius fraudatus
- Opius fraudulentus
- Opius fulgoricolor
- Opius fumatipennis
- Opius furiosus
- Opius fuscicarpus
- Opius fuscipennis
- Opius gabrieli
- Opius gainesvillensis
- Opius galomirus
- Opius geniculatus
- Opius gerdi
- Opius giganticornis
- Opius gigapiceus
- Opius giluweensis
- Opius glabriceps
- Opius glabrifossa
- Opius glabripleurum
- Opius gliricidiae
- Opius globiformis
- Opius globigaster
- Opius gracielae
- Opius gracilior
- Opius gracilis
- Opius graecus
- Opius granipleuris
- Opius granulatigaster
- Opius graviceps
- Opius grenadensis
- Opius gribodoi
- Opius griffithsi
- Opius griseinotum
- Opius griseiscutum
- Opius guanabarensis
- Opius guatemalensis
- Opius gyges
- Opius gyoerfii
- Opius haereticus
- Opius haeselbarthi
- Opius halconicus
- Opius hancockanus
- Opius hardmanni
- Opius harlequin
- Opius harmonicus
- Opius harteni
- Opius hartleyi
- Opius hauca
- Opius hector
- Opius hedqvisti
- Opius heinrichi
- Opius helavai
- Opius helios
- Opius hellasensis
- Opius helluatus
- Opius hemifuscus
- Opius herbigradus
- Opius heringi
- Opius hermosanus
- Opius heroicus
- Opius heterocephalus
- Opius heterochromus
- Opius heterogaster
- Opius heteropterus
- Opius hirsutus
- Opius hirtus
- Opius hluluhwegamenicus
- Opius hoffmanni
- Opius hollisterensis
- Opius horwathi
- Opius hospes
- Opius hospitus
- Opius hubbelli
- Opius humilifactus
- Opius hydrellivorus
- Opius idealis
- Opius ignatii
- Opius igneus
- Opius iguacuensis
- Opius ileifensis
- Opius imperator
- Opius importatus
- Opius importunus
- Opius impressiformis
- Opius inancae
- Opius inca
- Opius incisulus
- Opius incoligma
- Opius indentatus
- Opius indistinctus
- Opius inflammatus
- Opius inflatipectus
- Opius infumatus
- Opius infuscatipennis
- Opius ingenticornis
- Opius inopinatus
- Opius inquirendus
- Opius instabilis
- Opius instabiloides
- Opius instaurativus
- Opius insulicola
- Opius integer
- Opius interjectus
- Opius intermissus
- Opius interpunctatus
- Opius interstitialis
- Opius iphigenia
- Opius iridipennis
- Opius irregularipes
- Opius irregularis
- Opius isolatae
- Opius ispartaensis
- Opius ithacensis
- Opius iuxtahaucaum
- Opius iuxtangelum
- Opius ivlievi
- Opius ivondroensis
- Opius izmirensis
- Opius jacansis
- Opius jacobi
- Opius jamaicensis
- Opius jenuffa
- Opius jipanus
- Opius johannis
- Opius josefi
- Opius jujuyensis
- Opius kaindeanus
- Opius kallibasis
- Opius kalligaster
- Opius karesuandensis
- Opius katonensis
- Opius katonicus
- Opius keralaicus
- Opius kibunguensis
- Opius kilisanus
- Opius kinleyensis
- Opius kirklareliensis
- Opius kisanganiensis
- Opius kostolnaensis
- Opius kovacsi
- Opius krishnagarensis
- Opius krombeini
- Opius kubani
- Opius kurilensis
- Opius kuruandensis
- Opius kuscheli
- Opius kyotoensis
- Opius labradorensis
- Opius lacajensis
- Opius lacarensis
- Opius lacopitaensis
- Opius laetatorius
- Opius laevicollis
- Opius laevigatus
- Opius lagomeraensis
- Opius languidus
- Opius lansingensis
- Opius lantanae
- Opius lara
- Opius larissa
- Opius lataganus
- Opius lateroareatus
- Opius latidens
- Opius latifacialis
- Opius latipediformis
- Opius latistigma
- Opius latitemporalis
- Opius leevingensis
- Opius leleji
- Opius lemonensis
- Opius leptoclypeus
- Opius leptosoma
- Opius leroyi
- Opius leucofasciatus
- Opius leucosema
- Opius leucoventris
- Opius levis
- Opius liogaster
- Opius lippensi
- Opius lippensimilis
- Opius liriomyzae
- Opius lissopleurum
- Opius lojaensis
- Opius longicornis
- Opius longicubitalis
- Opius longifoveatus
- Opius longiradis
- Opius longisignum
- Opius longissimicauda
- Opius longistigmus
- Opius lonicerae
- Opius loricatus
- Opius lucidoides
- Opius lucidus
- Opius lugens
- Opius lukasi
- Opius luniclypeus
- Opius lusorius
- Opius luteiceps
- Opius luteipes
- Opius luteus
- Opius macedonicus
- Opius machupicchuanus
- Opius macrocornis
- Opius maculimembris
- Opius maculipennis
- Opius maculipes
- Opius madatus
- Opius magallanensis
- Opius magicorum
- Opius magnicauda
- Opius magnicaudatus
- Opius major
- Opius mallecoensis
- Opius mandibularis
- Opius manifestarius
- Opius maraquoanus
- Opius marcapatanus
- Opius marci
- Opius margaensis
- Opius margateensis
- Opius mariae
- Opius marjorieae
- Opius martiarushensis
- Opius martini
- Opius matheranus
- Opius matthaei
- Opius mediopectus
- Opius mediosignum
- Opius medioterebratus
- Opius megafossa
- Opius meladermatus
- Opius melanagromyzae
- Opius melanarius
- Opius melanocephalus
- Opius melchioricus
- Opius mendus
- Opius metanivens
- Opius metanotalis
- Opius metatensis
- Opius metatus
- Opius methodii
- Opius michaeli
- Opius michelbacheri
- Opius microscopicus
- Opius microsomaticus
- Opius middlekauffi
- Opius miniaceus
- Opius minicornis
- Opius minorecella
- Opius minusculae
- Opius minusculus
- Opius minutus
- Opius mirabilis
- Opius mischa
- Opius mischiformis
- Opius mitiformis
- Opius mitis
- Opius mocsaryi
- Opius moczari
- Opius moderatus
- Opius mokotoensis
- Opius mongaguanus
- Opius mongolaltaiensis
- Opius monilicornis
- Opius monsonicus
- Opius montanus
- Opius montevidanus
- Opius monticola
- Opius moravicus
- Opius mujenjensis
- Opius mundus
- Opius myakkensis
- Opius nadezhdae
- Opius nadus
- Opius najade
- Opius nanocorpus
- Opius nanosoma
- Opius nanulus
- Opius nanus
- Opius negrosanus
- Opius neopendulus
- Opius neopygmaeus
- Opius nigeriensis
- Opius nigricolor
- Opius nigricoloratus
- Opius nigriocciput
- Opius nigritellae
- Opius nigritibia
- Opius nigrobrunneus
- Opius nigrocastaneus
- Opius nigromaculatus
- Opius nigrusus
- Opius nimifactus
- Opius niobe
- Opius nitidulator
- Opius nitidus
- Opius nivitibialis
- Opius nkuliensis
- Opius nobilis
- Opius nodifer
- Opius nomininguensis
- Opius nondilatatus
- Opius noonadanus
- Opius nories
- Opius northcarolinensis
- Opius nosamaensis
- Opius nowakowskii
- Opius novojariae
- Opius novosimilis
- Opius nympha
- Opius obesus
- Opius obscurator
- Opius obscurifactus
- Opius obscurifemur
- Opius obscuripennis
- Opius obscuripes
- Opius obscuroma
- Opius obuduensis
- Opius obustus
- Opius obversus
- Opius occidentalis
- Opius occulisus
- Opius ocellatus
- Opius ochrogaster
- Opius ocreatus
- Opius olmosensis
- Opius onzi
- Opius opacus
- Opius opertaneus
- Opius opertus
- Opius opportunus
- Opius oralis
- Opius orbiculator
- Opius ordinarius
- Opius orestes
- Opius orizabensis
- Opius ornatigaster
- Opius oscinidis
- Opius osogovoensis
- Opius osoguineus
- Opius ostentaneus
- Opius ostentatus
- Opius otiosus
- Opius ovaliscapus
- Opius ovator
- Opius ovistigma
- Opius oxatus
- Opius pachypus
- Opius pactus
- Opius padidalis
- Opius pallas
- Opius pallicoxis
- Opius pallidipalpalis
- Opius palligaster
- Opius pallipes
- Opius palpalis
- Opius panamanus
- Opius pandora
- Opius papagena
- Opius paradisiacus
- Opius paraensis
- Opius paraitepuyensis
- Opius paralleliformis
- Opius parallelipetiolatus
- Opius paranivens
- Opius paraphytomyzae
- Opius paraplasticus
- Opius paraqvisti
- Opius parawattacooanus
- Opius paris
- Opius parkeranus
- Opius parkercreekensis
- Opius partisanskiensis
- Opius parvicrenis
- Opius parvungula
- Opius paulior
- Opius paulus
- Opius pauper
- Opius pechlaneri
- Opius pechumani
- Opius peckorum
- Opius pedestris
- Opius peleus
- Opius penai
- Opius pendulus
- Opius penetrator
- Opius pequodorum
- Opius perminutus
- Opius perpygmaeus
- Opius persimilis
- Opius perterrens
- Opius peruensis
- Opius pestarus
- Opius peterseni
- Opius petiolaris
- Opius petiolatus
- Opius petri
- Opius phantasticus
- Opius phytobiae
- Opius pickensanus
- Opius pilgrimorum
- Opius pilifer
- Opius piloralis
- Opius pilosicornis
- Opius pilosinotum
- Opius pilosus
- Opius pimoensis
- Opius pirchitticola
- Opius pisgahensis
- Opius plaumanni
- Opius podomelas
- Opius pollux
- Opius polyzonius
- Opius ponticus
- Opius porrectus
- Opius porteri
- Opius posadai
- Opius posjeticus
- Opius praesentarius
- Opius prignum
- Opius primus
- Opius prolongatus
- Opius propeattilam
- Opius propectoralis
- Opius propecubitalis
- Opius propepactum
- Opius propodealis
- Opius propofoveatus
- Opius propriorufus
- Opius protractiterebra
- Opius pseudarenaceus
- Opius pseudocolumbiacus
- Opius pseudonapomyzae
- Opius pseudoromensis
- Opius pterostigmalis
- Opius pterostigmatus
- Opius pterus
- Opius puertoplatanus
- Opius pulchriceps
- Opius pulex
- Opius pulicariae
- Opius pumilio
- Opius punanus
- Opius punctaticlypeus
- Opius puncticeps
- Opius punctipes
- Opius punctularius
- Opius punctulatoides
- Opius punctulatus
- Opius pusillator
- Opius pusillus
- Opius putomayoanus
- Opius pygmaeator
- Opius pygmaeus
- Opius pyrogaster
- Opius quadricolor
- Opius quasilatipes
- Opius quasipulvis
- Opius quasiqvisti
- Opius quercicola
- Opius radialis
- Opius rainierensis
- Opius ranunculicola
- Opius raoi
- Opius rarus
- Opius reconditor
- Opius rectinervatus
- Opius regularipes
- Opius regulorum
- Opius relativus
- Opius remissus
- Opius remotus
- Opius repentinus
- Opius resinae
- Opius restrictus
- Opius resupinus
- Opius retracticauda
- Opius rex
- Opius rheasilviae
- Opius rhodopicola
- Opius rhodosoma
- Opius richardsi
- Opius riopastazanus
- Opius riphaeus
- Opius robustus
- Opius romensis
- Opius romensoides
- Opius rossi
- Opius rotundiusculus
- Opius roveretoi
- Opius rovinator
- Opius rudiformis
- Opius rufescens
- Opius ruficolor
- Opius rufimixtus
- Opius rufipes
- Opius rufipleurum
- Opius rufisignum
- Opius rufocinctus
- Opius rufomaculatus
- Opius rufopleuris
- Opius rufus
- Opius rugatus
- Opius rugicoxis
- Opius rugipropodealis
- Opius rugisternum
- Opius rugosiusculus
- Opius rugosulus
- Opius rumecatus
- Opius russalka
- Opius sabhayanus
- Opius sabroskyi
- Opius saevulus
- Opius saevus
- Opius salmonensis
- Opius salmossi
- Opius saltator
- Opius salvini
- Opius sanctannae
- Opius sanctus
- Opius sanestabanensis
- Opius sanjoseensis
- Opius sanmiguelensis
- Opius santosanus
- Opius santuzzae
- Opius saovicentensis
- Opius sapamoroanus
- Opius sapporanus
- Opius scaevolae
- Opius schildi
- Opius schmidti
- Opius scleroticus
- Opius sculptigaster
- Opius sculptipleurum
- Opius sculptisaevus
- Opius scutellocarina
- Opius seductus
- Opius selimbassai
- Opius seminotaulicus
- Opius semitestaceus
- Opius servus
- Opius shabelliensis
- Opius sharynensis
- Opius shenefelti
- Opius shuleri
- Opius sierraanchaensis
- Opius sigmodus
- Opius signatitibia
- Opius signicella
- Opius signicoxa
- Opius signifemur
- Opius signipes
- Opius signisoma
- Opius silifkeensis
- Opius silvestris
- Opius similarius
- Opius similis
- Opius simillimus
- Opius similoides
- Opius simplex
- Opius simplificatus
- Opius sinareola
- Opius sinenotaulis
- Opius singularis
- Opius singulator
- Opius sinocis
- Opius smithi
- Opius snoflaki
- Opius soenderupianus
- Opius soledadensis
- Opius solus
- Opius solymosae
- Opius sonja
- Opius soror
- Opius southcarolinensis
- Opius speciosus
- Opius sperabilis
- Opius srilankensis
- Opius staryi
- Opius stenopectus
- Opius stieglmayri
- Opius striatitergum
- Opius striativentris
- Opius striatoides
- Opius striatulus
- Opius strombaceus
- Opius strouhali
- Opius subaffinis
- Opius subareatus
- Opius subcampanariae
- Opius subcirculator
- Opius subdividus
- Opius subdocilis
- Opius subhilaris
- Opius subpallipes
- Opius subpulicariae
- Opius subreconditor
- Opius subrotundatus
- Opius subsimilis
- Opius subversivus
- Opius subvisibilis
- Opius subvitellinus
- Opius succineus
- Opius sulcifer
- Opius superbus
- Opius superficiarius
- Opius suscitatus
- Opius suspiciosus
- Opius sybille
- Opius sycophanta
- Opius tabificus
- Opius tablerockensis
- Opius taddei
- Opius tadzhicus
- Opius tafivallensis
- Opius takomaanus
- Opius tamara
- Opius tametus
- Opius tamino
- Opius tangens
- Opius tantalus
- Opius tantilloides
- Opius tantillus
- Opius taplejungensis
- Opius teheranensis
- Opius tekirdagensis
- Opius telamonis
- Opius telramundi
- Opius tenellae
- Opius tenfanus
- Opius tenuipilosus
- Opius terebrator
- Opius terebratus
- Opius terebrifer
- Opius tergitalis
- Opius tersus
- Opius testaceipes
- Opius testaceiventris
- Opius testaceus
- Opius thaicorus
- Opius thalia
- Opius thalis
- Opius thaungi
- Opius thiemo
- Opius thoracicus
- Opius thoracoangulatus
- Opius tibialis
- Opius tingomarianus
- Opius tirolensis
- Opius tobiasi
- Opius tolucaensis
- Opius toromojaensis
- Opius tortus
- Opius torulatus
- Opius townesi
- Opius townsendi
- Opius trachyscutum
- Opius transatlanticus
- Opius transbaikalicus
- Opius transcaucasicus
- Opius transversoclypealis
- Opius trencensis
- Opius triplehorni
- Opius tristis
- Opius tropaeoli
- Opius troyensis
- Opius truncatulus
- Opius tscheki
- Opius tshitensis
- Opius tshutshurmuranicus
- Opius tuberculatus
- Opius tuberculifer
- Opius tubibasis
- Opius tucumanus
- Opius tulcanensis
- Opius tumus
- Opius tunensis
- Opius turcicus
- Opius turiddui
- Opius turrialbanus
- Opius uencensis
- Opius ugandensis
- Opius ulaanus
- Opius uligiloci
- Opius unicarinatus
- Opius unicatus
- Opius unifactus
- Opius unifasciatus
- Opius unificatus
- Opius uniformis
- Opius unitus
- Opius urundanus
- Opius utahensis
- Opius utinanus
- Opius uttoi
- Opius uttoisimilis
- Opius uvarovi
- Opius wachsmanni
- Opius valdiviensis
- Opius valki
- Opius walleyi
- Opius waterloti
- Opius wattacooanus
- Opius weemsi
- Opius wellgunda
- Opius veratri
- Opius vernicosus
- Opius vianus
- Opius vicinigundae
- Opius victosimilis
- Opius viennensis
- Opius vierecki
- Opius wilhelmensis
- Opius villavicenciensis
- Opius vindex
- Opius vinoanus
- Opius violaceae
- Opius virentis
- Opius virtuosus
- Opius visibilis
- Opius vitellinus
- Opius vittatus
- Opius vocatus
- Opius woerziphagus
- Opius woglinda
- Opius volaticus
- Opius vulcanicus
- Opius wutaishanus
- Opius xerxes
- Opius yahuarmayoanus
- Opius yuracensis
- Opius zacapuensis
- Opius zamoraensis
