= Dirrhope =

Scientific classification
- Kingdom: Animalia
- Phylum: Arthropoda
- Class: Insecta
- Order: Hymenoptera
- Family: Braconidae
- Subfamily: Dirrhopinae van Achterberg, 1984
- Genus: Dirrhope; Förster, 1851

Genus of wasps

Dirrhope is the only extant genus in the subfamily Dirrhopinae of braconid parasitoid wasps. Dirrope was included in the Microgastrinae until 1984. Specimens of this genus have been found fossilized in amber dating from the Cretaceous period.

== Description and distribution ==
Dirrhope are rarely collected, very small wasps. They are similar to small microgastrines but the first metasomal segment is highly flattened with the spiracle on the median rather than lateral tergite.

This genus may have a cosmopolitan distribution, but has so far been found in the holarctic region, South-East Asia, South Africa, Australasia, and Central America.

== Biology ==
Little has been observed of the biology of Dirrhope but due to their close relationship with the Microgastrinae they are likely koinobiont endoparasitoids and may carry polydnaviruses. One species of Dirrhope has been reared from Ectoedemia phleophaga (Nepticulidae).
