= Trachypetinae =

Scientific classification
- Kingdom: Animalia
- Phylum: Arthropoda
- Clade: Pancrustacea
- Class: Insecta
- Order: Hymenoptera
- Family: Braconidae
- Subfamily: Trachypetinae; Schulz, 1911

Genera
- Cercobarcon Tobias, 1979; Megalohelcon Turner, 1918; Trachypetus Guérin-Méneville, 1830

Family of wasps

Trachypetinae is a subfamily of the wasp family Braconidae, comprising three rare Australian genera of large parasitoid wasps. The subfamily was raised to family rank as Trachypetidae in 2020, but was reduced back to a subfamily in 2022.
