= Dimeris =

Scientific classification
- Kingdom: Animalia
- Phylum: Arthropoda
- Class: Insecta
- Order: Hymenoptera
- Family: Braconidae
- Genus: Dimeris; Ruthe, 1854

Genus of insects

Dimeris is a genus of parasitoid wasps belonging to the family Braconidae.

The species of this genus are found in Northern Europe and North America.

Species:

- Dimeris mira Ruthe, 1854
