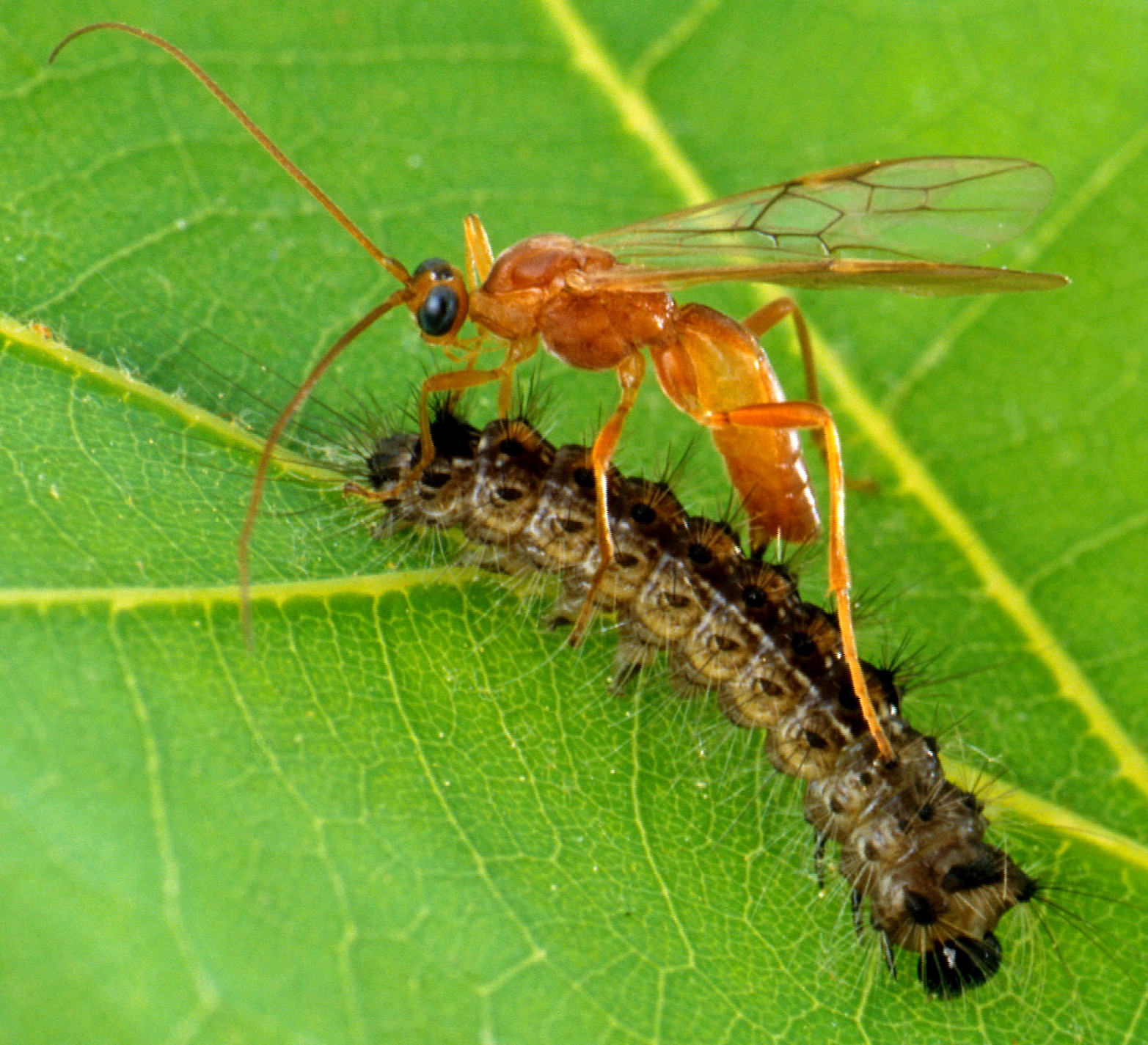
- Aleiodes indiscretus wasp parasitizing a gypsy moth caterpillar

Scientific classification
- Domain: Eukaryota
- Kingdom: Animalia
- Phylum: Arthropoda
- Class: Insecta
- Order: Hymenoptera
- Family: Braconidae
- Genus: Aleiodes
- Species: A. indiscretus

Binomial name
- Aleiodes indiscretus (Reardon, 1970)

= Aleiodes indiscretus =

Species of wasp

Aleiodes indiscretus is a species of parasitoid wasp.
