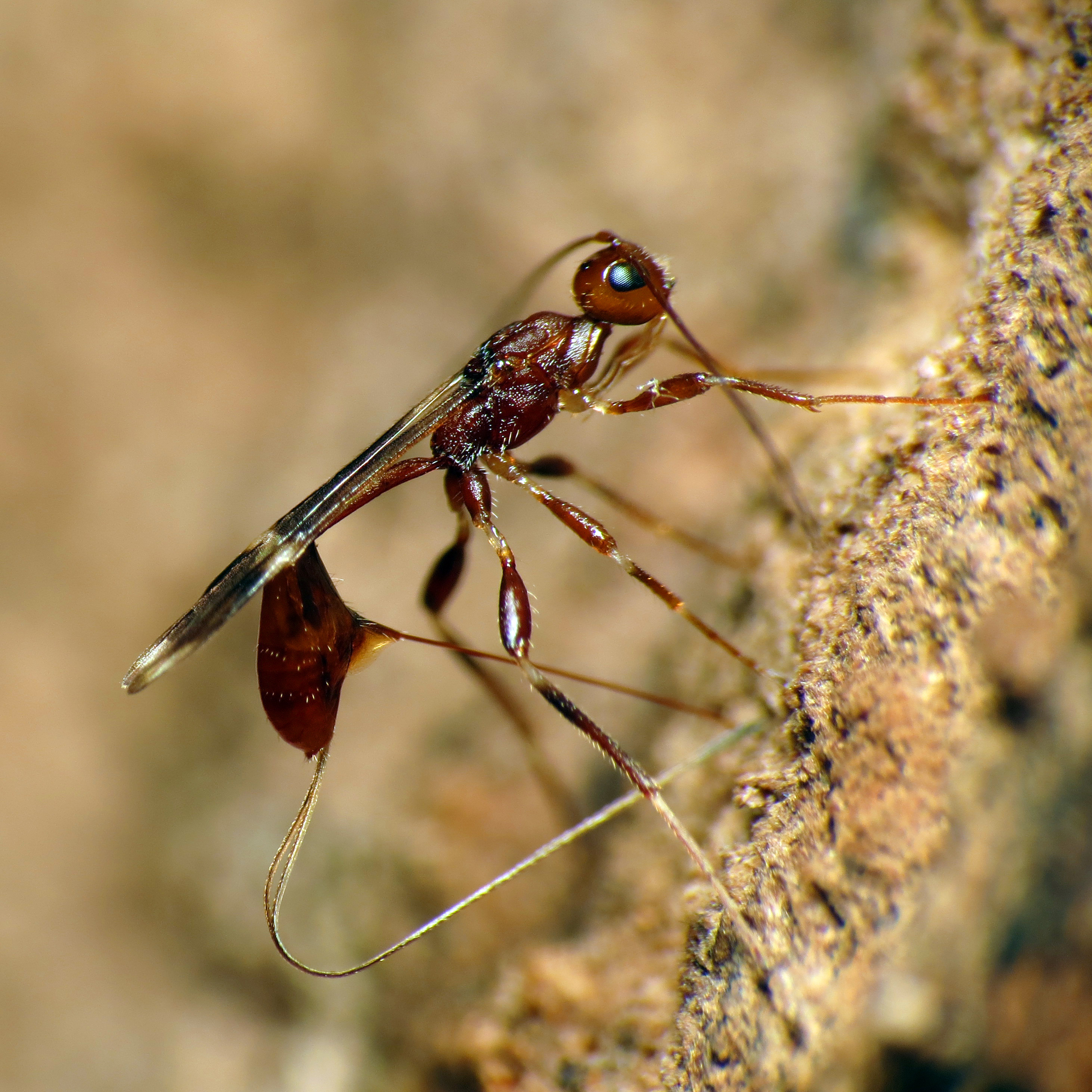
- Female doryctine ovipositing on beetle larvae inside wood

Scientific classification
- Kingdom: Animalia
- Phylum: Arthropoda
- Clade: Pancrustacea
- Class: Insecta
- Order: Hymenoptera
- Family: Braconidae
- Subfamily: Doryctinae; Foerster, 1863

Genera
- Numerous (almost 180), see text

= Doryctinae =

Subfamily of wasps

The Doryctinae or doryctine wasps are a large subfamily of parasitoid wasps within the family Braconidae.

== Description and identification ==
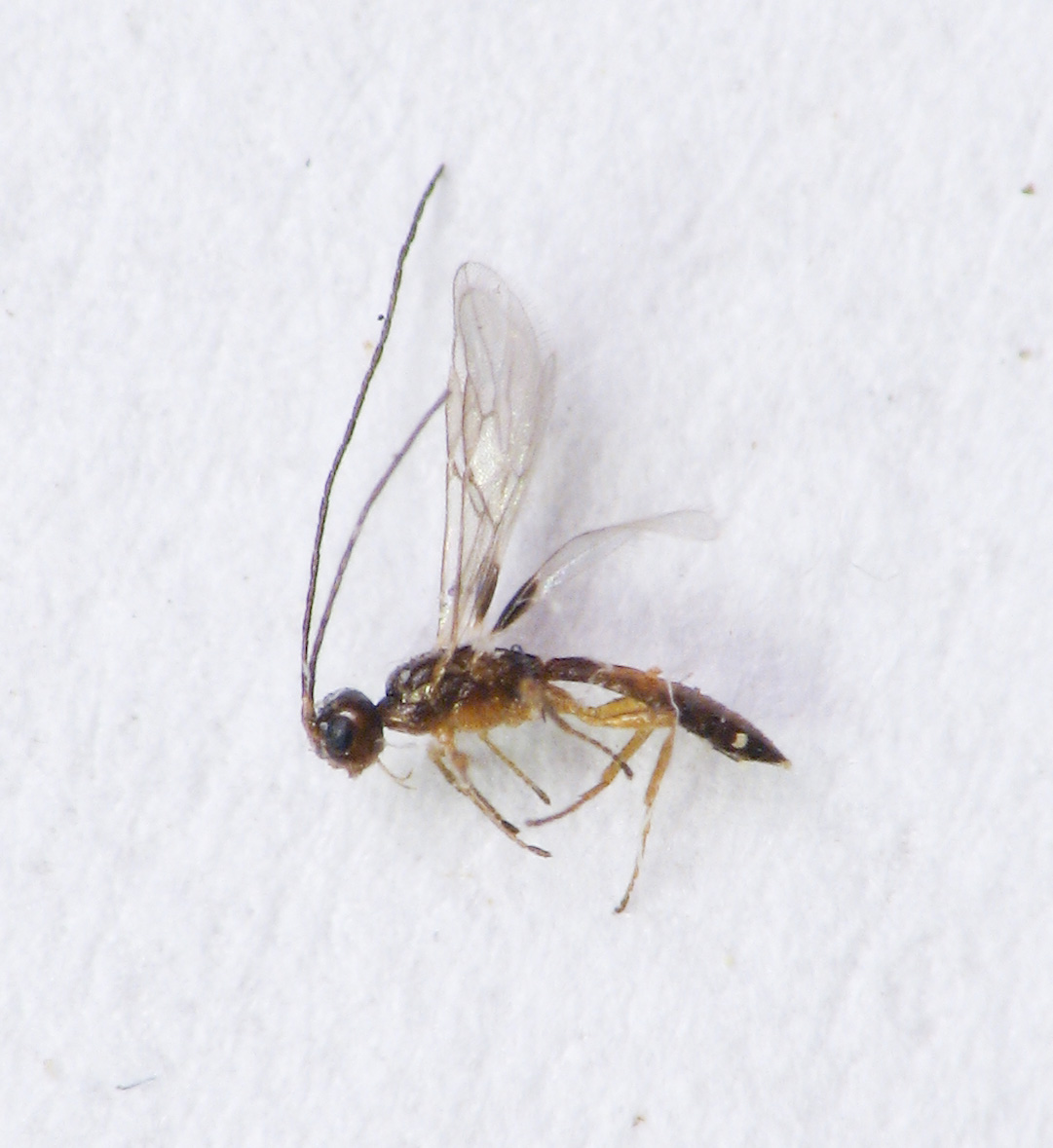
Heterospilus eurostae, male

Doryctine wasps are found across almost the entire size range of Braconidae, from 1 to 25 mm. In the small species the head tends to be relatively large and the body, while slender, remarkably elongated. Doryctines tend to be small-winged, with many having very much reduced wings. Numerous species in this family are unable to fly or even lack wings entirely. They have a characteristic row of stout spines running lengthwise along the foreleg tibia, and a cyclostome depression above the mandibles.

== Distribution ==
Doryctinae have a worldwide distribution except for the polar regions.

== Biology ==
Some Doryctinae are known to form galls on plants similar to the Mesostoinae (a small subfamily endemic to Australia). Some species in the genus Allorhogas feed on seeds. The large majority of doryctines are idiobiont ectoparasitoids of the larvae of wood-boring beetles – such as jewel beetles (Buprestidae). Some species parasitize lepidopteran or symphytan larvae. The host is paralyzed by venom injected through the female's ovipositor before an egg is laid. The spines present on the foreleg of the adult enable it to escape from the narrow wooden tunnels of the hosts.

== Biological control ==
Doryctines have been used to control pests in Europe, Australia, and North America. Several doryctine wasps are of economic importance as biocontrol agents in Australia against eucalyptus pests. The species Spathius agrili has been introduced to the United States from China in an effort to control the emerald ash borer.

== Taxonomy and phylogeny ==
Doryctinae is considered to be part of the cyclostome group, a clade of subfamilies including Alysiinae, Betylobraconinae, Braconinae, Gnamptodontinae, Exothecinae, Hormiinae, Lysiterminae, Opiinae, Pambolinae, Rogadinae, Rhysipolinae, and Rhyssalinae.

16 tribes of Doryctinae have been designated. The former subfamily Ypsistocerinae has been subsumed under Doryctinae as one of these tribes, Ypsistocerini.

Doryctinae comprises over 2000 species in 198 genera, with new taxa continuing to be described. 182 of the genera placed in the Doryctinae include:

=== Tribe Binareini ===
- Acanthodoryctes Turner, 1918
- Antidoryctes Belokobylskij & Quicke, 2000
- Binarea Brullé, 1846
- Dooliba Belokobylskij, Iqbal & Austin, 2004
- Liobracon Szépligeti, 1901

=== Tribe Doryctini ===
- Acanthorhogas Szepligeti, 1906
- †Anacanthobracon Brues, 1939
- Aphelopsia Marsh, 1993
- Asiaontsira Belokobylskij, Tang, & Chen, 2013
- Bracodoryctes Belokobylskij & Quicke, 2000
- Bracocesa Koçak & Kemal, 2008
- Bulbonervus Shenefelt, 1969
- Caenophanes Foerster, 1862
- Caingangia Marsh, 1993
- Cecidospathius Kieffer & Jörgensen, 1910
- Ceratodoryctes Belokobylskij, Iqbal & Austin, 2004
- Chelonodoryctes Belokobylskij & Quicke, 2000
- Coiba Marsh, 1993
- Cryptodoryctes Belokobylskij & Quicke, 2000
- Cryptontsira Belokobylskij, 2008
- Cyphodoryctes Marsh, 1993
- Dendrosoter Wesmael, 1838
- Dendrosotinus Telenga, 1941
- Dicarinoryctes Braet & van Achterberg, 2001
- Donquickeia Marsh, 1997
- Doryctes Haliday, 1836
- Doryctodes Hellén, 1927
- Doryctophasmus Enderlein, 1912
- Doryctopsis Belokobylskij, Iqbal & Austin, 2004
- Echinodoryctes Belokobylskij, Iqbal & Austin, 2004
- Eodendrus Belokobylskij, 2005
- Esterella Pagliano & Scaramozzino, 1990
- Euscelinus Westwood, 1882
- Guaygata Marsh, 1993
- Gymnobracon Szépligeti, 1902
- Halycaea Cameron, 1903
- Heerz Marsh, 1993
- Histeromeroides Marsh, 1993
- Hybodoryctes Szépligeti, 1906
- Hypodoryctes Kokujev, 1900
- Janzenia Marsh, 1993
- Johnsonius Marsh, 1993
- Kauriphanes Belokobylskij, Ceccarelli, Zaldívar-Riverón, 2012
- Lamquetia Braet, Barbalho & van Achterberg, 2003
- Latana Cameron, 1906
- Megaloproctus Schulz, 1906
- Neostaphius Braet, Barbalhoa & van Achterberg, 2003
- Neurocrassus Šnoflák, 1945
- Odontodoryctes Granger, 1949
- Ontsira Cameron, 1900
- Ontsirospathius Belokobylskij, Iqbal & Austin, 2004
- Osmophila Szépligeti, 1902
- †Palaeorhyssalus Brues, 1933
- Pedinotus Szépligeti, 1902
- Pirramurra Belokobylskij, Iqbal & Austin, 2004
- Priosphys Enderlein, 1920
- †Promonolexis Brues, 1933
- Pseudodoryctes Szépligeti, 1915</small
- Rhoptrocentrus Marshall, 1897
- Sharkeyella Marsh, 1993
- Shawius Marsh, 1993
- Sinaodoryctes Chen & Shi, 2004
- Sonanus Belokobylskij & Konishi, 2001
- Tarasco Marsh, 1993
- Verae Marsh, 1993
- Waitaca Marsh, 1993
- Whartonius Marsh, 1993
- Whitfieldiellus Marsh, 1997

=== Tribe Ecphylini ===
- Achterbergia Marsh, 1993
- Aivalykus Nixon, 1938
- Bohartiellus Marsh, 1983
- Ecphylus Foerster, 1862
- Sycosoter Picard & Lichtenstein, 1917

=== Tribe Evaniodini ===
- Evaniodes Szépligeti, 1901

=== Tribe Hecabolini ===
- Allorhogas Gahan, 1912
- Callihormius Ashmead, 1900
- Curtisella Spinola, 1851
- Doryctinus Roman, 1910 (= Acrophasmus)
- Glyptocolastes Ashmead, 1900
- Hecabolodes Wilkinson 1929
- Hecabolomorpha Belokobylskij & Chen, 2006
- Hecabolus Curtis, 1834
- Hemidoryctes Belokobylskij, 1993 (= Atopodoryctes)
- Leluthia Cameron, 1887
- Monolexis Foerster, 1862
- Pambolidea Ashmead, 1900
- Parallorhogas Marsh, 1993
- Pareucorystes Tobias, 1961
- Percnobraconoides Marsh, 1989
- Polystenus Foerster, 1862
- Semirhytus Szépligeti, 1902
- Spathiostenus Belokobylskij, 1993
- Stenocorse Marsh, 1968
- Terate Nixon, 1943
- Tripteria Enderlein, 1912

=== Tribe Heterospilini ===
- Asiaheterospilus Belokobylskij & Konishi, 2001
- Canchim Barbalho & Penteado-Dias, 1999
- Dapsilitas Braet, Barbalhoa & van Achterberg, 2003
- Ecphylopsis Ashmead, 1900
- Heterospilus Haliday, 1836
- Jataiella Barbalho & Penteado-Dias, 1999
- Neoheterospilus Belokobylskij, 2006
- Paraheterospilus Marsh, 2013
- Pioscelus Muesebeck & Walkley 1951
- Synspilus Belokobylskij & Quicke, 2000

=== Tribe Holcobraconini ===
- Holcobracon Cameron, 1905
- Ivondrovia Shenefelt & Marsh, 1976
- Liodoryctes Szépligeti, 1906
- Odontobracon Cameron, 1887
- Monarea Szépligeti, 1904
- Nervellius Roman, 1924
- Zombrus Marshall, 1897

=== Tribe Labaniini ===
- Labania Hedqvist, 1963

=== Tribe Leptospathiini ===
- Australospathius Belokobylskij, Iqbal & Austin, 2004
- Leptospathius Szépligeti, 1902
- Oroceguera Seltmann & Sharkey, 2007
- Schlettereriella Szépligeti, 1904
- Stephanospathius Belokobylskij, 1992

=== Tribe Mononeurini ===
- Leptodoryctes Barbalho & Penteado-Dias, 1999
- Mononeuron Fischer, 1981
- Nipponecphylus Belokobylskij, 2001

=== Tribe Percnobraconini ===
- Fijibracon Belokobylskij, 1995
- Fritziella Marsh, 1993
- Masonius Marsh, 1993
- Micrommatus Marsh, 1993
- Percnobracon Kieffer & Jörgensen, 1910

=== Tribe Rhaconotini ===
- Antespathius Belokobylskij, 1995
- Aptenobracon Marsh, 1965
- Arhaconotus Belokobylskij, 2001
- Bathycentor Saussure, 1892
- Grangerdoryctes Belokobylskij, 2004
- Ipodoryctes Granger, 1949
- Leptorhaconotus Granger, 1949
- Mimipodoryctes Belokobylskij, 2000
- Neorhaconotus Belokobylskij, Iqbal & Austin, 2004
- Platyspathius Viereck, 1911
- Pseudorhaconotus van Achterberg, 2009
- Rhaconotus Ruthe, 1854
- Rhacontsira Belokobylskij, 1998

=== Tribe Sericobraconini ===
- Sericobracon Shaw & Edgerly, 1985

=== Tribe Siragrini ===
- Arkoola Belokobylskij, Iqbal & Austin, 2004
- Gurburra Belokobylskij, Iqbal & Austin, 2004
- Jarra Marsh & Austin, 1994
- Pseudosyngaster Belokobylskij, Iqbal & Austin, 2004
- Siragra Cameron, 1907
- Syngaster Brullé, 1846

=== Tribe Spathiini ===
- Afrospathius Belokobylskij & Quicke, 2000
- Celereon Say, 1836
- Ceylonspathius Belokobylskij
- Concurtisella Roman, 1924
- Fijispathius Belokobylskij, Iqbal & Austin, 2004
- Hemispathius Belokobylskij & Quicke, 2000
- Notiospathius Matthews & Marsh
- Parana Nixon, 1943
- Paraspathius Viereck, 1911
- Psenobolus Reinhard, 1885
- Ptesimogaster Marsh
- Rhyukyuspathius Belokoblylskij, 2008
- Sisupala Nixon, 1943
- Spathiomorpha Tobias, 1976
- Spathioplites Fischer
- Spathius Nees, 1818
- Termitospathius Belokobylskij, 2002
- Toka Nixon, 1943
- Trigonophasmus Enderlein, 1912

=== Tribe Ypsistocerini ===
- Embobracon van Achterberg, 1995
- Preembobracon Quicke & Butcher, 2015
- Termitobracon Brues, 1923
- Ypsistocerus Cushman, 1923

=== Tribal placement unknown ===
- Barbalhoa Marsh, 2002
- Bolivar Zaldívar-Riverón & Rodríguez-Jiménez, 2013
- Doryctopambolus Nunes, et al., 2012
- Iare Barbalho & Penteado-Dias, 2000
- Lianus Gomes & Penteado-Dias, 2006
- Lissopsius Marsh, 2002
- Mexiare Belokobylskij, Samaca-Sáenz, & Zaldívar-Riverón, 2015
- Mimodoryctes Zaldívar-Riverón & Rodríguez-Jiménez, 2013
- Rasnitsynoryctes Belokobylskij, 2011
- Sergey Martinez, Lazaro, Pedraza-Lara, & Zaldivar-Riveron, 2016
- Tuberatra Gadelha, Nunes, & de Oliveira, 2016
- Venifurca Gadelha, Nunes, Zaldivar-Riveron, & de Oliveira, 2016
