= Cyclostome =

Cyclostome is a biological term (from the Greek for "round mouth") used in a few different senses:

- for the taxon Cyclostomi, which comprises the extant jawless fishes: the hagfish (Myxini) and the lampreys (Petromyzontidae). This was thought for a time to be a paraphyletic group and this usage of the term was deprecated by some. However, there is strong molecular evidence for cyclostome monophyly, and thus the term remains in use.
- for the Order Cyclostomatida of bryozoans, tiny animals that live in colonies and form large calcitic skeletons.
- for one of two subgroups of braconid wasps.
