= Mesostoinae =

Scientific classification
- Kingdom: Animalia
- Phylum: Arthropoda
- Class: Insecta
- Order: Hymenoptera
- Family: Braconidae
- Subfamily: Mesostoinae van Achterberg, 1975

Subfamily of wasps

The Mesostoinae is a subfamily of braconid wasps with a Gondwanan distribution. The members of this family display sexual dimorphism, males are brachypterous, which means that they have reduced, non-functional wings.

== Biology ==
The Mesostoini and Hydrangeocolini include primary gall formers on Banksia and parasites of the gall-forming Cecidomyiidae. The Avgini include parasitoids of leaf-mining and leaf-rolling Lepidoptera.

== Genera ==
This subfamily contains the following thirteen genera:

=== Avgini (Austrohormiini) ===
- Apoavga
- Austrohormius
- Canberria
- Doryctomorpha
- Hormiitis
- Neptihormius
- Proavga

=== Hydrangeocolini ===
- Aspilodemon
- Hydrangeocola

=== Mesostoini ===
- Andesipolis
- Opiopterus
- Mesostoa
- Praonopterus
