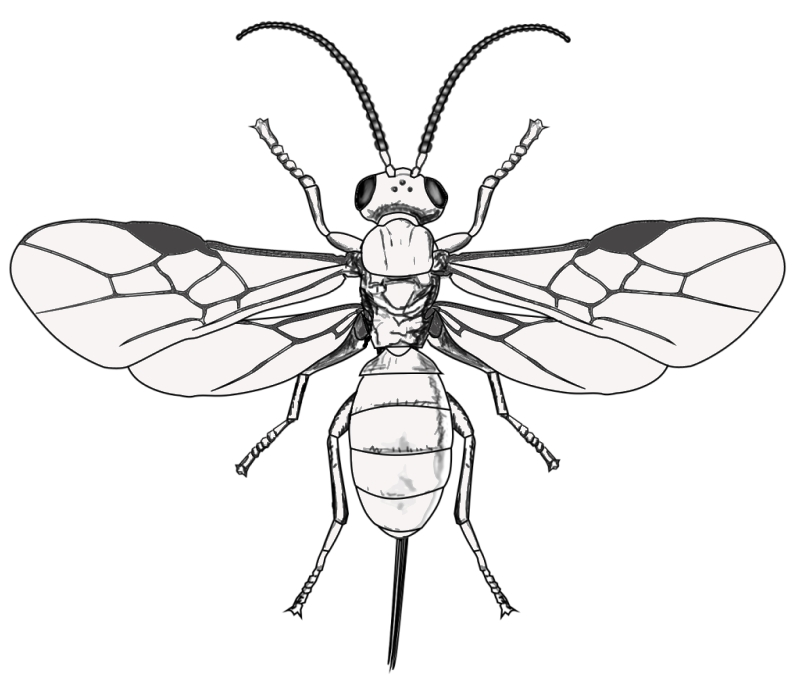

Scientific classification
- Kingdom: Animalia
- Phylum: Arthropoda
- Class: Insecta
- Order: Hymenoptera
- Family: Braconidae
- Subfamily: Opiinae

= Opiinae =

Subfamily of wasps

The Opiinae are a subfamily of braconid parasitoid wasps with over 1300 described species. Several species have been used in biocontrol programs against fruit flies and Agromyzidae flies. They are closely related to the Alysiinae.

== Description and distribution ==
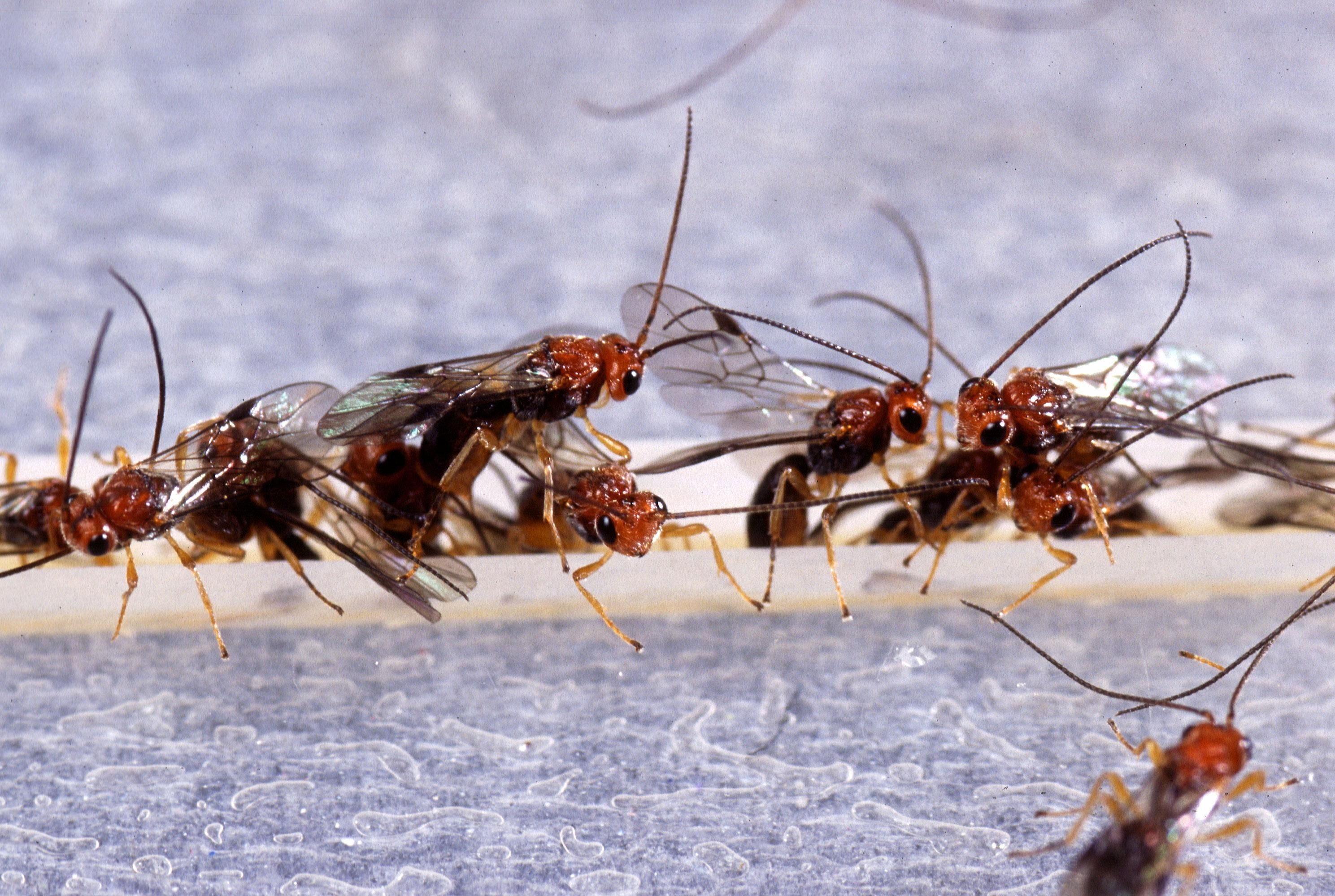
Biosteres arisanus

Opiinae are small wasps, usually under 5mm long. They are non-cyclostomes, but sometimes have the appearance of a cyclostome opening. Unlike Alysiinae, Opiinae have endodont mandibles, which open inwards. Opiinae are found worldwide.

== Biology ==
Opiinae are koinobiont endoparasitoids of cyclorrhaphus Diptera. Females oviposit into host eggs or larvae. The host is allowed to develop until it forms a puparium, at which point it is killed by the wasp larva.
