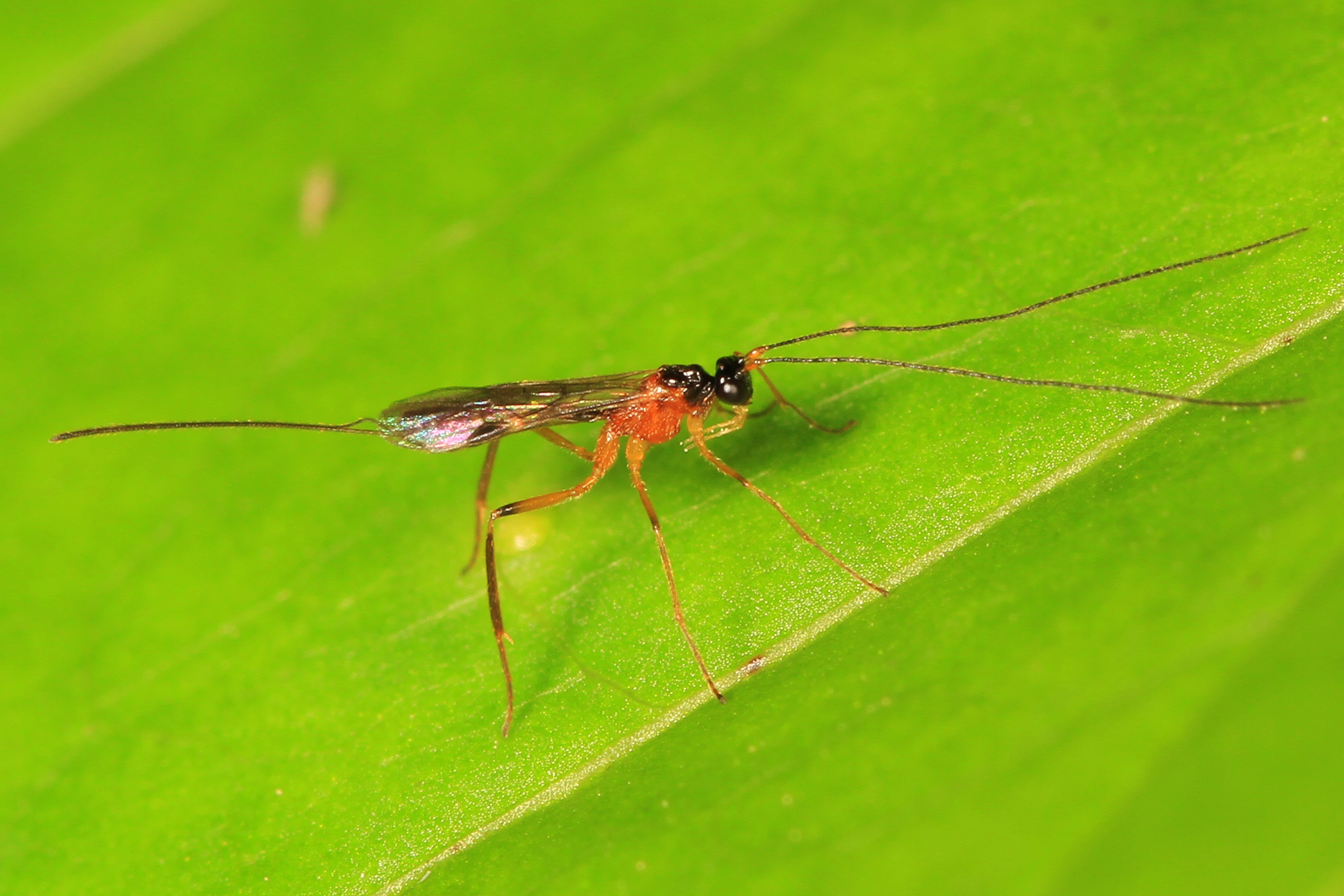

Scientific classification
- Domain: Eukaryota
- Kingdom: Animalia
- Phylum: Arthropoda
- Class: Insecta
- Order: Hymenoptera
- Family: Braconidae
- Subfamily: Macrocentrinae; Förster, 1863

Genera
- Aulacocentrum; Austrozele; Cyclophatnus; Dicranoneura; Dolichozele; Hymenochaonia; Macrocentrus; Rectizele

= Macrocentrinae =

Subfamily of wasps

The Macrocentrinae are a subfamily of braconid parasitic wasps. Several species have been used in biological control programs.

== Description and distribution ==
Macrocentrines are relatively large braconids, recognizable by the presence of small teeth on the trochantellus. Many have pale coloration and nocturnal habits. They belong to the noncyclostome group.

They are found worldwide.

== Biology ==
Macrocentrines include solitary and gregarious koinobiont endoparasitoids of caterpillars.
