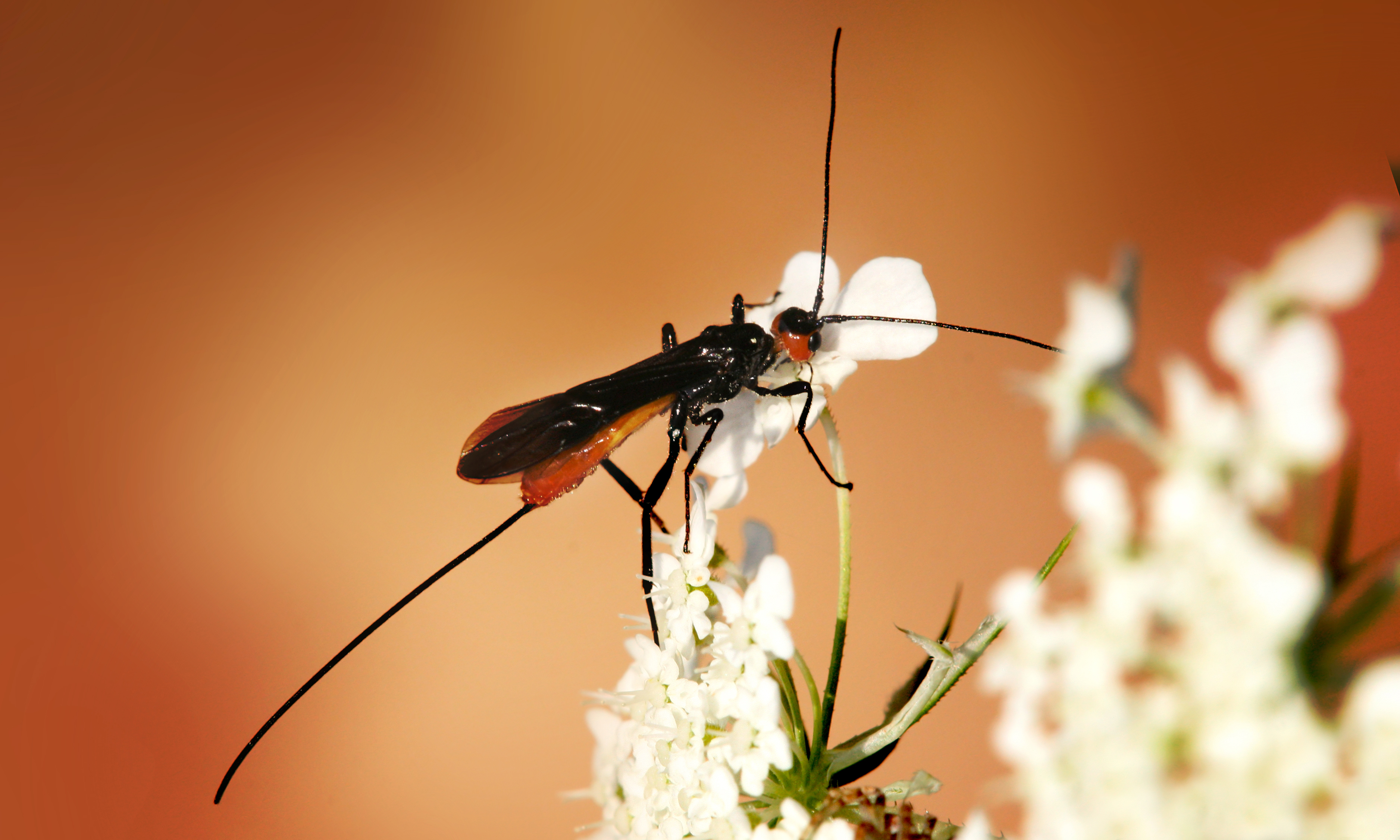
- Atanycolus sp.

Scientific classification
- Kingdom: Animalia
- Phylum: Arthropoda
- Clade: Pancrustacea
- Class: Insecta
- Order: Hymenoptera
- Superfamily: Ichneumonoidea
- Family: Braconidae; Latreille, 1829

Subfamilies
- 47, see text

Synonyms
- Stenophasmidae Benoit, 1949

= Braconidae =

Braconidae Temporal range: Cretaceous–Present

Family of wasps

The Braconidae are a family of parasitoid wasps. After the closely related Ichneumonidae, braconids make up the second-largest family in the order Hymenoptera, with about 17,000 recognized species and many thousands more undescribed. One analysis estimated a total between 30,000 and 50,000, and another provided a narrower estimate between 42,000 and 43,000 species.

A female tropical braconid ovipositing into dead wood

== Classification ==
The Braconidae are currently divided into about 47 subfamilies and over 1000 genera, which include Aerophilus, Aleiodes, Apanteles, Asobara, Bracon, Cenocoelius, Chaenusa, Chorebus, Cotesia, Dacnusa, Diachasma, Dimeris, Microgaster, Opius, Parapanteles, Phaenocarpa, Spathius, and Syntretus.

These fall into two major groups, informally called the cyclostomes and noncyclostomes. In cyclostome braconids, the labrum and the lower part of the clypeus are concave with respect to the upper clypeus and the dorsal margin of the mandibles. These groups may be clades that diverged early in the evolution of braconids. Cyclostomes are monophyletic whereas noncyclostomes can be divided formally into microgastroids, sigalphoids, helconoids, and euphoroids.

The rare Australian subfamily Trachypetinae was raised to family rank in 2020 (as "Trachypetidae"), but was reduced back to a subfamily in 2022.

=== Subfamilies ===
- Acampsohelconinae
- Agathidinae
- Alysiinae
- Amicrocentrinae
- Aphidiinae
- Apozyginae
- Betylobraconinae
- Brachistinae
- Braconinae
- Cardiochilinae
- Cenocoeliinae
- Charmontinae
- Cheloninae
- Dirrhopinae
- Doryctinae
- Ecnomiinae
- Euphorinae
- Exothecinae
- Gnamptodontinae
- Helconinae
- Histeromerinae
- Homolobinae
- Hormiinae
- Ichneutinae
- Khoikhoiiinae
- Lysiterminae
- Macrocentrinae
- Masoninae
- Maxfischeriinae
- Mendesellinae
- Mesostoinae
- Meteorideinae
- Meteorinae
- Microgastrinae
- Microtypinae
- Miracinae
- Neoneurinae
- Opiinae
- Orgilinae
- Pambolinae
- Pselaphaninae
- †Protorhyssalinae
- Rhysipolinae
- Rhyssalinae
- Rogadinae
- †Seneciobraconinae
- Sigalphinae
- Telengaiinae
- Trachypetinae
- Vaepellinae
- Xiphozelinae
- Ypsistocerinae

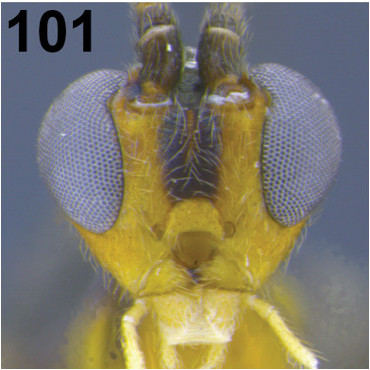
Head of a cyclostome braconid showing circular opening above mandibles.

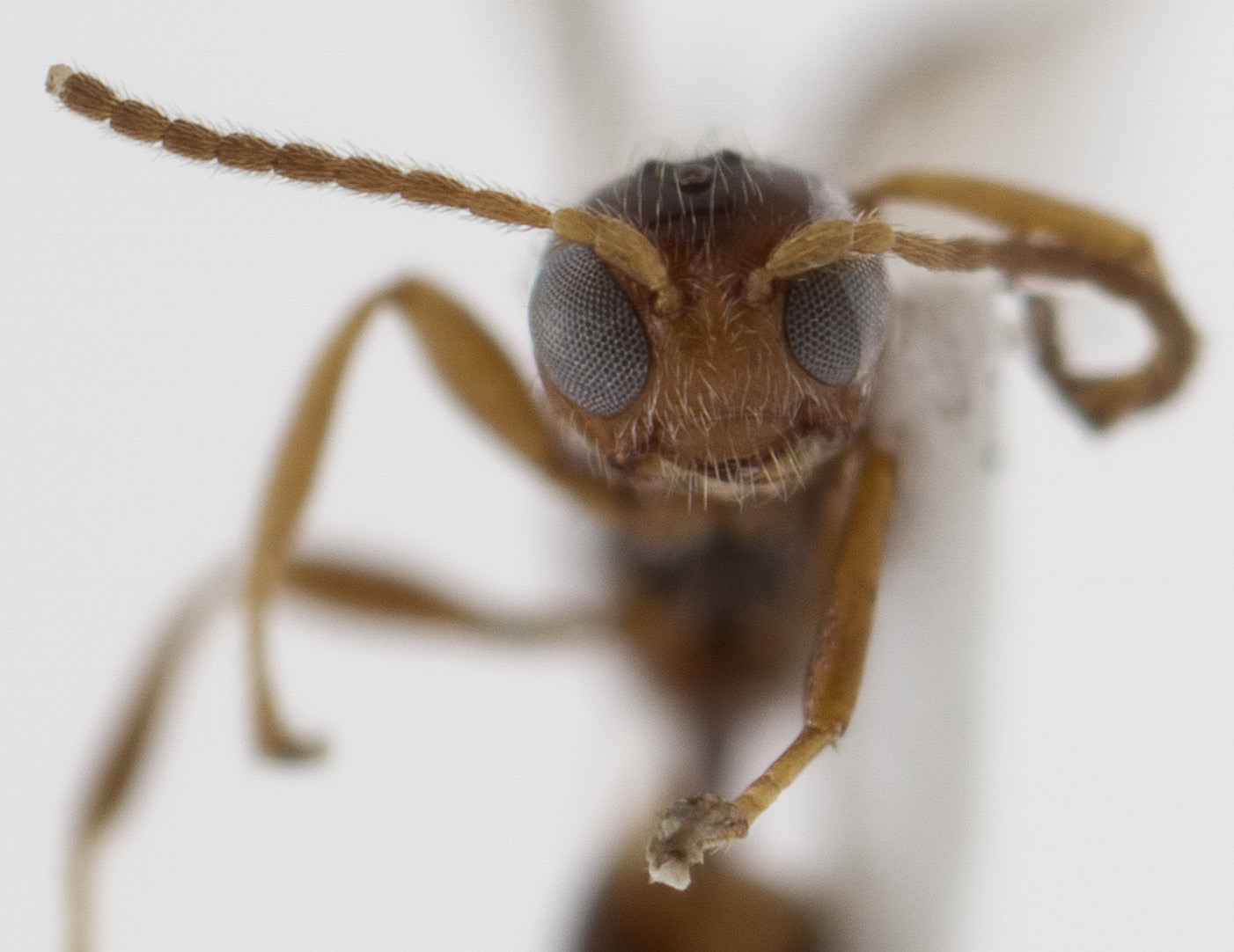
Head of a noncyclostome braconid.

== Morphology ==
The morphological variation among braconids is notable. They are often black-brown (sometimes with reddish markings), though some species exhibit striking coloration and patterns, being parts of Müllerian mimicry complexes. They have one or no recurrent veins, unlike other members of the other family in Ichneumonoidea (Ichneumonidae), which usually have two. Wing venation patterns are otherwise highly variable. The antennae typically have 16 segments or more; the trochanters have two segments.

Females often have long ovipositors, an organ that largely varies interspecifically. This variation is closely related to the host species upon which the wasp deposits its egg. Species that parasitize microlepidopterans, for instance, have longer ovipositors, presumably to reach the caterpillar through layers of plant tissue. Some wasps also have long ovipositors to bypass caterpillar defense mechanisms such as spines or hairs, or to reach deeply-burrowed Coleoptera larvae in tree trunks.

== Life history ==
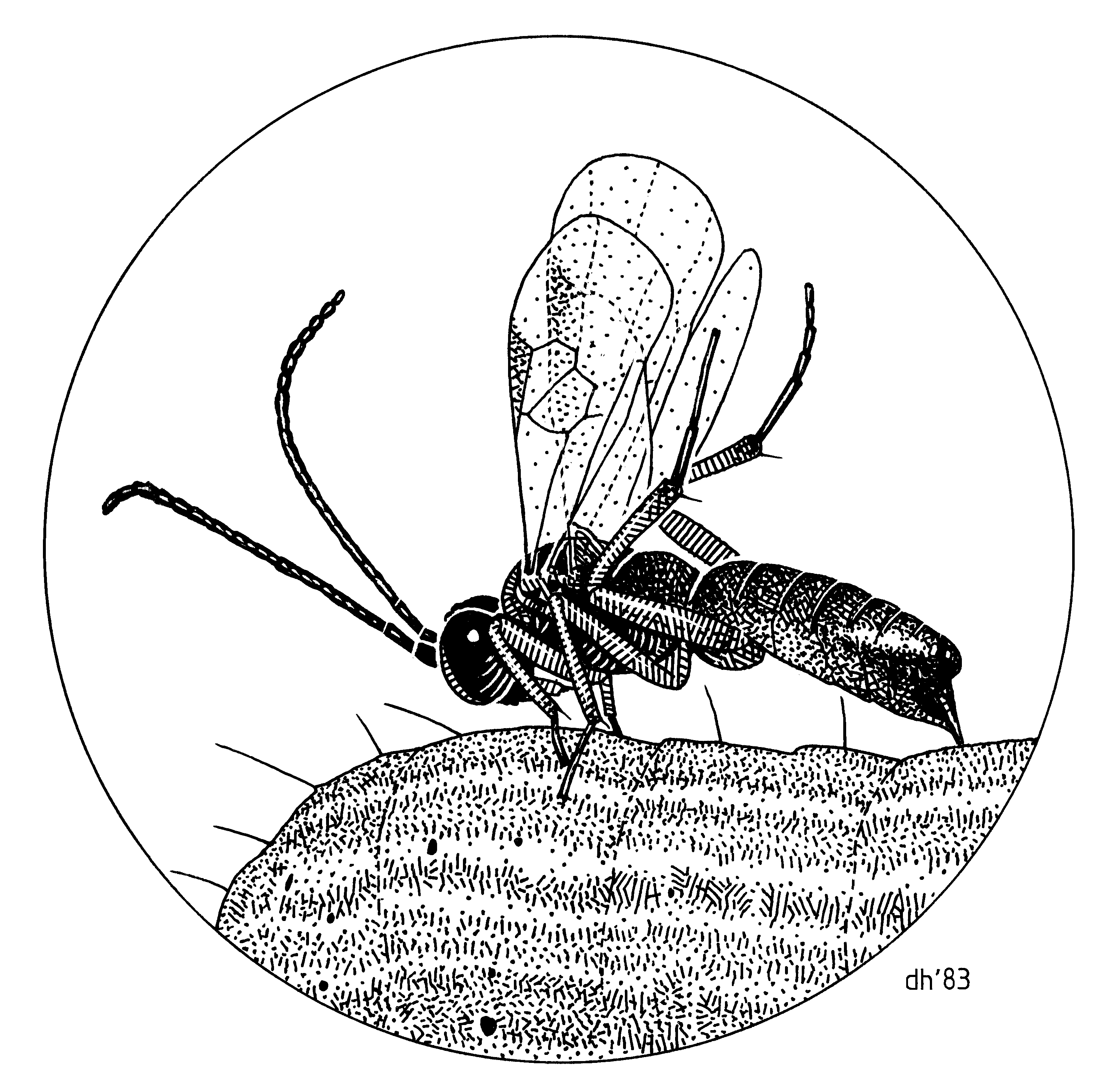
Cotesia ruficrus illustrated by Des Helmore

The larvae of most braconids are internal or external primary parasitoids of other insects, especially the larval stages of Coleoptera, Diptera, and Lepidoptera, but also some hemimetabolous insects such as aphids, Heteroptera, or Embiidina. Most species kill their hosts, though some cause the hosts to become sterile and less active. Parasitoidy on adult insects (particularly on Hemiptera and Coleoptera) also occurs. Members of two subfamilies, the Mesostoinae and Doryctinae are known to form galls on plants. Braconids are often used as biological pest control agents, especially against aphids.

=== Examples of hosts ===
Thousands of species of insects are used as hosts by braconid wasps. A few notable examples are detailed here.

Some species of braconids are parasitoids of Ostrinia furnacalis (the Asian corn borer, a lepidopteran moth known for being a pest of maize in East Asia), the African sugarcane borer (a moth commonly found in sub-Saharan Africa), the butterfly Danaus chrysippus in Ghana, and Liriomyza trifolii (the American serpentine leafminer) and Manduca quinquemaculata (the tomato hornworm) in North America. Braconids often will prey on fruit fly larvae like Anastrepha suspensa as well.

=== Polydnaviruses ===
Endoparasitoid species often display elaborate physiological adaptations to enhance larval survival within the host, such as the co-option of endosymbiotic viruses for compromising host immune defenses. These bracoviruses are often used by the wasps instead of, or in addition to, a venom cocktail. The DNA of the wasp actually contains portions that are the templates for the components of the viral particles and they are assembled in an organ in the female's abdomen known as the calyx. A 2009 study has traced the origins of these templates to a 100-million-year-old viral infection whose alterations to its host DNA provided the necessary basis for these virus-like "templates".

These viruses suppress the immune system and allow the parasitoid to grow inside the host undetected. The exact function and evolutionary history of these viruses are unknown. Sequences of polydnavirus genes show the possibility that venom-like proteins are expressed inside the host caterpillar. Through the evolutionary history of being used by the wasps, these viruses apparently have become so modified, they appear unlike any other known viruses today. Because of this highly modified system of host immunosuppression, a high level of parasitoid-host specificity is not surprising.

== Evolutionary history ==
The family seems to date from early Cretaceous (provided that Eobracon is properly assigned to this family). It underwent extensive diversification from mid or late Cretaceous to early Cenozoic, correlating with the radiation of flowering plants and associated insect herbivores, the main hosts of braconids.

73 individual Braconid fossils of the Königsberg Amber Collection were destroyed during World War II as they were "stored in a salt-mine about 40 km from Göttingen" with petrol. They were set on fire by the Allies. This has arguably slowed the study of the evolution of the family.

== Differentiation from Ichneumonidae ==
Ichneumonidae wing morphology

Braconidae wing morphology

Braconids are distinguished from their sister group Ichneumonidae by these character combinations. In Braconidae, vein 2m-cu of the forewing is absent except in the Chilean species Apozyx penyai – this vein is present in 95% of Ichneumonidae. Vein 1/Rs+M of the forewing is 85% present in Braconidae, but absent in all Ichneumonidae. Vein 1r-m of the hind wing is in 95% of Braconidae basal to the separation of R1 and Rs (it is opposite or apical in Ichneumonidae). In Braconidae, metasomal tergum 2 is fused with tergum 3, (secondarily flexible in Aphidiinae) – 90% of Ichneumonidae have a flexible suture.

== Other characteristics ==
The species Microplitis croceipes possesses an extremely accurate sense of smell and can be trained for use in narcotics and explosives detection.

At least some braconids appear to be very resistant to ionizing radiation. While a dose of 400 to 1000 rads can kill an average human, a dose of 180,000 rads was required to kill a braconid of genus Habrobracon in an experiment.

== Gallery ==
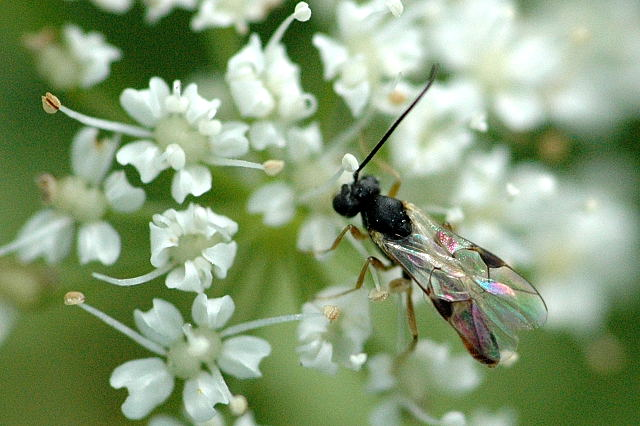
Cotesia melanoscela

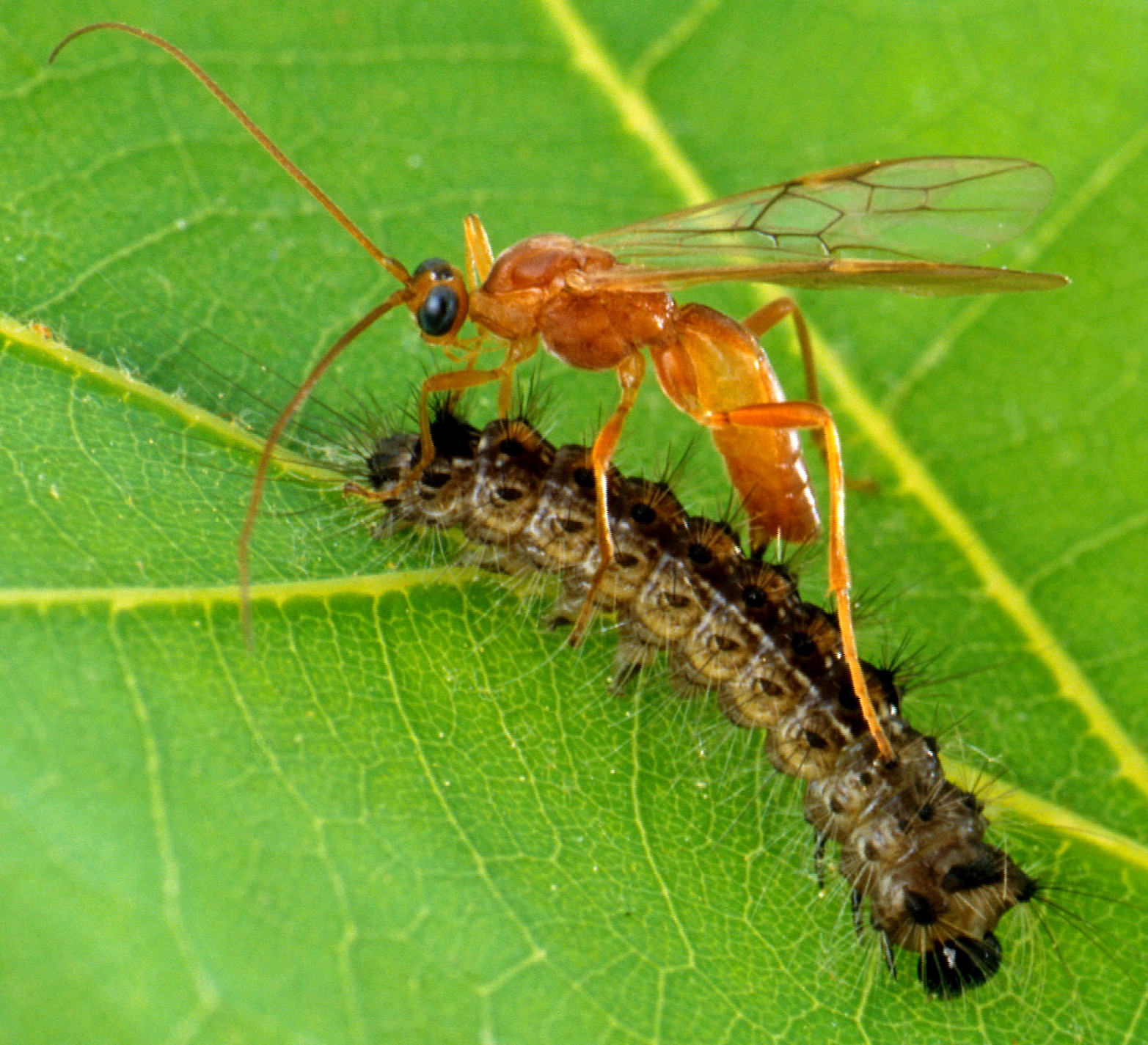
Aleiodes indiscretus ovipositing in its host, a spongy moth caterpillar

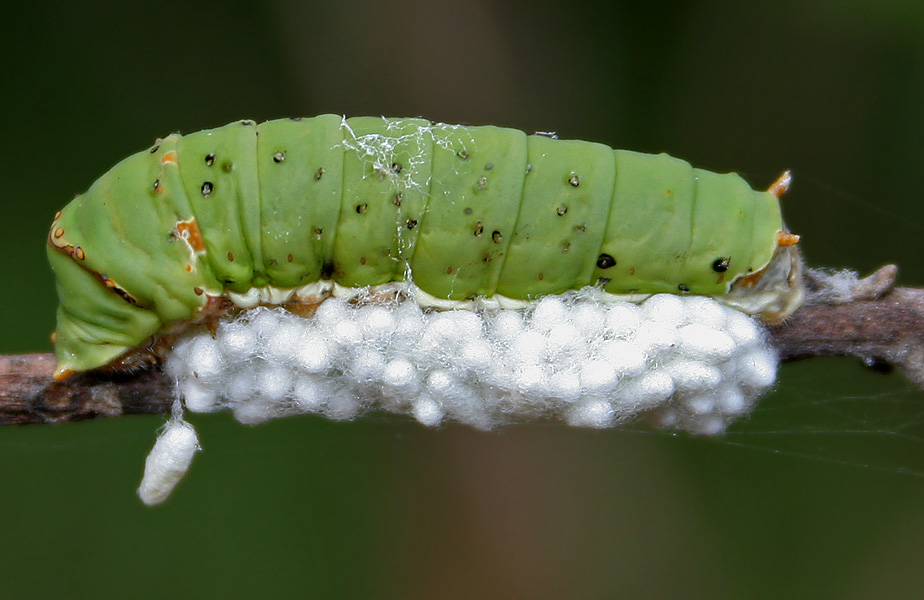
Apanteles sp. cocoons on Papilio demoleus

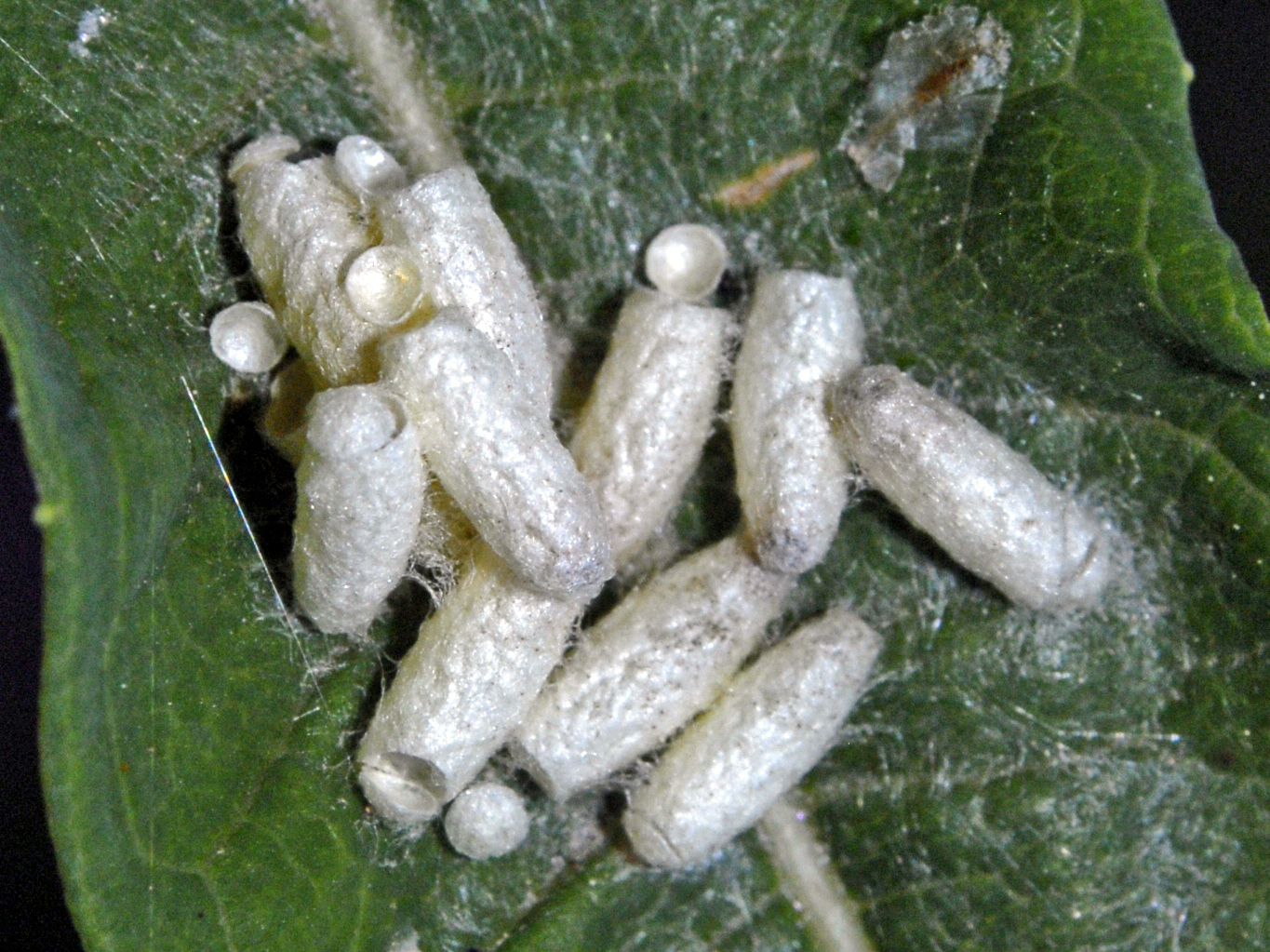
Braconid wasp empty cocoons

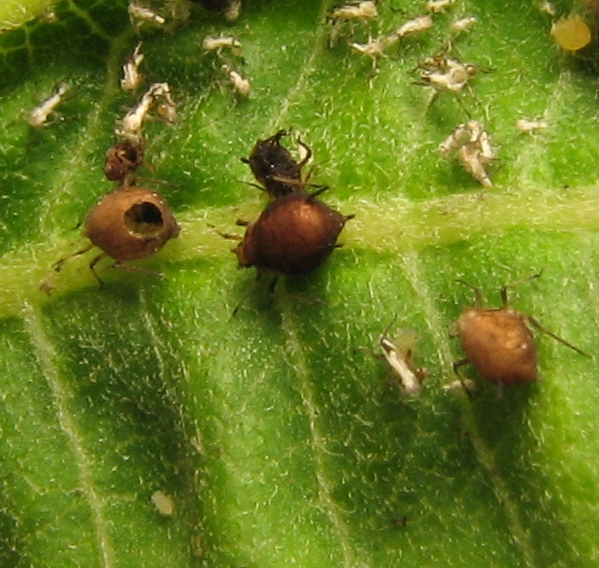
Aphis nerii parasitized by Aphidiinae, possibly Lysiphlebus.

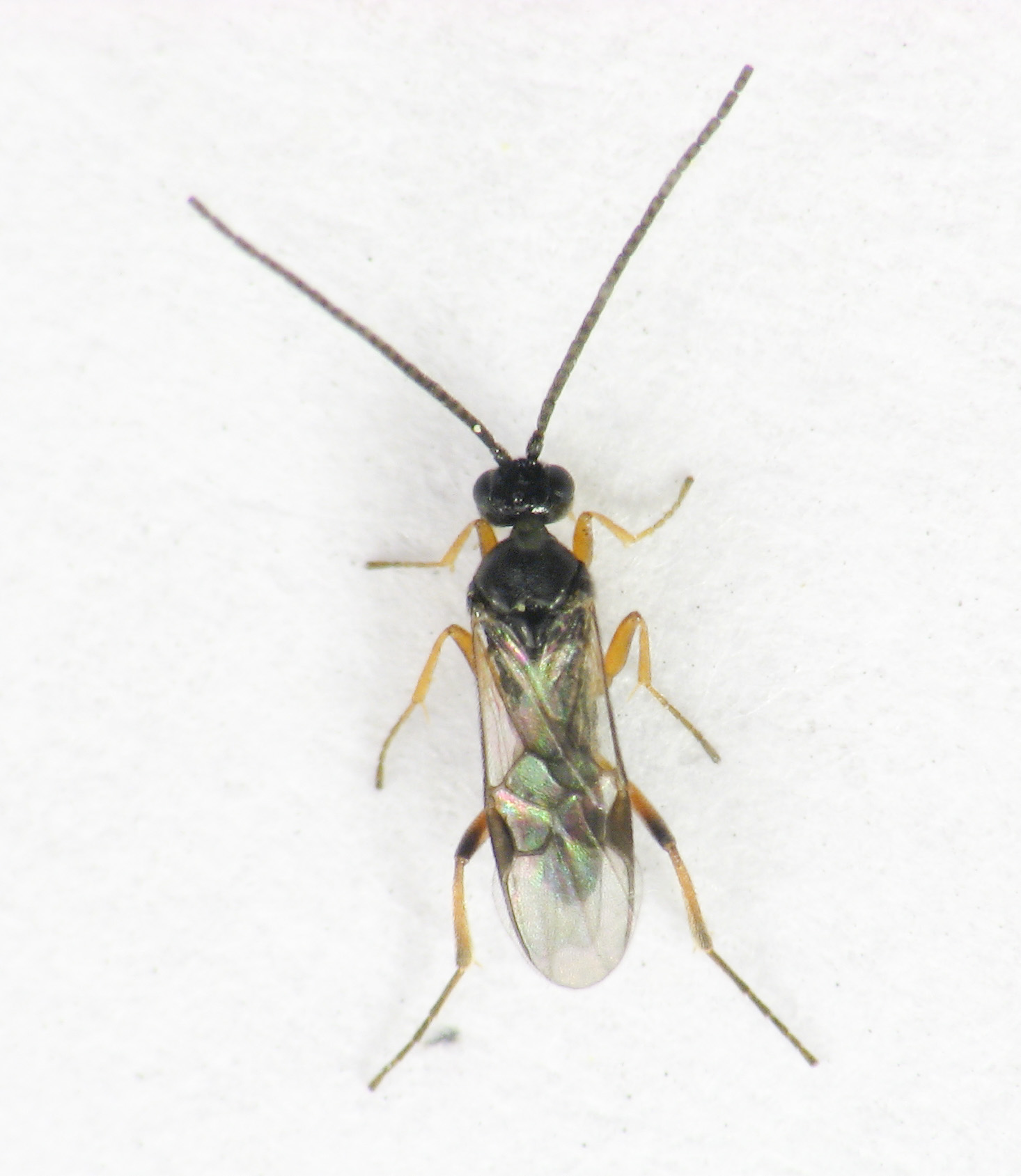
Cotesia adult
