= Bracovirus =

Virus classification
- (unranked): Viriform
- Family: Polydnaviriformidae
- Genus: Bracoviriform

Synonyms
- Bracoviriform: Bracoviriform ICTV 2021; Bracovirus ICTV 1990; Polydnavirus ICTV 1984

Genus of viruses

Bracovirus is a genus of viruses, in the family Polydnaviridae. Bracoviruses are an ancient symbiotic virus contained in parasitic braconid wasps that evolved from the nudivirus approximately 190 million years ago and has been evolving for at least 100 million years. It is one of two genera belonging to the Polydnaviridae family, with Ichnovirus being the other genus. There are 32 species in this genus.

== Symbiosis ==
Parasitoid wasps in the subfamilies Microgastrinae, Miracinae, Cheloninae, Cardiochilinae, Khoikhoiinae, and Mendesellinae are the natural hosts for Bracoviruses, though the virus does not cause disease in these wasps. Instead, the wasps are themselves parasites of lepidoptera. The wasp injects one or more eggs into its lepidoptera host along with a quantity of virus. The virus does not replicate inside the wasp's host, but expression of viral genes prevents its immune system from killing the wasp's egg and causes other physiological alterations that ultimately cause the parasitized host to die. Studies conducted on Cotesia congregata have shown that male wasps do contain proviral sequences of DNA, but the females are the ones responsible for the amplification of the viral DNA.

== Taxonomy ==
The genus Bracovirus contained the 32 species in ICTV versions 1999a-2020 The genus Bracoviriform contains the following 31 species starting ICTV version 2021 The species Ichnoviriform rostralis, previously known as Tranosema rostrale bracovirus was moved to Ichnoviriform (Ichnovirus) from Bracoviriform (Bracovirus) in 2021.

Species	Previous name, Virus name	Abbreviation
Bracoviriform altitudinis	Chelonus altitudinis bracovirus	CalBV
Bracoviriform argentifrontis	Ascogaster argentifrons bracovirus	AaBV
Bracoviriform blackburni	Chelonus blackburni bracovirus	CbBV
Bracoviriform canadense	Hypomicrogaster canadensis bracovirus	HcBV
Bracoviriform congregatae	Cotesia congregata bracovirus	CcBV
Bracoviriform crassicornis	Apanteles crassicornis bracovirus	AcBV
Bracoviriform croceipedis	Microplitis croceipes bracovirus	McBV
Bracoviriform curvimaculati	Chelonus nr. curvimaculatus bracovirus	CcBV
Bracoviriform demolitoris	Microplitis demolitor bracovirus	MdBV
Bracoviriform ectdytolophae	Hypomicrogaster ectdytolophae bracovirus	HcEV
Bracoviriform facetosae	Diolcogaster facetosa bracovirus	DfBV
Bracoviriform flavicoxis	Glyptapanteles flavicoxis bracovirus	GflBV
Bracoviriform flavipedis	Cotesia flavipes bracovirus	CfBV
Bracoviriform flavitestaceae	Phanerotoma flavitestacea bracovirus	PfBV
Bracoviriform fumiferanae	Apanteles fumiferanae bracovirus	AfBV
Bracoviriform glomeratae	Cotesia glomerata bracovirus	CgBV
Bracoviriform hyphantriae	Cotesia hyphantriae bracovirus	ChBV
Bracoviriform inaniti	Chelonus inanitus bracovirus	CinaBV
Bracoviriform indiense	Glyptapanteles indiensis bracovirus	GiBV
Bracoviriform insularis	Chelonus insularis bracovirus	CinsBV
Bracoviriform kariyai	Cotesia kariyai bracovirus	CkBV
Bracoviriform liparidis	Glyptapanteles liparidis bracovirus	GlBV
Bracoviriform marginiventris	Cotesia marginiventris bracovirus	CmaBV
Bracoviriform melanoscelae	Cotesia melanoscela bracovirus	CmeBV
Bracoviriform nigricipitis	Cardiochiles nigriceps bracovirus	CnBV
Bracoviriform ornigis	Pholetesor ornigis bracovirus	PoBV
Bracoviriform paleacritae	Protapanteles paleacritae bracovirus	PpBV
Bracoviriform quadridentatae	Ascogaster quadridentata bracovirus	AqBV
Bracoviriform rubeculae	Cotesia rubecula bracovirus	CrBV
Bracoviriform schaeferi	Cotesia schaeferi bracovirus	CsBV
Bracoviriform texani	Chelonus texanus bracovirus	CtBV

== Structure ==
Viruses in Bracovirus are enveloped, with prolate ellipsoid and cylindrical geometries. Genomes are circular and segmented, around 2.0-31kb in length. The genome of the virus is enveloped with 35 double stranded DNA (dsDNA) all of which are circular.

Genus	Structure	Symmetry	Capsid	Genomic arrangement	Genomic segmentation
Bracovirus	Prolate ellipsoid		Enveloped	Circular	Segmented

== Life cycle ==
Viral replication is nuclear. DNA-templated transcription is the method of transcription. The virus exits the host cell by nuclear pore export. Transmission routes are parental.

The replication of the Bracoviriform occurs within the ovaries of a parasitic wasps in calyx cells and is maintained by vertical transmission and to go into further detail the packaged genome of dsDNA is replicated inside of the wasp ovaries by development of the sequences of the virus from proviral segments in the tandem arrays in the wasp genome. The development of the sequences of Bracoviriform shows head-to-head and tail-to-tail sequences, which is unexpected, given that it has evolved from the nudivirus The research conducted on Cotesia congregata shows that the viral genome contains one to three proviral segments.

The virus like particle is transmitted into a lepidopteran host (a caterpillar) and infects and manipulates the physiology of the caterpillar so that it can be used as a living incubator for wasp larvae. When this happens the virus disrupts the caterpillar's immune system causing paralysis and inhibiting the pupating of the host. The arresting of the host increases the chance of success of the wasp larva developing successfully.

Genus	Host details	Tissue tropism	Entry details	Release details	Replication site	Assembly site	Transmission
Bracoviriform	Parasitoid wasps (Braconidae)	Hemocytes; fat bodies	Unknown	Lysis; budding	Nucleus	Nucleus	Unknown
