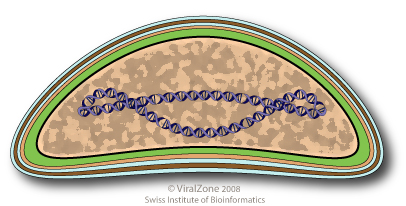

Virus classification
- (unranked): Virus
- Realm: Varidnaviria
- Kingdom: Bamfordvirae
- Phylum: Nucleocytoviricota
- Class: Megaviricetes
- Order: Pimascovirales
- Family: Ascoviridae

Genera
- Ascovirus; Toursvirus

= Ascoviridae =

Family of viruses

Ascoviridae is a family of double strand DNA viruses that infect primarily invertebrates, mainly noctuids and spodoptera species. The family contains two genera: Ascovirus and Toursvirus.

== Taxonomy ==
The family contains the following genera and species:

- Ascovirus
  - Ascovirus hvav3a
  - Ascovirus sfav1a
  - Ascovirus tnav2a
- Toursvirus
  - Toursvirus dptv1a

== Genome ==
Genome

The genome is not segmented and contains a single molecule of circular double-stranded DNA. The genome has a guanine + cytosine content of 42-60%.

The genome of Spodoptera frugiperda ascovirus 1a has been sequenced. It is 156,922 bases in length and encodes 123 putative open reading frames. The G+C ratio is 49.2%. Among the encoded proteins are a caspase, a cathepsin B, several kinases, E3 ubiquitin ligases, a fatty acid elongase, a sphingomyelinase, a phosphate acyltransferase and a patatin-like phospholipase.

== Virology ==
The virions consist of an envelope, a core, and an internal lipid membrane associated with the inner particle. The virus capsid is enveloped and measures 130 nm in diameter, and 200-240 nm in length. Virions are bacilliform, ovoid, and allantoid.

Genus	Structure	Symmetry	Capsid	Genomic arrangement	Genomic segmentation
Ascovirus	Bacilliform, ovoidal or allantoid		Enveloped	Circular	Monopartite

These viruses infect immature stages of the order Lepidoptera, in which they cause a chronic, fatal disease. They are transmissed by endoparasitic wasps and the host develops a unique cytopathology that resembles apoptosis. Cell infection induces apoptosis and in some species is associated with synthesis of a virus-encoded executioner caspase and several lipid-metabolizing enzymes. After infection the host cell DNA is degraded, the nucleus fragments and the cell then cleaves into large virion-containing vesicles. Synthesis of viral proteins results in the rescue of developing apoptotic bodies that are converted into large vesicles in which virions accumulate and continue to assemble. In infected larvae, millions of these virion-containing vesicles begin to disperse from infected tissues 48–72 hours after infection into the haemolymph, making it milky white, a characteristic of this disease. The circulation of virions and vesicles in the blood facilitates mechanical transmission by parasitic wasps.

Genus	Host details	Tissue tropism	Entry details	Release details	Replication site	Assembly site	Transmission
Ascovirus	Insects: Noctuids	Most	Cell receptor endocytosis	Cleavage	Nucleus	Cytoplasm	Mechanical

== Evolution ==
Ascoviruses evolved from iridoviruses (family Iridoviridae) that also attack lepidopteran larvae. Furthermore, ascoviruses have been suggested as the evolutionary source of ichnoviruses (family Polydnaviridae), although other studies have not been able to confirm this link.
