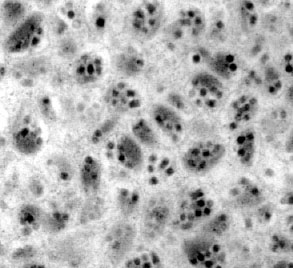
- Electron micrograph of a bracovirus

Virus classification
- Informal group: Subviral agents
- Informal group: Viriforms
- Family: Polydnaviriformidae

Genera
- Bracoviriform; Ichnoviriform

Synonyms
- Polydnaviriformidae ICTV 2021; Polydnaviridae ICTV 1984

= Polydnaviriformidae =

Polydnavirus

Family of viruses

Polydnaviriformidae (/pɒˈlɪdnəvɪrəˌfɔːmɪdɛ/ PDV) is a family of insect viriforms; members are known as polydnaviruses. There are two genera in the family: Bracoviriform and Ichnoviriform. Polydnaviruses form a mutualistic relationship with parasitoid wasps. Ichnoviriforms (IV) occur in Ichneumonid wasps and Bracoviriforms (BV) in Braconid wasps. The larvae of wasps in both of those groups are themselves parasitic on Lepidoptera (moths and butterflies), and the polydnaviruses are important in circumventing the immune response of their parasitized hosts. Little or no sequence homology exists between BV and IV, suggesting that the two genera have been evolving independently for a long time.

== Taxonomy ==
Bracoviriform

- Bracoviriform altitudinis
- Bracoviriform argentifrontis
- Bracoviriform blackburni
- Bracoviriform canadense
- Bracoviriform congregatae
- Bracoviriform crassicornis
- Bracoviriform croceipedis
- Bracoviriform curvimaculati
- Bracoviriform demolitoris
- Bracoviriform ectdytolophae
- Bracoviriform facetosae
- Bracoviriform flavicoxis
- Bracoviriform flavipedis
- Bracoviriform flavitestaceae
- Bracoviriform fumiferanae
- Bracoviriform glomeratae
- Bracoviriform hyphantriae
- Bracoviriform inaniti
- Bracoviriform indiense
- Bracoviriform insularis
- Bracoviriform kariyai
- Bracoviriform liparidis
- Bracoviriform marginiventris
- Bracoviriform melanoscelae
- Bracoviriform nigricipitis
- Bracoviriform ornigis
- Bracoviriform paleacritae
- Bracoviriform quadridentatae
- Bracoviriform rubeculae
- Bracoviriform schaeferi
- Bracoviriform texani

Ichnoviriform

- Ichnoviriform acronyctae
- Ichnoviriform annulipedis
- Ichnoviriform aprilis
- Ichnoviriform arjunae
- Ichnoviriform benefactoris
- Ichnoviriform eribori
- Ichnoviriform exiguae
- Ichnoviriform flavicinctae
- Ichnoviriform forcipatae
- Ichnoviriform fugitivi
- Ichnoviriform fumiferanae
- Ichnoviriform geniculatae
- Ichnoviriform infestae
- Ichnoviriform interrupti
- Ichnoviriform lymantriae
- Ichnoviriform montani
- Ichnoviriform pilosuli
- Ichnoviriform rivalis
- Ichnoviriform rostralis
- Ichnoviriform sonorense
- Ichnoviriform tenuifemoris
- Ichnoviriform terebrantis

== Structure ==
Viruses in Polydnaviridae are enveloped, with prolate ellipsoid and cylindrical geometries. Genomes are circular and segmented, composed of multiple segments of double-stranded, superhelical DNA packaged in capsid proteins. They are around 2.0–31kb in length.

Genus	Structure	Symmetry	Capsid	Genomic arrangement	Genomic segmentation
Ichnoviriform	Prolate ellipsoid		Enveloped	Circular	Segmented
Bracoviriform	Prolate ellipsoid		Enveloped	Circular	Segmented

== Life cycle ==
Viral replication is nuclear. DNA-templated transcription is the method of transcription. The virus exits the host cell by nuclear pore export.

Parasitoid wasps serve as hosts for the virus, and Lepidoptera serve as hosts for these wasps. The female wasp injects one or more eggs into its host along with a quantity of virus. The virus and wasp are in a mutualistic symbiotic relationship: expression of viral genes prevents the wasp's host's immune system from killing the wasp's injected egg and causes other physiological alterations that ultimately cause the parasitized host to die. Transmission routes are parental.

Genus	Host details	Tissue tropism	Entry details	Release details	Replication site	Assembly site	Transmission
Ichnoviriform	Parasitoid wasps (Ichneumonidae)	Hemocytes; fat bodies	Unknown	Budding through cell membrane	Nucleus	Nucleus	Unknown
Bracoviriform	Parasitoid wasps (Braconidae)	Hemocytes; fat bodies	Unknown	Lysis	Nucleus	Nucleus	Unknown

== Biology ==
Diagram of a PDV host association

These viruses are part of a unique biological system consisting of an endoparasitic wasp (parasitoid), a host (usually lepidopteran) larva, and the virus. The full genome of the virus is endogenous, dispersed among the genome of the wasp. The virus only replicates in a particular part of the ovary, called the calyx, of pupal and adult female wasps. The virus is injected along with the wasp egg into the body cavity of a lepidopteran host caterpillar and infects cells of the caterpillar. The infection does not lead to replication of new viruses; rather, it affects the caterpillar's immune system, as the virion carries virulence genes instead of viral replication genes. It can be considered a type of viral vector.

Without the virus infection, phagocytic hemocytes (blood cells) will encapsulate and kill the wasp egg and larvae, but the immune suppression caused by the virus allows survival of the wasp egg and larvae, leading to hatching and complete development of the immature wasp in the caterpillar. Additionally, genes expressed from the polydnavirus in the parasitised host alter host development and metabolism to be beneficial for the growth and survival of the parasitoid larva.

=== Potential carrier subfamilies ===
- Ichneumonoidea
  - Braconidae
    - Microgastrinae
    - Miracinae
    - Cheloninae
    - Cardiochilinae
    - Mendeselinae
    - Khoikhoiinae
  - Ichneumonidae
    - Campopleginae
    - Banchinae

== Characteristics ==
Both genera of PDV share certain characteristics:

- the virus particles of each contain multiple segments of dsDNA (double-strand, or "normal" DNA, as contrasted with positive- or negative-sense single-strand DNA or RNA, as found in some other viruses) with each segment containing only part of the full genome (much like chromosomes in eukaryotic organisms)
- the genome of the virus has eukaryotic characteristics such as the presence of introns (common for insect genes but rare for viruses) and a low coding density
- the genome of each virus is integrated into the host wasp genome
- the genome is organized in several multiple-member genes families (which differ between Bracoviruses and Ichnoviruses)
- the virus particles are only produced in specific cell types in the female wasp's reproductive organs

The morphologies of the two genera are different when observed by electron microscopy. Ichnoviruses tend to be ovoid while bracoviruses are short rods. The virions of Bracoviruses are released by cell lysis; the virions of Ichnoviruses are released by budding.

== Evolution ==
Nucleic acid analysis suggests a very long association of the viruses with the wasps (estimated 73.7 million years ± 10 million).

=== Older wasp-derived theory ===
Two proposals have been advanced for how the wasp/virus association developed. The first suggests that the virus is derived from wasp genes. Many parasitoids that do not use PDVs inject proteins that provide many of the same functions, that is, a suppression of the immune response to the parasite egg. In this model, the braconid and ichneumonid wasps packaged genes for these functions into the viruses—essentially creating a gene-transfer system that results in the caterpillar producing the immune-suppressing factors. In this scenario, the PDV structural proteins (capsids) were probably "borrowed" from existing viruses.

=== Current endogenous virus theory ===
The alternative proposal suggests that ancestral wasps developed a beneficial association with an existing virus that eventually led to an endogenization of the virus into the wasp's genome. Following integration, the genes responsible for virus replication and the capsids were (eventually) no longer included in the PDV genome. This hypothesis is supported by the distinct morphology differences between IV and BV, suggesting different ancestral viruses for the two genera. BV has likely evolved from a nudivirus, specifically a betanudivirus, ~100 million years ago. IV has a less clear origin: although earlier reports found a protein p44/p53 with structural similarities to ascovirus, the link was not confirmed in later studies. As a result, the current opinion is that IV originated from a yet-unidentified novel viral family, with a weak link to the NCLDVs. In either case, both genera were formed through a single integration event in their respective wasp lineages.

The two groups of viruses in the family are not in fact phylogenetically related suggesting that this taxon may need revision.

== Effect on host immunity ==
In the host, several mechanisms of the insect immune system can be triggered when the wasp lays its eggs and when the parasitic wasp is developing. When a large body (wasp egg or small particle used experimentally) is introduced into an insect's body, the classic immune reaction is the encapsulation by hematocytes. An encapsulated body can also be melanised in order to asphyxiate it, thanks to another type of hemocyte, which uses the phenoloxidase pathway to produce melanin. Small particles can be phagocytosed, and macrophage cells can then be also melanised in a nodule. Finally, insects can also respond with production of antiviral peptides.

PolyDNAvirus protect the hymenopteran larvae from the host immune system, acting at different levels.

- First they can disable or destroy hematocytes. The polyDNAvirus associated with Cotesia rubecula, code for a protein CrV1 that denatures actin filaments in hematocytes, so those cells become less able to move and adhere to the larvae. Microplitis demolitor Bracovirus (MdBV) induce apoptosis of hematocytes, thanks to its gene PTP-H2. It also decreases the adhesion capacity of hematocytes, thanks to its gene Glc1.8. The gene also inhibits phagocytosis.
- PolyDNAvirus can also act on melanisation, MdBV interferes with the production of phenoloxidase.
- Finally, polyDNAvirus can also produce viral ankyrins, that interfere with production of antiviral peptides. In some Ichnoviruses, Vankyrin can also prevent apoptosis, the extreme reaction of a cell to block viral propagation.
- The Ichnoviruses produce some proteins called vinnexins which have been recognized as homologous to the innexins of insects. They are responsible for the encoding of the structural units of the gap-junctions. These proteins may alter the intercellular communication which could explain the disruption of the encapsidation process.

== Virus-like particles ==
Another strategy used by parasitoid Hymenoptera to protect their offspring is production of virus-like particles. VLPs are similar to viruses in their structure, but they don't carry any nucleic acid. For example, Venturia canescens (Ichneumonidea) and Leptopilina sp. (Figitidae) produce VLPs.

VLPs can be compared to PolyDNAvirus because they are secreted in the same way, and they both act to protect the larvae against the host's immune system. V. canescens-VLPs (VcVLP1, VcVLP2, VcNEP ...) are produced in the calyx cells before they go to the oviducts. Work in 2006 did not find their link to any viruses and assumed a cellular origin. More recent comparison links them to highly reshuffled domesticated Nudivirus sequences. This link produces the name Venturia canescens endogenous nudivirus (VcENV), an alphanudivirus closely related to NlENV found in Nilaparvata lugens.

VLPs protect the Hymenoptera larvae locally, whereas polyDNAvirus can have a more global effect. VLPs allow the larvae to escape the immune system: the larva is not recognised as harmful by its host, or the immune cells can't interact with it thanks to the VLPs. Venturia canescens uses these instead of polydnaviruses because its ichnovirus has been deactivated.

The wasp Leptopilina heterotoma secrete VLPs that are able to penetrate into the lamellocytes, thanks to specific receptors, and then modify the shape and surface properties of the lamellocytes so they become inefficient and the larvae are safe from encapsulation. The Leptopilina VLPs or mixed-strategy extracellular vesicles (MSEVs) contain some secretion systems. Their evolutionary picture is less clear, but a recently reported virus, L. boulardi Filamentous Virus (LbFV), shows significant similarities.

== Micro-RNA ==
MicroRNA are small RNA fragments produced in the host cells thanks to a specific enzymatic mechanism. They promote viral RNA destruction. MicroRNA attach to viral-RNA because they are complementary. Then the complex is recognised by an enzyme that destroys it. This phenomenon is known as PTGS (for post transcriptional gene silencing) or RNAi (RNA interference.)

It is interesting to consider the microRNA phenomenon in the polyDNAvirus context. Many hypotheses can be formulated:

- Braconidae carry nudivirus-related genes in their genome, so they may be able to produce microRNA against nudivirus, as an innate immunity.
- Wasps perhaps use microRNA to control the viral genes they carry.
- PolyDNAvirus can also use PTGS to interfere with the host's gene expression.
- PTGS is also used for organisms' development, using the same enzymes as antiviral gene silencing, so we can imagine that if the host uses PTGS against polyDNAvirus, perhaps it also affects its development.

== See also ==
- Mutualism
