= Adelius determinatus =

Scientific classification
- Kingdom: Animalia
- Phylum: Arthropoda
- Class: Insecta
- Order: Hymenoptera
- Family: Braconidae
- Genus: Adelius
- Species: A. determinatus

Binomial name
- Adelius determinatus (Förster, 1851)

Synonyms
- Acoelius determinatus; Pleiomerus concinnus

Species of insect

Adelius determinatus is a hymenopteran parasitoid in the family Braconidae. It occurs in central Europe.

== Hosts ==
- Ectoedemia argyropeza (on Populus nigra)
