= Adelius clandestinus =

Scientific classification
- Kingdom: Animalia
- Phylum: Arthropoda
- Class: Insecta
- Order: Hymenoptera
- Family: Braconidae
- Genus: Adelius
- Species: A. clandestinus

Binomial name
- Adelius clandestinus (Förster, 1851)

Synonyms
- Acoelius clandestinus; Pleiomerus concinnus

Species of insect

Adelius clandestinus is a hymenopteran parasitoid in the family Braconidae. It is a solitary endoparasitoid of larvae of micromoths in the family Nepticulidae. It has also been reported from a cecidomyiid fly. It occurs from southern France to northern Sweden to the east coast of Russia.

== Hosts ==
- Ectoedemia louisella
- Ectoedemia septembrella (on Hypericum perforatum)
- Ectoedemia sericopeza
- Rabdophaga rosaria
- Stigmella obliquella
