= Cardiochiles =

Scientific classification
- Kingdom: Animalia
- Phylum: Arthropoda
- Class: Insecta
- Order: Hymenoptera
- Family: Braconidae
- Subfamily: Cardiochilinae
- Genus: Cardiochiles; Nees von Esenbeck, 1818

Genus of insects

Cardiochiles is a genus of insects belonging to the family Braconidae.

The genus has almost cosmopolitan distribution.

Species include:

- Cardiochiles aethiops (Cresson, 1873)
- Cardiochiles alboannulatus Telenga, 1955
