= Chelonus elegans =

Scientific classification
- Domain: Eukaryota
- Kingdom: Animalia
- Phylum: Arthropoda
- Class: Insecta
- Order: Hymenoptera
- Family: Braconidae
- Genus: Chelonus
- Species: C. elegans

Binomial name
- Chelonus elegans Nees v. E., 1834

Species of wasp

Chelonus elegans is a species of wasp in the family Cheloninae.
