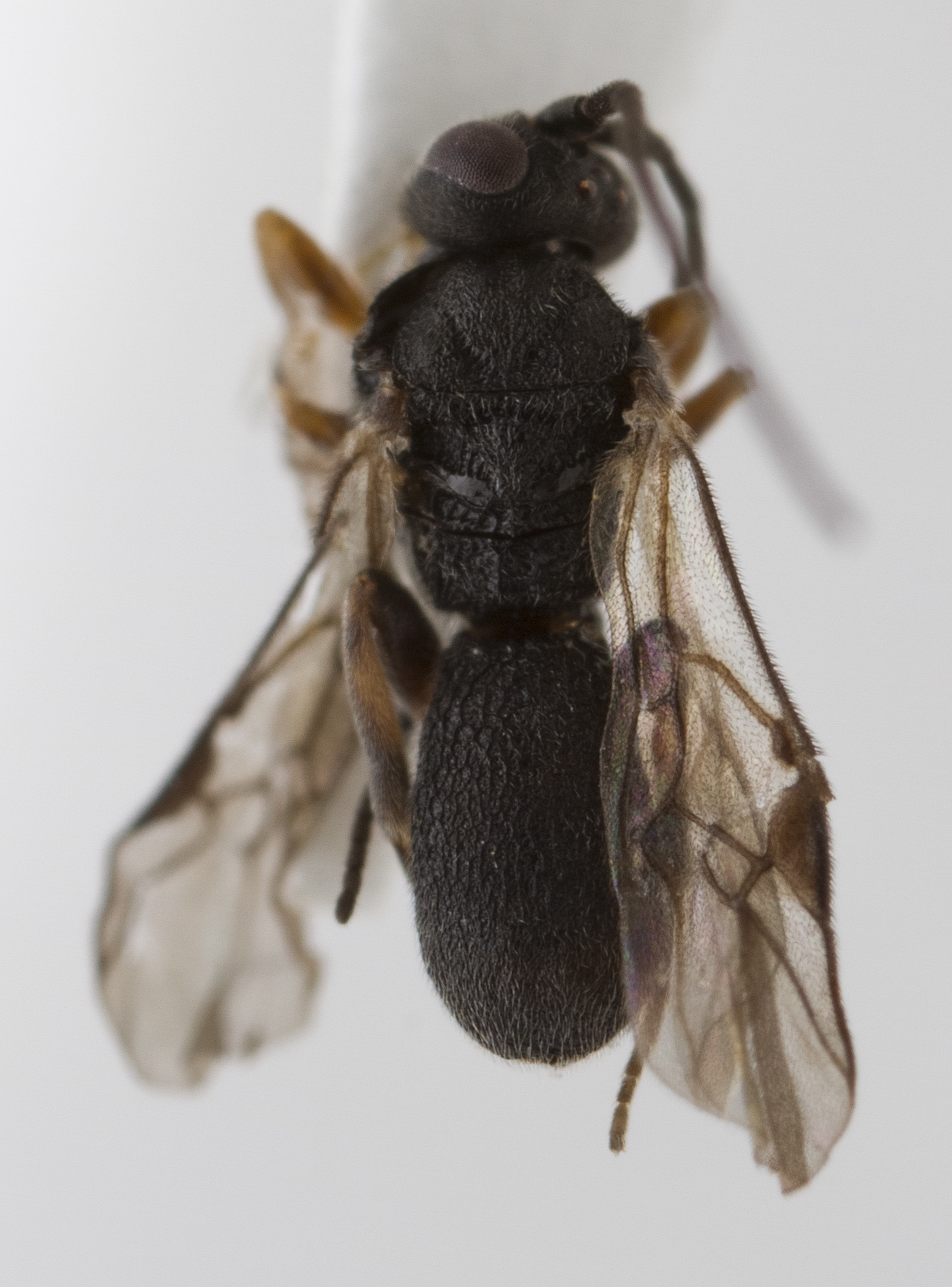
- Chelonus sp.

Scientific classification
- Domain: Eukaryota
- Kingdom: Animalia
- Phylum: Arthropoda
- Class: Insecta
- Order: Hymenoptera
- Family: Braconidae
- Subfamily: Cheloninae
- Genus: Chelonus; Panzer, 1806

Species
- See text

= Chelonus =

Genus of wasps

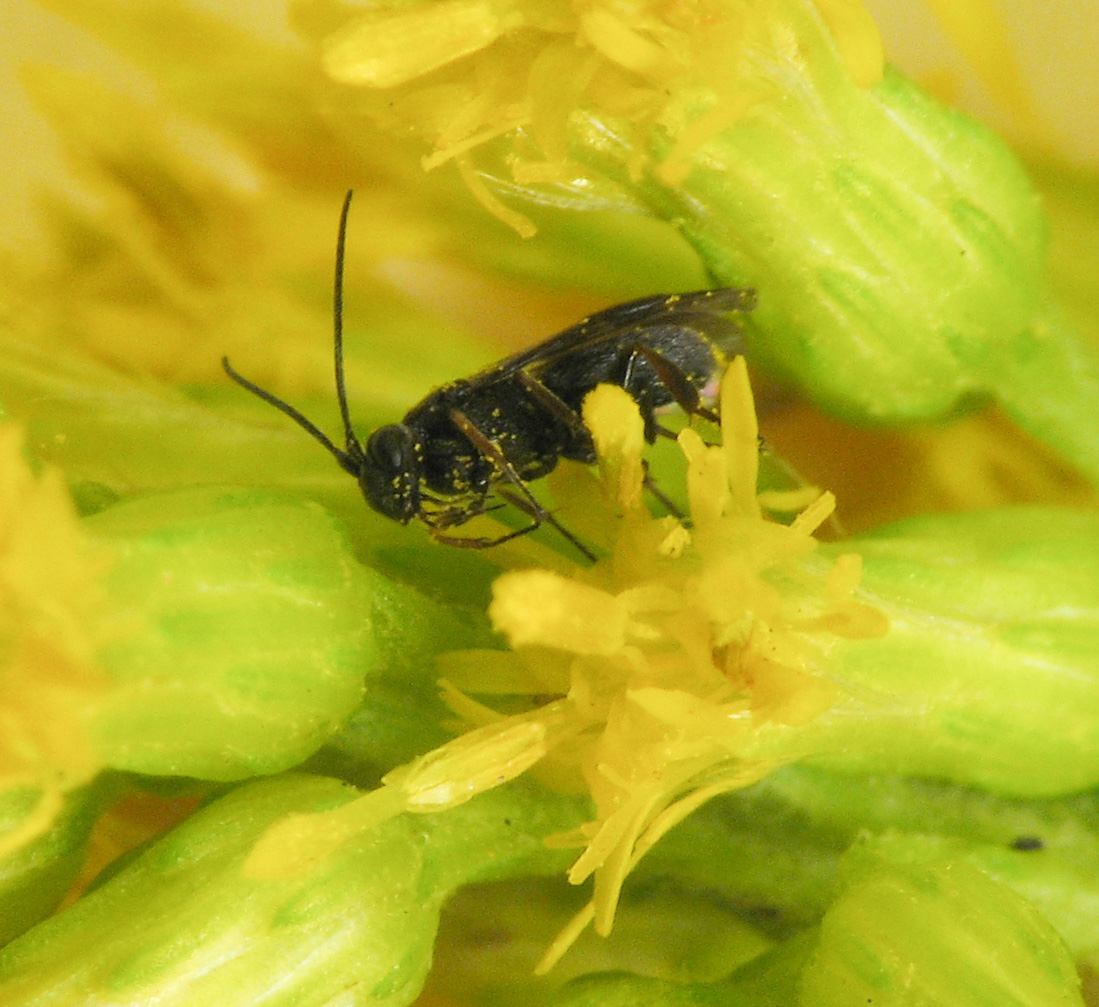
Chelonus sp. on goldenrod

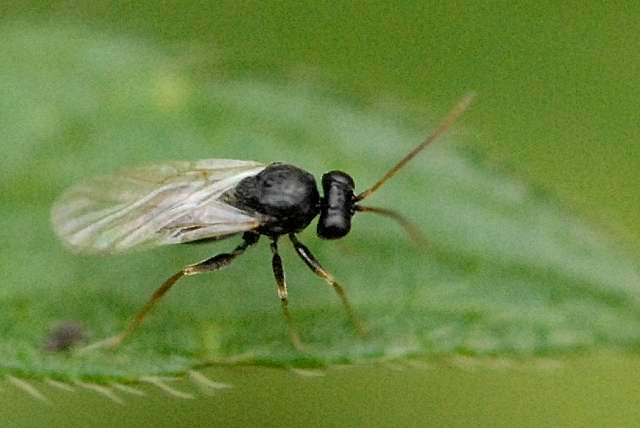
Chelonus basalis

Chelonus is a wasp genus in the subfamily Cheloninae. Their larvae feed chiefly on larvae of moths in superfamilies Tortricoidea and Pyraloidea.

== Species ==
- Chelonus abditus
- Chelonus abductor
- Chelonus aberrans
- Chelonus abnormalis
- Chelonus absonus
- Chelonus abstrusus
- Chelonus aciculatus
- Chelonus aculeatus
- Chelonus acuminatus
- Chelonus acutigaster
- Chelonus acutiusculus
- Chelonus acutulus
- Chelonus adjunctus
- Chelonus aelleniae
- Chelonus agathis
- Chelonus agilis
- Chelonus ahngeri
- Chelonus akmolensis
- Chelonus alaicus
- Chelonus albicinctus
- Chelonus albofasciatus
- Chelonus albomacula
- Chelonus albor
- Chelonus alexeevi
- Chelonus algiricus
- Chelonus aligarhensis
- Chelonus alius
- Chelonus alpinus
- Chelonus alter
- Chelonus alternator
- Chelonus alticinctus
- Chelonus altilis
- Chelonus altimontanus
- Chelonus altitudinis
- Chelonus alveatus
- Chelonus amaculatus
- Chelonus amandus
- Chelonus amurensis
- Chelonus andrievskii
- Chelonus angustatus
- Chelonus angustiventris
- Chelonus angustulus
- Chelonus angustus
- Chelonus anivicus
- Chelonus annularius
- Chelonus annulatus
- Chelonus annulicornis
- Chelonus annuliflagellaris
- Chelonus annulipes
- Chelonus antennalis
- Chelonus antenventris
- Chelonus anthracinus
- Chelonus antillarum
- Chelonus antropovi
- Chelonus anxius
- Chelonus apicalis
- Chelonus apistae
- Chelonus arcuatilis
- Chelonus areolatus
- Chelonus argutus
- Chelonus arisanus
- Chelonus armeniacus
- Chelonus arnoldii
- Chelonus artoventris
- Chelonus artus
- Chelonus ashmeadii
- Chelonus asiaticus
- Chelonus assimilis
- Chelonus atripes
- Chelonus audeoudiae
- Chelonus aughei
- Chelonus auricornis
- Chelonus australiensis
- Chelonus australis
- Chelonus azerbajdzhanicus
- Chelonus badachshanicus
- Chelonus balchanicus
- Chelonus balkanicus
- Chelonus balkhashensis
- Chelonus basalis
- Chelonus basicinctus
- Chelonus basifemoralis
- Chelonus basilaris
- Chelonus basimacula
- Chelonus basimaculatus
- Chelonus baskunchakensis
- Chelonus batrachedrae
- Chelonus bedfordi
- Chelonus belokobylskiji
- Chelonus beyarslani
- Chelonus bickleyi
- Chelonus bicoloricornis
- Chelonus bicoloripes
- Chelonus bicolorus
- Chelonus bidens
- Chelonus bidentatus
- Chelonus bidentulus
- Chelonus bifidus
- Chelonus bifoveolatus
- Chelonus bifurcatus
- Chelonus bigener
- Chelonus bigus
- Chelonus biliosus
- Chelonus bimaculatus
- Chelonus binus
- Chelonus bipicturatus
- Chelonus bispinus
- Chelonus bituberculatus
- Chelonus bituminalis
- Chelonus bitumineus
- Chelonus blackburni
- Chelonus bolsoni
- Chelonus bonellii
- Chelonus bosonohyi
- Chelonus brachyurus
- Chelonus brasiliensis
- Chelonus brevicella
- Chelonus brevicornis
- Chelonus brevifemoralis
- Chelonus brevifemur
- Chelonus brevigenis
- Chelonus brevimalarspacemis
- Chelonus brevimetacarpus
- Chelonus brevioculatus
- Chelonus breviradialis
- Chelonus breviradis
- Chelonus brevis
- Chelonus breviventris
- Chelonus brunniventris
- Chelonus bucculentus
- Chelonus budapesti
- Chelonus budrysi
- Chelonus burjaticus
- Chelonus burksi
- Chelonus buscki
- Chelonus busckiella
- Chelonus bussyi
- Chelonus caboverdensis
- Chelonus calcaratus
- Chelonus calligoni
- Chelonus canescens
- Chelonus capensis
- Chelonus capsa
- Chelonus capsularis
- Chelonus capsulifer
- Chelonus caradrinae
- Chelonus carbonator
- Chelonus carinatikovi
- Chelonus carinatus
- Chelonus carinigaster
- Chelonus cariniventris
- Chelonus caulicola
- Chelonus cautus
- Chelonus cavifrons
- Chelonus cavipodex
- Chelonus ceanothi
- Chelonus cedropadicus
- Chelonus centralis
- Chelonus cephelanthi
- Chelonus cereris
- Chelonus chailini
- Chelonus chalchingoli
- Chelonus changaicus
- Chelonus changbaishanensis
- Chelonus chasanicus
- Chelonus chilensis
- Chelonus chinensis
- Chelonus chrysobasis
- Chelonus chrysogaster
- Chelonus chrysomacula
- Chelonus chrysostigma
- Chelonus chrysotegula
- Chelonus chrysozona
- Chelonus chryspedes
- Chelonus cinctipes
- Chelonus cingulipes
- Chelonus circulariforameni
- Chelonus circumfissuralis
- Chelonus circumfossa
- Chelonus circumrimosus
- Chelonus circumscriptor
- Chelonus cisapicalis
- Chelonus cisdauricus
- Chelonus clausus
- Chelonus clavinervis
- Chelonus clypealis
- Chelonus cnephasiae
- Chelonus compositus
- Chelonus compressor
- Chelonus concentralis
- Chelonus conformis
- Chelonus confusus
- Chelonus connectens
- Chelonus consociatus
- Chelonus constrictus
- Chelonus continens
- Chelonus contractellus
- Chelonus contractus
- Chelonus contrarius
- Chelonus convexus
- Chelonus coriaceus
- Chelonus cornutus
- Chelonus corvulus
- Chelonus cosmopteridis
- Chelonus crassitarsis
- Chelonus crassus
- Chelonus cratospilumi
- Chelonus creteus
- Chelonus curtigenis
- Chelonus curtimetacarpus
- Chelonus curtus
- Chelonus curvimaculatus
- Chelonus curvinervius
- Chelonus curvipes
- Chelonus cushmani
- Chelonus cycloporus
- Chelonus cylindricus
- Chelonus cylindrus
- Chelonus cyprensis
- Chelonus cypri
- Chelonus cyprianus
- Chelonus daanyuanensis
- Chelonus dauricus
- Chelonus decaryi
- Chelonus declivis
- Chelonus decorus
- Chelonus delphinensis
- Chelonus denticulatus
- Chelonus deogiri
- Chelonus depressus
- Chelonus devexus
- Chelonus devius
- Chelonus diaphor
- Chelonus discolorius
- Chelonus disjunctus
- Chelonus disparilis
- Chelonus dolicocephalus
- Chelonus dolosus
- Chelonus dreisbachi
- Chelonus dwibindus
- Chelonus eaous
- Chelonus egregicolor
- Chelonus elachistae
- Chelonus elaeaphilus
- Chelonus elasmopalpi
- Chelonus electus
- Chelonus elegans
- Chelonus elegantulus
- Chelonus elenae
- Chelonus elongates
- Chelonus elongatulus
- Chelonus elongatus
- Chelonus emeljanovi
- Chelonus empherus
- Chelonus endomius
- Chelonus ensifer
- Chelonus equalis
- Chelonus erdosi
- Chelonus ergeniensis
- Chelonus ermolenkoi
- Chelonus erosus
- Chelonus errabundus
- Chelonus erraticus
- Chelonus erratus
- Chelonus erroneus
- Chelonus erythrogaster
- Chelonus erythropodus
- Chelonus erythropus
- Chelonus erythrosoma
- Chelonus eucosmae
- Chelonus eugenii
- Chelonus euphorbiae
- Chelonus eurous
- Chelonus euryspilus
- Chelonus excisus
- Chelonus exilis
- Chelonus eximius
- Chelonus falkovitshi
- Chelonus fatigatus
- Chelonus fenestratus
- Chelonus ferganicus
- Chelonus ferulae
- Chelonus fischeri
- Chelonus fisetshkoi
- Chelonus fissilis
- Chelonus fissus
- Chelonus fistulatus
- Chelonus flagellaris
- Chelonus flavens
- Chelonus flavicoxis
- Chelonus flavipalpis
- Chelonus flavomarginalis
- Chelonus flavoneavulus
- Chelonus flavoscaposus
- Chelonus foersteri
- Chelonus formosanus
- Chelonus formosovi
- Chelonus fornicatus
- Chelonus fortispinus
- Chelonus foveiventris
- Chelonus foveolatus
- Chelonus frater
- Chelonus fraternus
- Chelonus frontalis
- Chelonus fujianensis
- Chelonus fulgidus
- Chelonus fumarius
- Chelonus fumidus
- Chelonus fumipennis
- Chelonus fuscipennis
- Chelonus gastrus
- Chelonus gauldi
- Chelonus gayi
- Chelonus genalis
- Chelonus glabrifrons
- Chelonus gladiclypis
- Chelonus gladius
- Chelonus gohoi
- Chelonus gossypicola
- Chelonus gossypii
- Chelonus gozmanyi
- Chelonus graciflagellum
- Chelonus gracilariae
- Chelonus gracilis
- Chelonus gracitis
- Chelonus grandipunctatus
- Chelonus grapholithae
- Chelonus gratus
- Chelonus gravenhorstii
- Chelonus gryoexcavatus
- Chelonus guadunensis
- Chelonus guamensis
- Chelonus gussakovskii
- Chelonus hadrogaster
- Chelonus heliopae
- Chelonus helleni
- Chelonus hemiagathis
- Chelonus heraticus
- Chelonus herbigradus
- Chelonus hiemalis
- Chelonus hirmaculatus
- Chelonus hispanicus
- Chelonus hofferi
- Chelonus holisi
- Chelonus hoppingi
- Chelonus hubeiensis
- Chelonus humilis
- Chelonus hurdi
- Chelonus hurtus
- Chelonus hyalinus
- Chelonus ibericus
- Chelonus icteribasis
- Chelonus immaculatus
- Chelonus impressiventris
- Chelonus improcerus
- Chelonus inanitus
- Chelonus incisus
- Chelonus incrassus
- Chelonus indericus
- Chelonus indicus
- Chelonus insepultus
- Chelonus inserenus
- Chelonus insidiator
- Chelonus insidiatrix
- Chelonus insidiosus
- Chelonus insincerus
- Chelonus insolitus
- Chelonus insuetus
- Chelonus insulanus
- Chelonus insularis
- Chelonus intercessor
- Chelonus interpositus
- Chelonus iranicus
- Chelonus iridescens
- Chelonus irremeabilis
- Chelonus irreprehensus
- Chelonus irrisor
- Chelonus irritator
- Chelonus irritus
- Chelonus irrugator
- Chelonus irruptus
- Chelonus iskenderi
- Chelonus ismayi
- Chelonus isolatus
- Chelonus istriensis
- Chelonus jacobsoni
- Chelonus jaicus
- Chelonus jakuticus
- Chelonus japonicus
- Chelonus jilinensis
- Chelonus johni
- Chelonus jonaitisi
- Chelonus jordanicus
- Chelonus juldashevi
- Chelonus jungi
- Chelonus justus
- Chelonus kalmykorum
- Chelonus karadagensis
- Chelonus karadagi
- Chelonus karakalensis
- Chelonus karakumicus
- Chelonus kasachstanicus
- Chelonus kaszabi
- Chelonus kazakhstanicus
- Chelonus kazenasi
- Chelonus keiferiae
- Chelonus kellieae
- Chelonus kermakiae
- Chelonus kerzhneri
- Chelonus keteper
- Chelonus kiritshenkoi
- Chelonus kirvus
- Chelonus klugei
- Chelonus knabi
- Chelonus konkaputus
- Chelonus kopetdagicus
- Chelonus koponeni
- Chelonus koreanus
- Chelonus kostylevi
- Chelonus kotenkoi
- Chelonus kozlovi
- Chelonus krivokhatskyi
- Chelonus krombeini
- Chelonus kryzhanovskii
- Chelonus kughitangi
- Chelonus kyrgisorum
- Chelonus labipalpis
- Chelonus lacteipennis
- Chelonus laevifrons
- Chelonus lamellosus
- Chelonus laplandicus
- Chelonus latens
- Chelonus laticeps
- Chelonus laticinctus
- Chelonus latifossa
- Chelonus latifunis
- Chelonus latitemporis
- Chelonus latrunculus
- Chelonus lavernae
- Chelonus leleji
- Chelonus leptogaster
- Chelonus leucomaculus
- Chelonus liber
- Chelonus lissocephalus
- Chelonus lissofossa
- Chelonus lissogaster
- Chelonus lissoscutellaris
- Chelonus lissosoma
- Chelonus lodosus
- Chelonus longidiastemus
- Chelonus longihair
- Chelonus longioculis
- Chelonus longipalpis
- Chelonus longipedicellus
- Chelonus longipes
- Chelonus longirimosus
- Chelonus longistriatus
- Chelonus longitarsumis
- Chelonus longiusculus
- Chelonus longiventris
- Chelonus longqiensis
- Chelonus longulus
- Chelonus lugubris
- Chelonus lukasi
- Chelonus lunari
- Chelonus lunaris
- Chelonus lunatus
- Chelonus lunulatus
- Chelonus luteipalpis
- Chelonus lutoga
- Chelonus luzhetzkji
- Chelonus luzonicus
- Chelonus macrellips
- Chelonus macrocorpus
- Chelonus macros
- Chelonus maculibasis
- Chelonus magadani
- Chelonus magnifissuralis
- Chelonus magnipunctus
- Chelonus majusdentatus
- Chelonus makarkini
- Chelonus malayanus
- Chelonus malinellae
- Chelonus marshakovi
- Chelonus marshi
- Chelonus masoni
- Chelonus maudae
- Chelonus mccombi
- Chelonus medicaginis
- Chelonus medinus
- Chelonus mediterraneus
- Chelonus medus
- Chelonus megacephalus
- Chelonus megaspilus
- Chelonus mellipes
- Chelonus meridionalis
- Chelonus mesotellus
- Chelonus metatarsalis
- Chelonus mexicanus
- Chelonus microcella
- Chelonus microchelonoides
- Chelonus microfamosus
- Chelonus microphtalmus
- Chelonus microsomus
- Chelonus mikhaili
- Chelonus milkoi
- Chelonus minifissus
- Chelonus minifossa
- Chelonus minimus
- Chelonus minutissimus
- Chelonus minutus
- Chelonus minytellus
- Chelonus mirabilis
- Chelonus mirandus
- Chelonus mirumis
- Chelonus miscellae
- Chelonus mishi
- Chelonus missai
- Chelonus mitigatus
- Chelonus modestus
- Chelonus moldavicus
- Chelonus mongolicus
- Chelonus montanus
- Chelonus monticola
- Chelonus moravicus
- Chelonus moriokensis
- Chelonus moskovitus
- Chelonus mucronatus
- Chelonus muesebecki
- Chelonus multirimosus
- Chelonus multistriatus
- Chelonus munakatae
- Chelonus muratus
- Chelonus mushanus
- Chelonus myartsevae
- Chelonus mysticorum
- Chelonus nachitshevanicus
- Chelonus naethrus
- Chelonus nanus
- Chelonus narayani
- Chelonus narendrani
- Chelonus nartshukae
- Chelonus narynicus
- Chelonus nebraskensis
- Chelonus nigellus
- Chelonus niger
- Chelonus nigricans
- Chelonus nigricornis
- Chelonus nigricoxatus
- Chelonus nigrimembris
- Chelonus nigrinervis
- Chelonus nigrinus
- Chelonus nigripalpis
- Chelonus nigripennis
- Chelonus nigripes
- Chelonus nigritibialis
- Chelonus nigritulus
- Chelonus nigritus
- Chelonus nikolskajae
- Chelonus nomas
- Chelonus notaulii
- Chelonus noyesi
- Chelonus obliquis
- Chelonus obscuratus
- Chelonus obturbatus
- Chelonus ocellatus
- Chelonus oculator
- Chelonus olgacola
- Chelonus olgae
- Chelonus ononicus
- Chelonus opaculus
- Chelonus opacus
- Chelonus orchis
- Chelonus orenburgensis
- Chelonus orientalis
- Chelonus orotukanensis
- Chelonus ovalis
- Chelonus oviventris
- Chelonus pachytellus
- Chelonus pallidus
- Chelonus pallipeser
- Chelonus palpalis
- Chelonus palpator
- Chelonus pannonicus
- Chelonus pappi
- Chelonus papua
- Chelonus paradoxus
- Chelonus paralunaris
- Chelonus parverticalis
- Chelonus parvus
- Chelonus paucifossa
- Chelonus paululus
- Chelonus pecki
- Chelonus pectinophorae
- Chelonus pectoralis
- Chelonus pedator
- Chelonus pellucens
- Chelonus periplocae
- Chelonus pertristis
- Chelonus pertusus
- Chelonus peruensis
- Chelonus pesenkoi
- Chelonus petilusi
- Chelonus petrovae
- Chelonus phalloniae
- Chelonus phaloniae
- Chelonus phthorimaeae
- Chelonus pictipes
- Chelonus pictus
- Chelonus pikeni
- Chelonus pilicornis
- Chelonus pilosulus
- Chelonus pini
- Chelonus plainifacis
- Chelonus planiventris
- Chelonus plenus
- Chelonus plesius
- Chelonus podlussanyi
- Chelonus polycolor
- Chelonus ponapensis
- Chelonus ponderosae
- Chelonus popovi
- Chelonus porteri
- Chelonus posjeticus
- Chelonus praepusillus
- Chelonus probabilis
- Chelonus procericornis
- Chelonus processiventris
- Chelonus productus
- Chelonus prolatricornis
- Chelonus propodealis
- Chelonus propodealoides
- Chelonus proteus
- Chelonus prunicola
- Chelonus przewalskii
- Chelonus pseudasiaticus
- Chelonus pseudobasalis
- Chelonus pseudoscrobiculatus
- Chelonus puerilis
- Chelonus punctatus
- Chelonus punctifossa
- Chelonus punctipennis
- Chelonus punctiscutellaris
- Chelonus pusilloides
- Chelonus pusillus
- Chelonus pusio
- Chelonus pygmaeus
- Chelonus quadriceps
- Chelonus quadrimaculatus
- Chelonus radialis
- Chelonus raoi
- Chelonus rectangularis
- Chelonus recurvariae
- Chelonus repeteki
- Chelonus retrorsus
- Chelonus retroversus
- Chelonus retrusus
- Chelonus retusus
- Chelonus rhagius
- Chelonus rimosus
- Chelonus ripaeus
- Chelonus riphaeicus
- Chelonus risorius
- Chelonus ritchiei
- Chelonus robertianus
- Chelonus rogezensis
- Chelonus rohdendorfi
- Chelonus rokkina
- Chelonus rostratus
- Chelonus rostrornis
- Chelonus rotundifossa
- Chelonus rubens
- Chelonus rubicunndis
- Chelonus rubiginis
- Chelonus rubriventris
- Chelonus rudolfae
- Chelonus ruficollis
- Chelonus ruficornis
- Chelonus rufifossa
- Chelonus rufinatumer
- Chelonus rufipedator
- Chelonus rufipes
- Chelonus rufiscapus
- Chelonus rufisignatus
- Chelonus rufiventris
- Chelonus ruflavus
- Chelonus rufoscapus
- Chelonus rufus
- Chelonus rugicollis
- Chelonus rugilobus
- Chelonus rugosinotum
- Chelonus rugosivertex
- Chelonus rugulosus
- Chelonus ruptor
- Chelonus rutshuricus
- Chelonus sagaensis
- Chelonus sagittatus
- Chelonus saileri
- Chelonus saipanensis
- Chelonus saksauli
- Chelonus salebrosus
- Chelonus salicis
- Chelonus salomonis
- Chelonus sassacus
- Chelonus scaberrimus
- Chelonus scabrator
- Chelonus scabrosus
- Chelonus schizogaster
- Chelonus scrobiculatus
- Chelonus sculleni
- Chelonus sculptur
- Chelonus sculptureatumus
- Chelonus scutellatus
- Chelonus secundus
- Chelonus semenovi
- Chelonus semihyalinus
- Chelonus semilissus
- Chelonus semilunaris
- Chelonus septemdecimplex
- Chelonus sericeus
- Chelonus setaceus
- Chelonus seticornis
- Chelonus severini
- Chelonus seyrigi
- Chelonus shafeei
- Chelonus shenefelti
- Chelonus shennongensis
- Chelonus shestakovi
- Chelonus shevyryevi
- Chelonus shoshoneanorum
- Chelonus shyamus
- Chelonus shyrvanicus
- Chelonus signatus
- Chelonus silvestrii
- Chelonus similis
- Chelonus sinensis
- Chelonus sinevi
- Chelonus sinuosus
- Chelonus smirnovi
- Chelonus sobrinus
- Chelonus sochiensis
- Chelonus sochii
- Chelonus sochiorum
- Chelonus socors
- Chelonus solidus
- Chelonus sonorensis
- Chelonus sordipalpis
- Chelonus spasskensis
- Chelonus spiniger
- Chelonus spinosus
- Chelonus starki
- Chelonus stenogaster
- Chelonus sternalis
- Chelonus sternatus
- Chelonus striatiscuta
- Chelonus striatus
- Chelonus subabditus
- Chelonus subabstrusus
- Chelonus subagathis
- Chelonus subamandus
- Chelonus subangustatus
- Chelonus subannulatus
- Chelonus subarcuatilis
- Chelonus subbasalis
- Chelonus subcapsulifer
- Chelonus subcaudatus
- Chelonus subcontractus
- Chelonus subcorvulus
- Chelonus subelaeaphilus
- Chelonus subelegantulus
- Chelonus subfenestratus
- Chelonus subflagellaris
- Chelonus subgenalis
- Chelonus submarginalis
- Chelonus submuticus
- Chelonus subpedator
- Chelonus subplanus
- Chelonus subpusillus
- Chelonus subrimulosus
- Chelonus subseticornis
- Chelonus subsulcatus
- Chelonus subtilistriatus
- Chelonus subtuberculatus
- Chelonus subventosus
- Chelonus subversatilis
- Chelonus subverticalis
- Chelonus sugonjaevi
- Chelonus sulcatus
- Chelonus suturalis
- Chelonus swellinervis
- Chelonus szepligetii
- Chelonus tabonus
- Chelonus tadzhicus
- Chelonus tadzhikistanicus
- Chelonus tagalicus
- Chelonus talitzkii
- Chelonus talyshensis
- Chelonus talyshicus
- Chelonus tanycoleosus
- Chelonus tarbagataicus
- Chelonus tatricus
- Chelonus tauricola
- Chelonus tauricus
- Chelonus tedzhenicus
- Chelonus tegularis
- Chelonus telengai
- Chelonus temporalis
- Chelonus temulentus
- Chelonus tengisi
- Chelonus tenuicornis
- Chelonus teretiventris
- Chelonus tersakkanicus
- Chelonus testaceus
- Chelonus tettensis
- Chelonus texanus
- Chelonus tianchiensis
- Chelonus tingutanus
- Chelonus tjanshanicus
- Chelonus tobiasi
- Chelonus tolii
- Chelonus tongkingensis
- Chelonus topali
- Chelonus tosensis
- Chelonus townsendi
- Chelonus transbaicalicus
- Chelonus transversus
- Chelonus tricoloratus
- Chelonus triquetrus
- Chelonus trukensis
- Chelonus tsagannuri
- Chelonus tshatkalicus
- Chelonus tuberculatus
- Chelonus tuberosus
- Chelonus tunetensis
- Chelonus turgidus
- Chelonus tuvinus
- Chelonus ubsunuricus
- Chelonus uniformis
- Chelonus unimaculatus
- Chelonus uralicus
- Chelonus uzbekistanicus
- Chelonus vaalensis
- Chelonus walkleyae
- Chelonus varus
- Chelonus watti
- Chelonus vaultclypeolus
- Chelonus ventosus
- Chelonus versatilis
- Chelonus verticalis
- Chelonus vescus
- Chelonus wesmaelii
- Chelonus vickae
- Chelonus victoriensis
- Chelonus victorovi
- Chelonus vitalii
- Chelonus vitasi
- Chelonus vitiensis
- Chelonus vitimi
- Chelonus volgensis
- Chelonus volkovitshi
- Chelonus vulcaniellae
- Chelonus vulgaris
- Chelonus xanthofossa
- Chelonus xanthoscaposus
- Chelonus xanthozona
- Chelonus xenia
- Chelonus yasumatsui
- Chelonus zaitzevi
- Chelonus zeravshanicus
- Chelonus zorkuli
- Chelonus zygophylli
