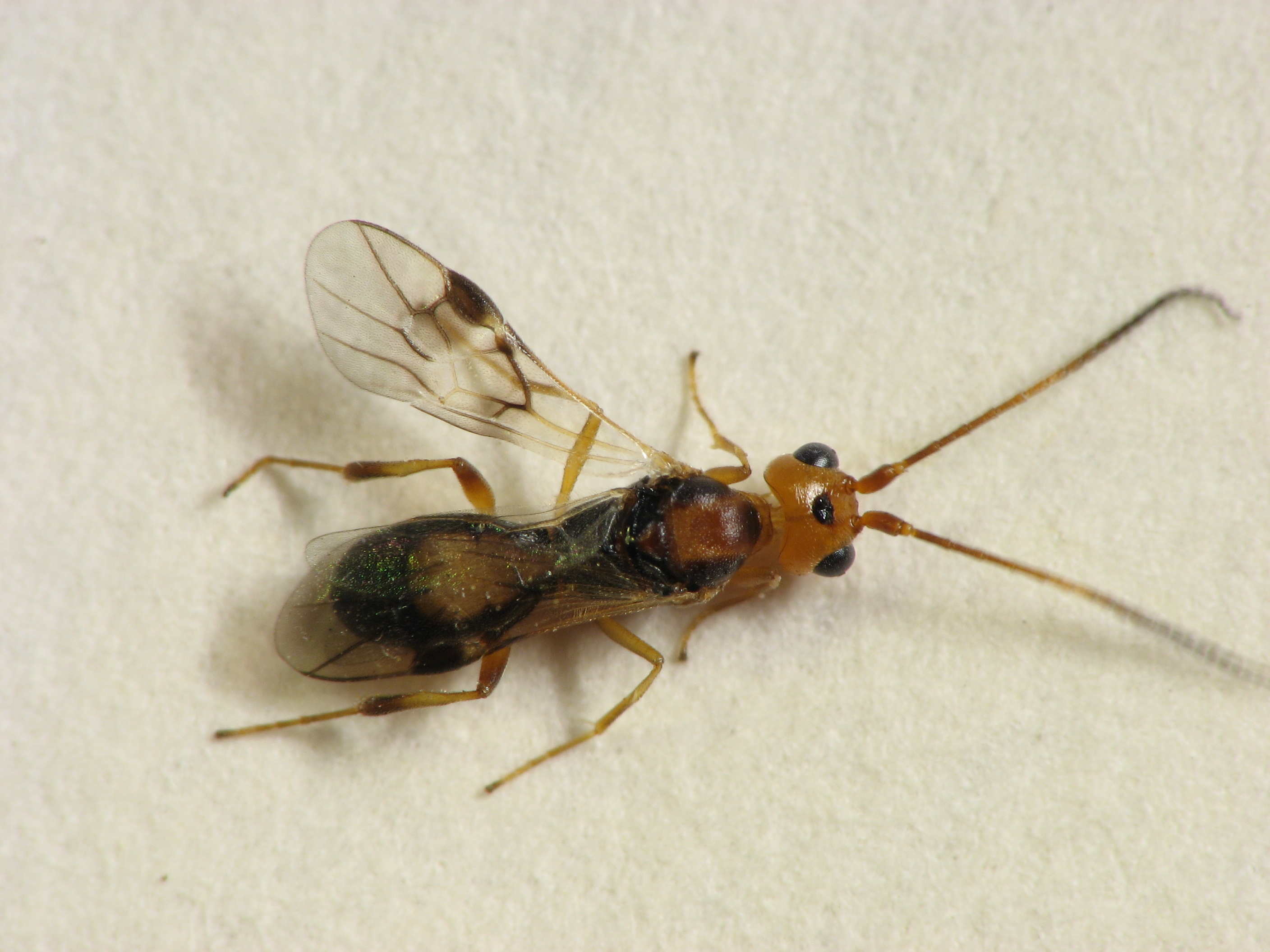

Scientific classification
- Kingdom: Animalia
- Phylum: Arthropoda
- Class: Insecta
- Order: Hymenoptera
- Family: Braconidae
- Subfamily: Cheloninae
- Genus: Phanerotoma; Wesmael, 1838

= Phanerotoma =

Genus of wasps

Phanerotoma is a genus of wasp in the family Braconidae. There are at least 190 described species in Phanerotoma.

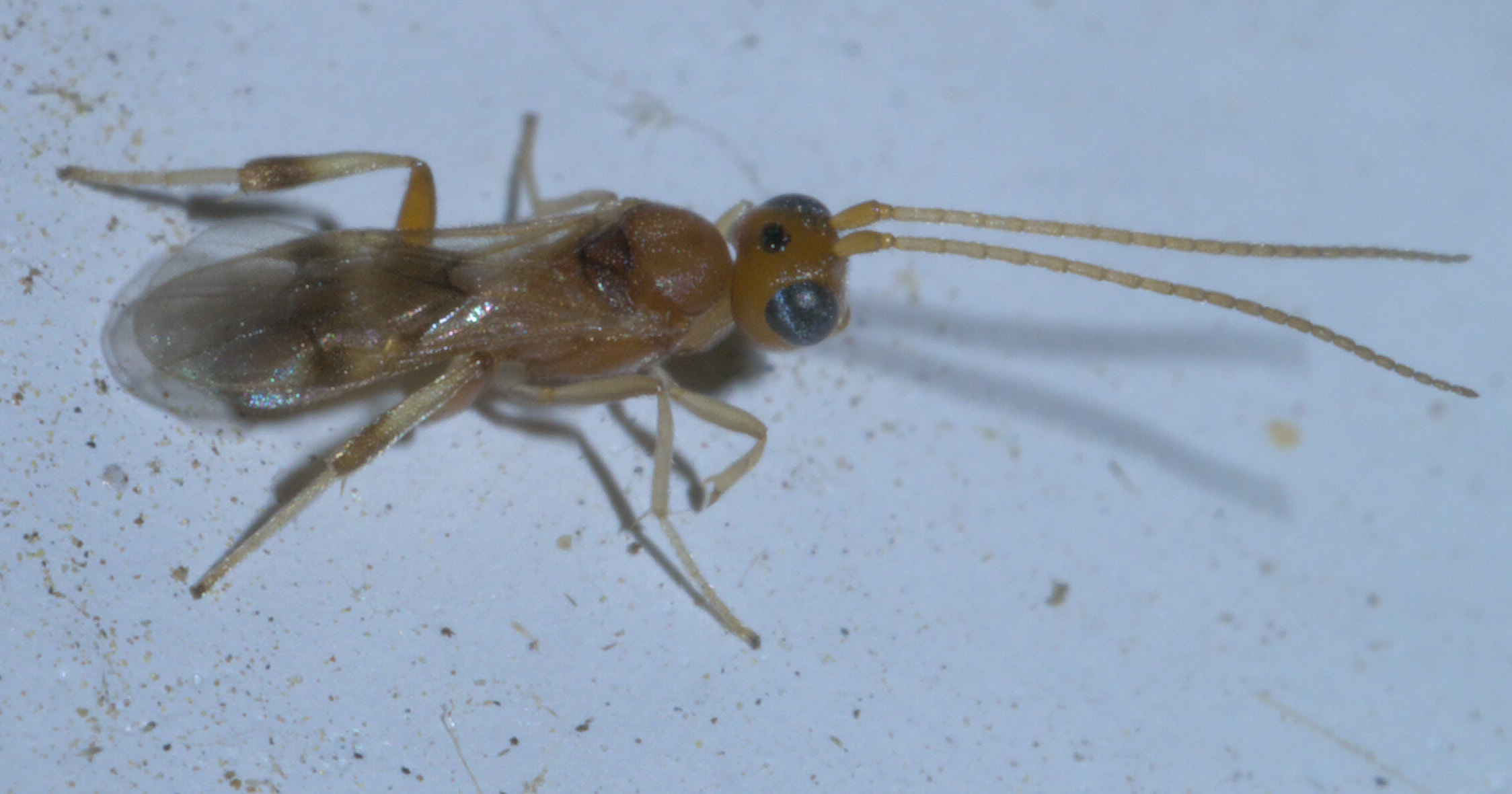

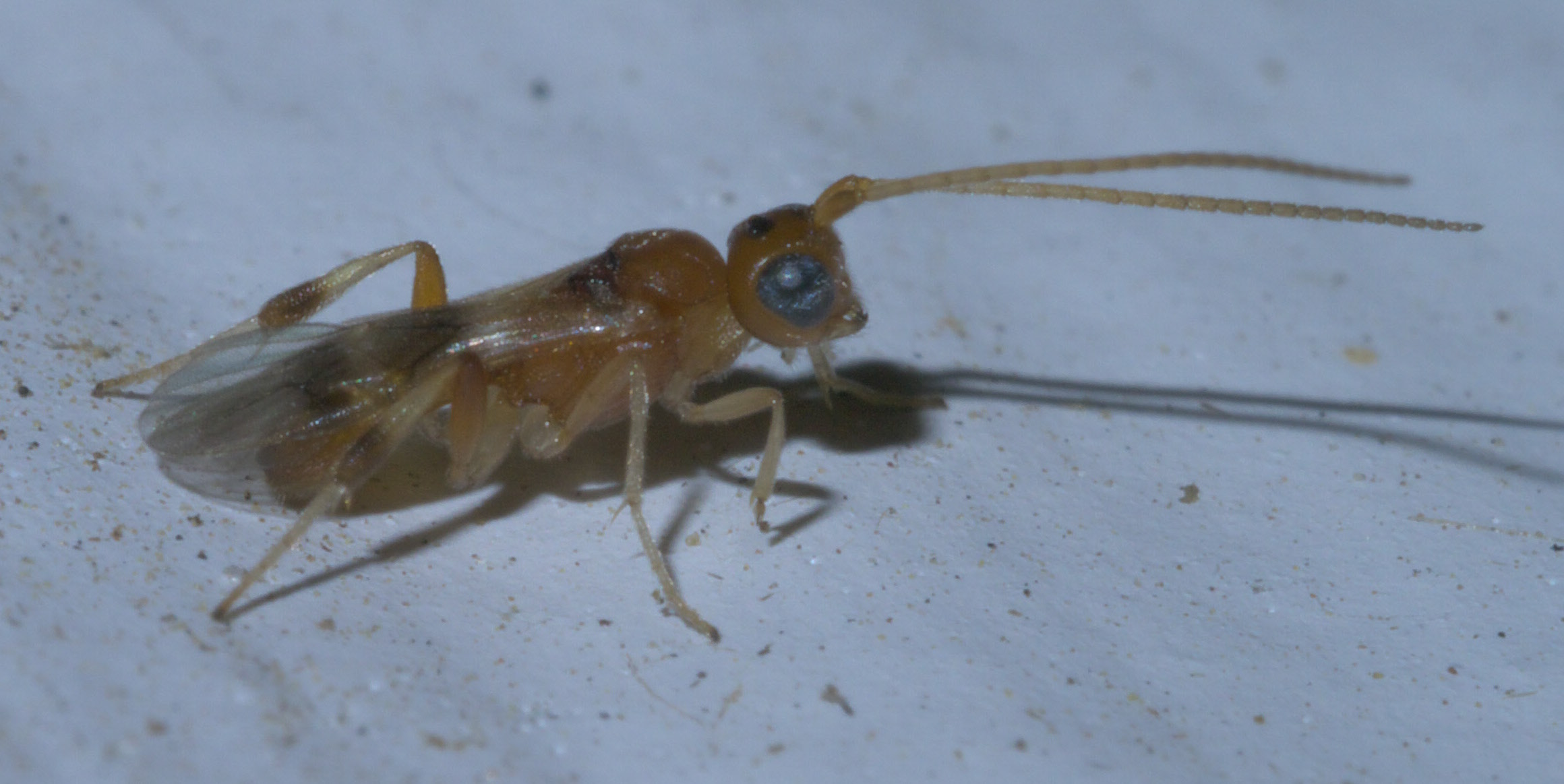

== See also ==
- List of Phanerotoma species
