= Hemocyte (invertebrate immune system cell) =

Cell type that plays a role in the immune system of invertebrates

A hemocyte is a cell that plays a role in the immune system of invertebrates. It is found within the hemolymph. Hemocytes are phagocytes of invertebrates.

Hemocytes in Drosophila melanogaster can be divided into two categories: embryonic and larval. Embryonic hemocytes are derived from head mesoderm and enter the hemolymph as circulating cells. Larval hemocytes, on the other hand, are responsible for tissue remodeling during development. Specifically, they are released during the pupa stage in order to prepare the fly for the transition into an adult and the massive associated tissue reorganization that must occur.

There are four basic types of hemocytes found in fruit flies: secretory, plasmatocytes, crystal cells, and lamellocytes. Secretory cells are never released into the hemolymph and instead send out signalling molecules responsible for cell differentiation. Plasmatocytes are the hemocytes responsible for cell ingestion (phagocytosis) and represent about 95% of circulating hemocytes. Crystal cells are involved in melanization, a process by which microbes/pathogens are engulfed in a hardened gel and destroyed via anti-microbial peptides and other proteins involved in the humoral response. They constitute about 5% of circulating hemocytes. Lamellocytes are flat cells that are never found in adult cells, and instead are only present in larval cells for their ability to encapsulate invading pathogens. They specifically act on parasitic wasp eggs that bind to the surfaces of cells, and are incapable of being phagocytosed by host cells.

In mosquitoes, hemocytes are functionally divided into three populations: granulocytes, oenocytoids and prohemocytes. Granulocytes are the most abundant cell type. They rapidly attach to foreign surfaces and readily engage in phagocytosis. Oenocytoids do not readily spread on foreign surfaces and are the major producers of phenoloxidase, which is the major enzyme of the melanization immune pathway. Prohemocytes are small cells of mostly unknown function, which may result from the asymmetric mitosis of granulocytes. They can differentiate into several cell types.
