= List of Phanerotoma species =

This is a list of 197 species in Phanerotoma, a genus of wasp in the family Braconidae.

== Phanerotoma species ==
- Phanerotoma acara van Achterberg, 1990^{c g}
- Phanerotoma acuminata Szépligeti, 1908^{c g}
- Phanerotoma agarwali Varshney & Shuja-Uddin, 1999^{c g}
- Phanerotoma alagoasensis Zettel, 1992^{c g}
- Phanerotoma analis Zettel, 1990^{c g}
- Phanerotoma andamanensis Gupta^{g}
- Phanerotoma annulata Zettel, 1989^{c g}
- Phanerotoma aperta Szépligeti, 1908^{c g}
- Phanerotoma arakakii Zettel, 1990^{c g}
- Phanerotoma atra Snoflak, 1951^{c g}
- Phanerotoma atriceps Zettel, 1992^{c g}
- Phanerotoma attenuata Zettel, 1989^{c g}
- Phanerotoma australiensis Ashmead, 1900^{c g}
- Phanerotoma aviculus Saussure, 1892^{c g}
- Phanerotoma baltica Brues, 1933^{c g}
- Phanerotoma bannensis Masi, 1944^{c g}
- Phanerotoma behriae Zettel, 1988^{c g}
- Phanerotoma bekilyensis Granger, 1949^{c g}
- Phanerotoma bennetti Muesebeck, 1955^{c g}
- Phanerotoma bicolor Sonan, 1932^{c g}
- Phanerotoma bidentula Zettel, 1992^{c g}
- Phanerotoma bilinea Lyle, 1924^{c g}
- Phanerotoma bouceki van Achterberg, 1990^{c g}
- Phanerotoma brasiliensis Zettel, 1989^{c g}
- Phanerotoma brendelli Zettel, 1990^{c g}
- Phanerotoma brevis Zettel, 1990^{c g}
- Phanerotoma buchneri Fahringer, 1932^{c g}
- Phanerotoma caltagironei Zettel, 1992^{c g}
- Phanerotoma capeki van Achterberg, 1990^{c g}
- Phanerotoma caudalis Zettel, 1989^{c g}
- Phanerotoma caudata Granger, 1949^{c g}
- Phanerotoma circumscripta Zettel, 1989^{c g}
- Phanerotoma coccinellae Girault, 1924^{c g}
- Phanerotoma conopomorphae Tsang & You^{g}
- Phanerotoma crabbi Zettel, 1990^{c g}
- Phanerotoma crocea (Cameron, 1887)^{c g}
- Phanerotoma curvicarinata Cameron, 1911^{c g}
- Phanerotoma curvimaculata Cameron, 1911^{c g}
- Phanerotoma curvinervis Tobias, 2000^{c g}
- Phanerotoma cyrenaica Masi, 1932^{c g}
- Phanerotoma decorata Szepligeti, 1914^{c g}
- Phanerotoma decticauda Zettel, 1988^{c g}
- Phanerotoma dentata (Panzer, 1805)^{c g}
- Phanerotoma divergens van Achterberg, 2009^{c g}
- Phanerotoma diversa (Walker, 1874)^{c g}
- Phanerotoma ebneri Fahringer, 1924^{c g}
- Phanerotoma ejuncida Chen & Ji, 2003^{c g}
- Phanerotoma erythrocephala Rohwer, 1917^{c g}
- Phanerotoma exigua Zettel, 1991^{c g}
- Phanerotoma extensa Brues, 1933^{c g}
- Phanerotoma fasciata Provancher, 1881^{c g}
- Phanerotoma fasciatipennis Granger, 1949^{c g}
- Phanerotoma fastigata Zettel, 1989^{c g}
- Phanerotoma filicornis Zettel, 1988^{c g}
- Phanerotoma flava Ashmead, 1906^{c g}
- Phanerotoma flavida Enderlein, 1912^{c g}
- Phanerotoma floridana Zettel, 1992^{c g}
- Phanerotoma formosana Rohwer, 1934^{c g}
- Phanerotoma fracta Kokujev, 1903^{c g}
- Phanerotoma franklini Gahan, 1917^{c g}
- Phanerotoma fusca Zettel, 1992^{c g}
- Phanerotoma fuscovaria Ashmead, 1894^{c g}
- Phanerotoma ghesquierei de Saeger, 1948^{c g}
- Phanerotoma gigantea Zettel, 1990^{c g}
- Phanerotoma gijswijti van Achterberg, 1990^{c g}
- Phanerotoma glabra Telenga, 1941^{c g}
- Phanerotoma gracilipes (Szepligeti, 1914)^{c g}
- Phanerotoma gracilis Tobias, 1970^{c g}
- Phanerotoma gracilisoma van Achterberg, 1990^{c g}
- Phanerotoma graciloides van Achterberg, 1990^{c g}
- Phanerotoma graeca Zettel, 1990^{c g}
- Phanerotoma grapholithae Muesebeck, 1933^{c g}
- Phanerotoma hapaliae de Saeger, 1948^{c g}
- Phanerotoma hayati Ahmad & Shuja-Uddin, 2004^{c g}
- Phanerotoma hendecasisella Cameron, 1905^{c g}
- Phanerotoma hispanica Kokujev, 1899^{c g}
- Phanerotoma honiarana Zettel, 1990^{c g}
- Phanerotoma humeralis Ashmead, 1894^{c g}
- Phanerotoma ichneutiptera (Vachal, 1907)^{c g}
- Phanerotoma improvisa Zettel, 1991^{c g}
- Phanerotoma indica Zettel, 1990^{c g}
- Phanerotoma inopinata Caltagirone, 1965^{c g}
- Phanerotoma intermedia van Achterberg, 1990^{c g}
- Phanerotoma interstitialis Zettel, 1989^{c g}
- Phanerotoma iturica de Saeger, 1942^{c g}
- Phanerotoma kamtshatica Tobias, 2000^{c g}
- Phanerotoma kasachstanica Tobias, 1964^{c g}
- Phanerotoma katkowi Kokujev, 1900^{c g}
- Phanerotoma kobdensis Tobias, 1972^{c g}
- Phanerotoma kotenkoi Tobias, 2000^{c g}
- Phanerotoma kozlovi Shestakov, 1930^{c g}
- Phanerotoma laspeyresia Rohwer, 1915^{c g}
- Phanerotoma leeuwinensis Turner, 1917^{c g}
- Phanerotoma lepida Zettel, 1990^{c g}
- Phanerotoma leucobasis Kriechbaumer, 1894^{c g}
- Phanerotoma lissonota Tobias, 1972^{c g}
- Phanerotoma longicauda Walley, 1951^{c g}
- Phanerotoma longiradialis van Achterberg, 1990^{c g}
- Phanerotoma longiterebra Zettel, 1990^{c g}
- Phanerotoma maculata (Wollaston, 1858)^{c g}
- Phanerotoma marshalli (Buysson, 1897)^{c g}
- Phanerotoma masiana Fahringer, 1934^{c g}
- Phanerotoma melanocephala Fullaway, 1913^{c g}
- Phanerotoma melanura Zettel, 1988^{c g}
- Phanerotoma mellina Zettel, 1988^{c g}
- Phanerotoma meridionalis Ashmead, 1894^{c g}
- Phanerotoma minuta Kokujev, 1903^{c g}
- Phanerotoma mirabilis Zettel, 1990^{c g}
- Phanerotoma modesta Masi, 1944^{c g}
- Phanerotoma moniliata Ji & Chen, 2003^{c g}
- Phanerotoma moravica Snoflak, 1951^{c g}
- Phanerotoma myeloisae Fullaway, 1956^{c g}
- Phanerotoma nathani Zettel, 1990^{c g}
- Phanerotoma nepalensis Zettel, 1989^{c g}
- Phanerotoma nigricephala Zettel, 1990^{c g}
- Phanerotoma nigriceps Szepligeti, 1914^{c g}
- Phanerotoma nigripelta Muesebeck, 1955^{c g}
- Phanerotoma nigroscutis Cameron, 1905^{c g}
- Phanerotoma nigrotibialis Zettel, 1989^{c g}
- Phanerotoma nitidiventris Zettel, 1990^{c g}
- Phanerotoma nocturna Tobias, 1967^{c g}
- Phanerotoma notabilis Zettel, 1992^{c g}
- Phanerotoma novacaledoniensis Zettel, 1990^{c g}
- Phanerotoma novaehebridensis Zettel, 1990^{c g}
- Phanerotoma novaguineensis Szepligeti, 1900^{c g}
- Phanerotoma novateutoniana Zettel, 1990^{c g}
- Phanerotoma noyesi Zettel, 1990^{c g}
- Phanerotoma obscura Snoflak, 1951^{c g}
- Phanerotoma offensa Papp, 1989^{c g}
- Phanerotoma orientalis Szepligeti, 1902^{c g}
- Phanerotoma ornatula Brues, 1926^{c g}
- Phanerotoma pacifica Zettel, 1990^{c g}
- Phanerotoma pallida Cameron, 1911^{c g}
- Phanerotoma pallidipes Cameron, 1911^{c g}
- Phanerotoma pallidula Masi, 1945^{c g}
- Phanerotoma panamana Zettel, 1990^{c g}
- Phanerotoma pappi Zettel, 1990^{c g}
- Phanerotoma parastigmalis Tobias, 2000^{c g}
- Phanerotoma parva Kokujev, 1903^{c g}
- Phanerotoma pedra Papp, 1989^{c g}
- Phanerotoma pellucida Zettel, 1990^{c g}
- Phanerotoma permixtellae Fischer, 1968^{c g}
- Phanerotoma persa Shestakov, 1930^{c g}
- Phanerotoma phycitinoma de Saeger, 1942^{c g}
- Phanerotoma planifrons (Nees, 1816)^{c g}
- Phanerotoma plaumanni Zettel, 1989^{c g}
- Phanerotoma popovi Telenga, 1941^{c g}
- Phanerotoma potanini Kokujev, 1895^{c g}
- Phanerotoma producta Watanabe, 1937^{c g}
- Phanerotoma puchneriana Zettel, 1992^{c g}
- Phanerotoma pygmaea Szepligeti, 1913^{c g}
- Phanerotoma pyrodercis Fischer, 1962^{c g}
- Phanerotoma recurvariae Cushman, 1914^{c g}
- Phanerotoma rhyacioniae Cushman, 1927^{c g}
- Phanerotoma robusta Zettel, 1988^{c g}
- Phanerotoma rufescens (Latreille, 1809)^{c g}
- Phanerotoma ruficornis Granger, 1949^{c g}
- Phanerotoma rufotestacea Zettel, 1992^{c g}
- Phanerotoma samoana Fullaway, 1940^{c g}
- Phanerotoma sardiana Zettel, 1990^{c g}
- Phanerotoma saussurei Kohl, 1906^{c g}
- Phanerotoma sculptifrons Tobias, 1970^{c g}
- Phanerotoma semenowi Kokujev, 1900^{c g}
- Phanerotoma somaliae Masi, 1943^{c g}
- Phanerotoma somalica Paoli, 1934^{c g}
- Phanerotoma soror van Achterberg, 1990^{c g}
- Phanerotoma spilaspis Cameron, 1911^{c g}
- Phanerotoma sponsa Ji & Chen, 2002^{c g}
- Phanerotoma straminea Viereck, 1913^{c g}
- Phanerotoma subexigua Zettel, 1991^{c g}
- Phanerotoma subpygmaea Granger, 1949^{c g}
- Phanerotoma sulcus Chen & Ji, 2003^{c g}
- Phanerotoma syedi Ahmad & Shuja-Uddin, 2004^{c g}
- Phanerotoma syleptae Zettel, 1990^{c g}
- Phanerotoma terebralis Zettel, 1989^{c g}
- Phanerotoma texana Zettel, 1992^{c g}
- Phanerotoma tibialis (Haldeman, 1849)^{c g}
- Phanerotoma toreutae Caltagirone, 1967^{c g}
- Phanerotoma transcaspica Kokujev, 1902^{c g}
- Phanerotoma tricolorata Zettel, 1988^{c g}
- Phanerotoma tridentati Ji & Chen, 2003^{c g}
- Phanerotoma tritoma (Marshall, 1898)^{c g}
- Phanerotoma trivittata Brues, 1912^{c g}
- Phanerotoma trivittatoides Zettel, 1989^{c g}
- Phanerotoma tropicana Zettel, 1989^{c g}
- Phanerotoma uniformis Brues, 1926^{c g}
- Phanerotoma unipunctata Cushman, 1922^{c g}
- Phanerotoma upoluensis Zettel, 1990^{c g}
- Phanerotoma valentina Moreno & Jimenez, 1992^{c g}
- Phanerotoma vana de Saeger, 1948^{c g}
- Phanerotoma variegata Szepligeti, 1914^{c g}
- Phanerotoma vidua De Santis, 1975^{c g}
- Phanerotoma wahlbergianae Fischer, 1963^{c g}
- Phanerotoma waitzbaueri Zettel, 1987^{c g}
- Phanerotoma zebripes Chen & Ji, 2003^{c g}
- Phanerotoma zelleriae Zettel, 1992^{c g}
- Phanerotoma zinovjevi Tobias, 2000^{c g}

This is a list of 197 species in Phanerotoma, a genus of wasp in the family Braconidae. Data sources: i = ITIS, c = Catalogue of Life, g = GBIF, b = Bugguide.net
