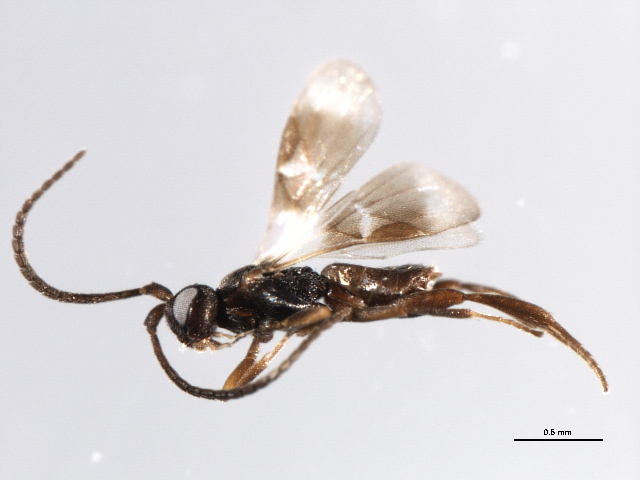
- Paradelius sp. from Manitoba, Canada

Scientific classification
- Domain: Eukaryota
- Kingdom: Animalia
- Phylum: Arthropoda
- Class: Insecta
- Order: Hymenoptera
- Family: Braconidae
- Subfamily: Cheloninae
- Tribe: Adeliini; Viereck, 1918

Genera
- Adelius; Paradelius; Sculptomyiola; Sinadelius

= Adeliini (wasp) =

Tribe of wasps

Adeliini is a tribe of braconid wasps within the subfamily Cheloninae. Until 2016, Adeliini was classified as a separate subfamily, the Adeliinae. They are small, stout-bodied braconids that parasitize the larvae of leaf-mining moths. Despite being widespread, they tend to be rare in entomological collections.

== Description and distribution ==
Like all Chelonines, the first two (sometimes the first three or four) metasomal terga are fused, and terga six and seven lack spiracles. Features which define the Adeliini as a distinct tribe include apically reduced wing venation and less carapace-like metasomal terga.

Adeliini species are distributed both in the Old and New World.

== Biology ==
Adeliini are koinobiont endoparasitoids of leaf-mining moths in the family Nepticulidae, from which the adults emerge from the host cocoon. Some species appear to mimic ants in behavior, and one species of Paradelius has been recorded emitting a formic acid-like odor when disturbed.
