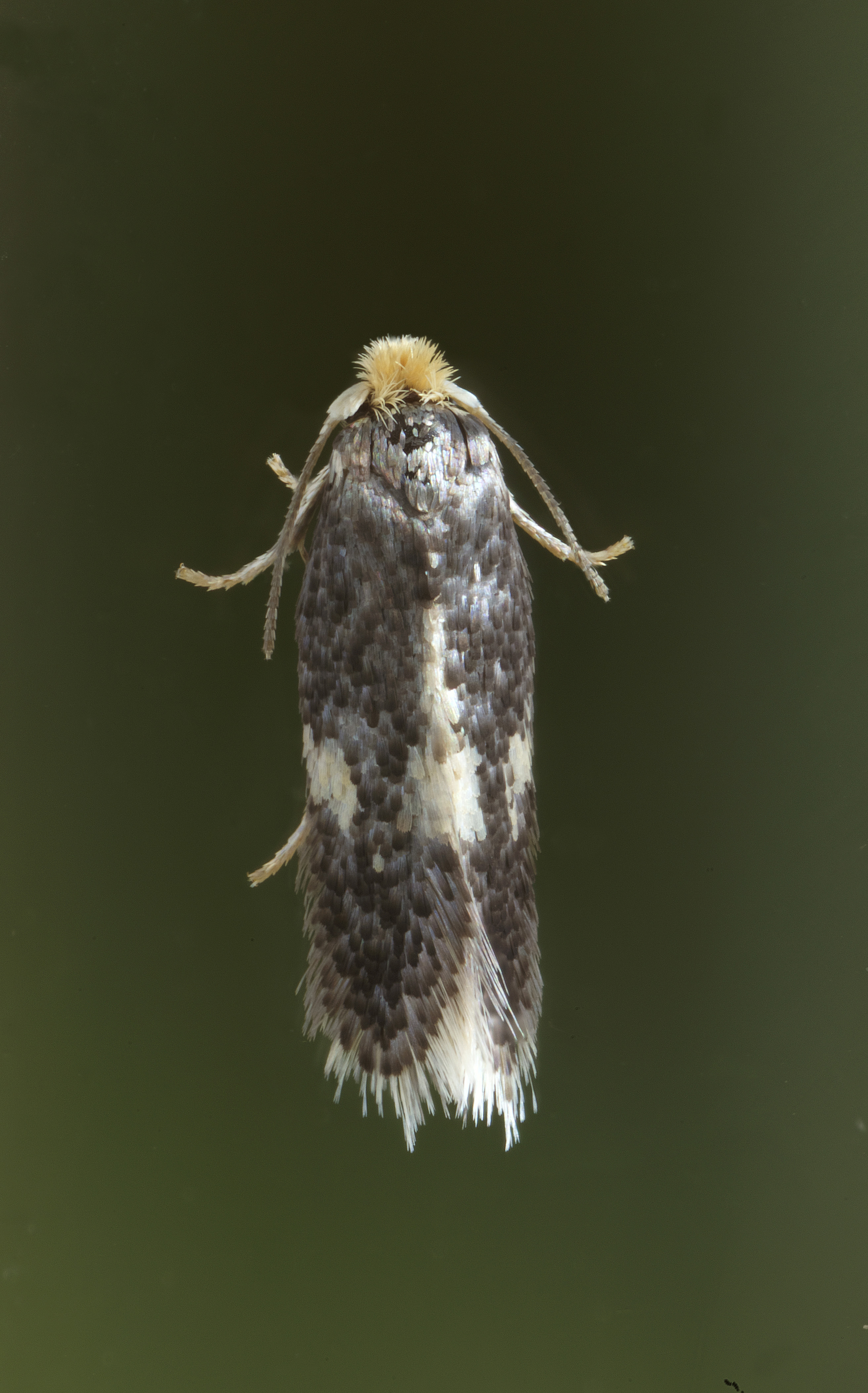

Scientific classification
- Kingdom: Animalia
- Phylum: Arthropoda
- Class: Insecta
- Order: Lepidoptera
- Family: Nepticulidae
- Genus: Ectoedemia
- Species: E. argyropeza

Binomial name
- Ectoedemia argyropeza (Zeller, 1839)

Synonyms
- List: Lyonetia argyropeza Zeller, 1839; Nepticula apicella Stainton, 1854; Nepticula argyropezella Doubleday, 1859; Ectoedemia downesi Wilkinson & Scoble, 1979; Nepticula simplicella Heinemann, 1862; Nepticula turbulentella Wocke, 1861

= Ectoedemia argyropeza =

Species of moth

Ectoedemia argyropeza is a moth of the family Nepticulidae. It is a widespread species, with a Holarctic distribution.

== Description ==
The wingspan is 7 mm. The head is ochreous-yellow with a whitish collar. The antennal eyecaps are also whitish. The forewings are dark fuscous with a small costal spot before middle, and a larger dorsal spot before the tornus whitish; outer half of cilia whitish. The hindwings are grey.

== Taxonomy ==
The name history is complex.

Adults are on wing from May to June. It is a parthenogenetic species, with males being extremely rare.

The larvae feed on aspen (Populus tremula) and quaking aspen (Populus tremuloides (ssp. downesi)). They mine the leaves of their host plant.

== Subspecies ==
- Ectoedemia argyropeza argyropeza
- Ectoedemia argyropeza downesi Wilkinson and Scoble, 1979 (North America)

== Distribution ==
It is found in most of Europe, as well as North America. In Russia, it is found in St. Petersburg, Moscow, Kaluga, Tatarstan and Kaliningrad. It is also known from north-eastern China.

== Gallery ==
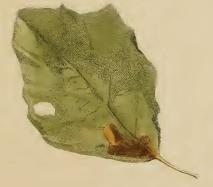
Mined leaf of Populus tremula

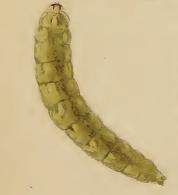
Larva

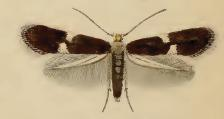
