= Crystal cells =

Type of blood cells in Drosophila

Crystal cells are one class of hemocytes (blood cells) in Drosophila melanogaster. They play a primary role in wound healing and Reactive Oxygen Species Production. They heal wounds primarily by creating a melanized mass analogous to a human blood clot or scab. Reactive oxygen species production is important for fighting off infections. Crystal cells are larger than plasmatocytes and smaller than Lamellocytes and can be identified by their prominent prophenoloxidasae (PPO) crystals, which are the main protein structures which allow them to melanize. Crystal cells have also been shown to carry oxygen.

Crystal cells in Drosophila are analogous to oenocytoids in other insects.
