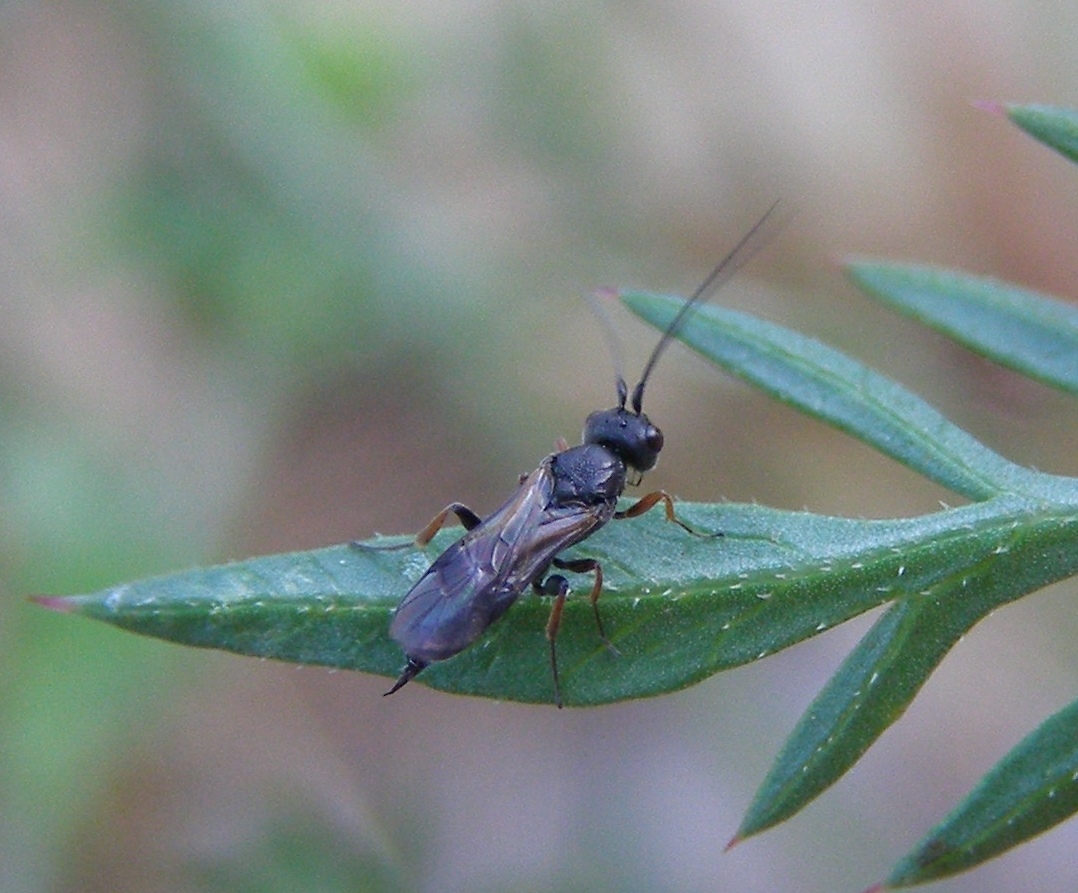
- Imago of an unidentified Ascogaster species

Scientific classification
- Kingdom: Animalia
- Phylum: Arthropoda
- Class: Insecta
- Order: Hymenoptera
- Family: Braconidae
- Subfamily: Cheloninae; Foerster, 1863

Tribes
- Adeliini; Chelonini; Odontosphaeropygini; Phanerotomini

= Cheloninae =

Subfamily of wasps

Cheloninae is a cosmopolitan subfamily of braconid parasitoid wasps.

== Description ==
Most Cheloninae are small and uniformly colored. They have a characteristic metasomal carapace formed from the fusion of the first three tergites.

== Biology ==
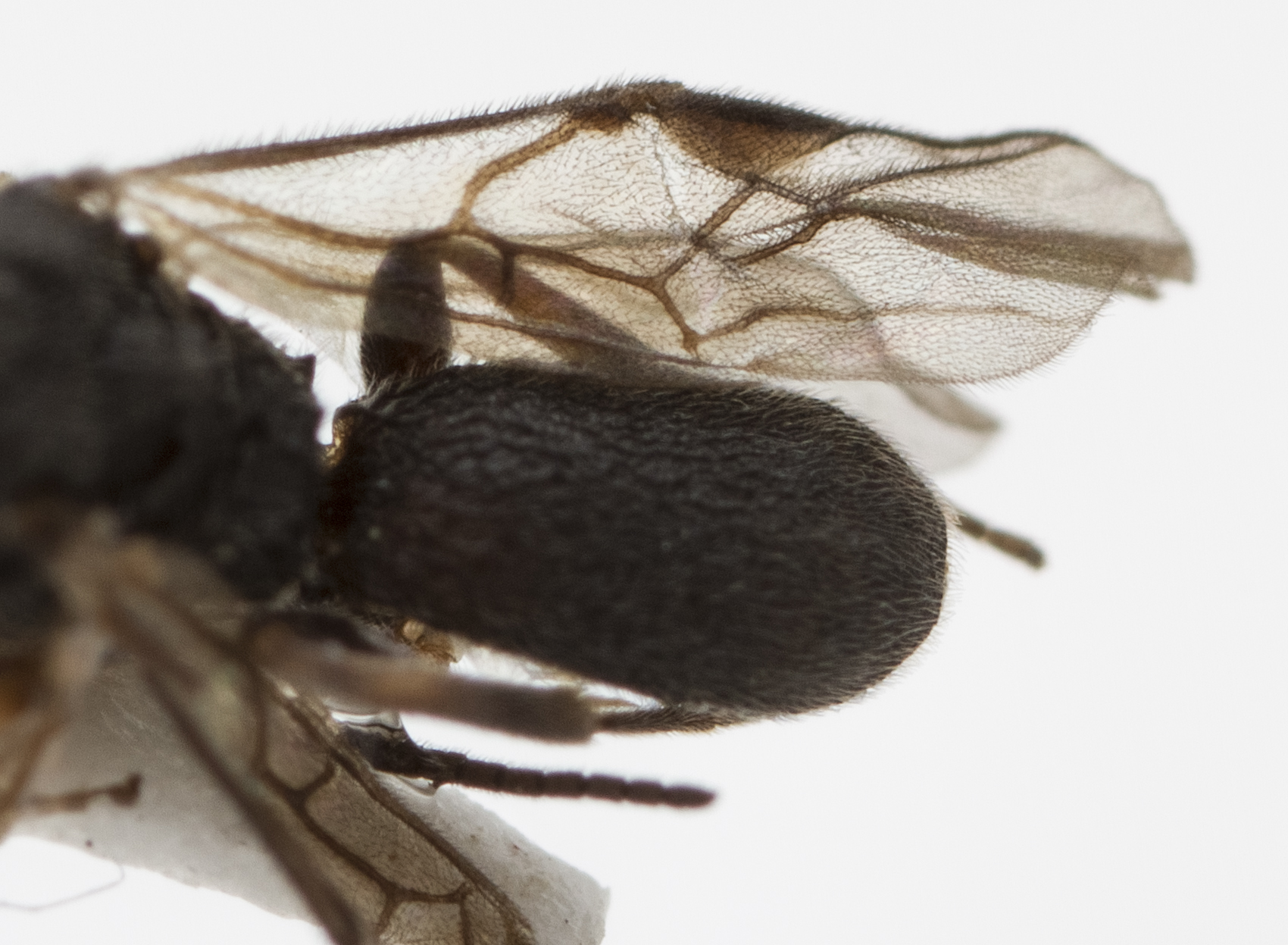
Metasomal carapace of a Chelonine

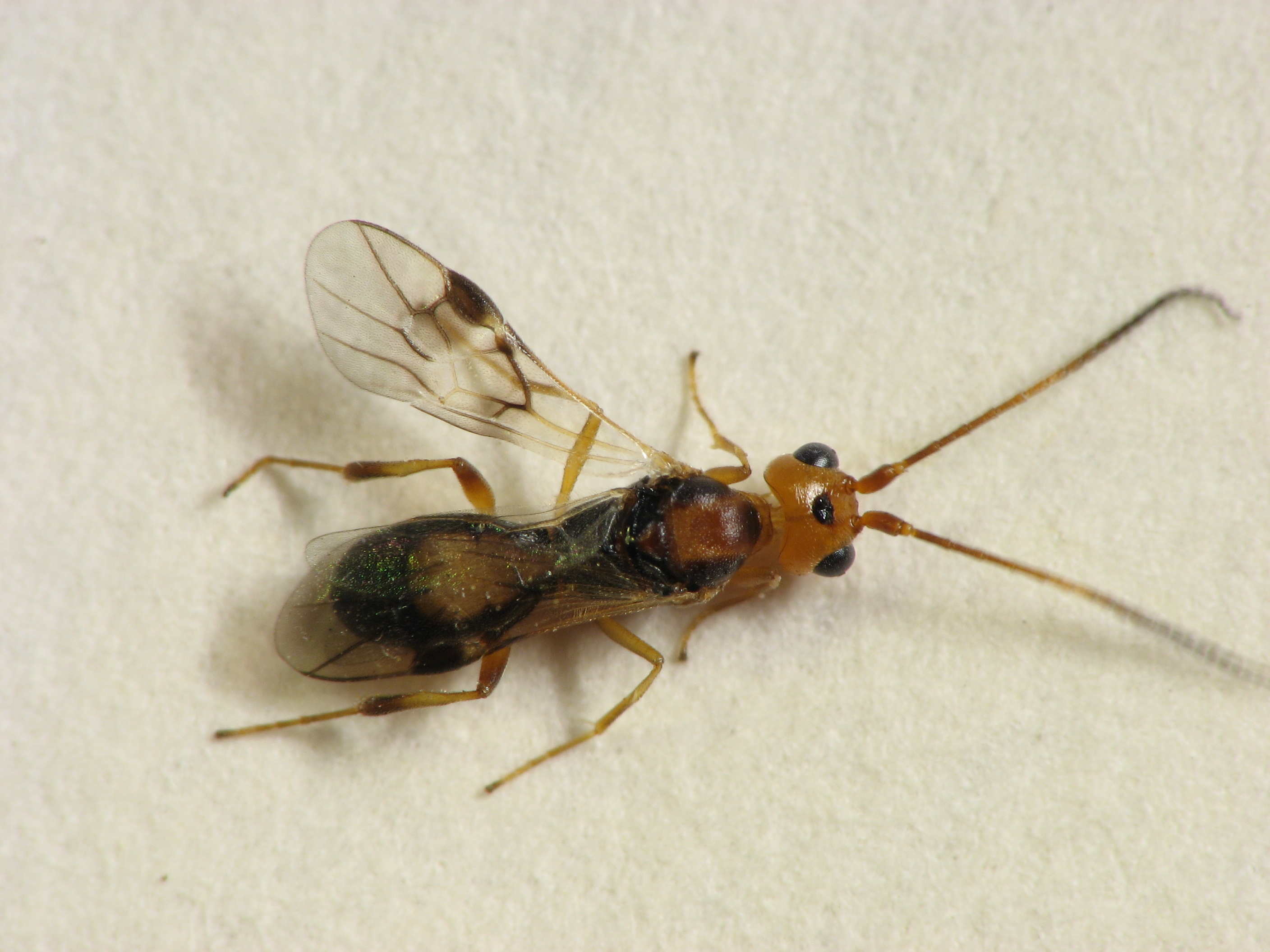
Phanerotoma sp.

They are solitary koinobionts which parasitize Lepidoptera, especially Pyraloidea and Tortricoidea, but also other taxa whose larvae bore in stems, buds or fruits. Chelonines are egg-larval parasitoids, meaning they oviposit into a host egg, but the wasp larvae do not complete development until the caterpillar has hatched and matured. Chelonines carry polydnaviruses which aid in overcoming their hosts' immune system.

== Taxonomy and phylogeny ==
The tribe Adeliini previously was thought to belong to the Adeliinae, but is now confirmed to be nested within Cheloninae.

== Genera ==
Genera placed in Cheloninae include:

=== Tribe Adeliini ===
- Adelius Haliday, 1834
- Carinadelius Ranjith & van Achterberg, 2021
- Paradelius de Saeger, 1942
- Sinadelius He and Chen, 2000
- Sculptomyriola Belokobylskij, 1988

=== Tribe Chelonini ===
- Ascogaster Wesmael, 1835 (paraphyletic?)
- Austroascogaster Kittel and Austin, 2014
- Chelonus Panzer, 1806
- †Diodontogaster Brues, 1933
- †Eobracon Cockerell, 1920
- Leptodrepana Shaw, 1990
- Megascogaster Baker, 1926

=== Tribe Odontosphaeropygini ===
- Odontosphaeropyx Cameron, 1910

=== Tribe Phanerotomini ===
- Dentigaster Zettel, 1990
- Huseyinia Koçak and Kemal, 2008
- Leptochelonus Zettel, 1990
- Phanaustrotoma Kittel and Austin, 2014
- Phanerotoma Wesmael, 1838
- Phanerotomella Szépligeti, 1900
- Phanerotomoides Zettel, 1990
- Pseudophanerotoma Zettel, 1990
- Siniphanerotomella He et al., 1994
- Wushenia Zettel, 1990
