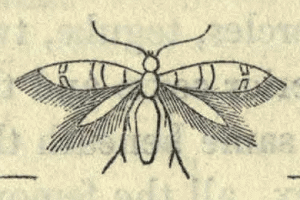
- External images

Scientific classification
- Kingdom: Animalia
- Phylum: Arthropoda
- Class: Insecta
- Order: Lepidoptera
- Family: Nepticulidae
- Genus: Ectoedemia
- Species: E. louisella

Binomial name
- Ectoedemia louisella (Sircom, 1849)

Synonyms
- Nepticula louisella Sircom, 1849; Nepticula sphendamni Hering, 1957

= Ectoedemia louisella =

Species of moth

Ectoedemia louisella is a moth of the family Nepticulidae. It is found from Great Britain to Ukraine, and from Denmark to Italy.

The wingspan is 5–8 mm. There are two to three generations per year with adults on wing from April to May and from July to October.

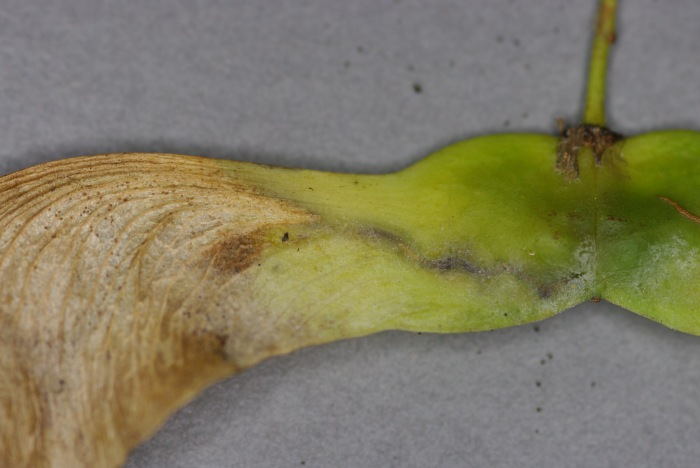
Mined Acer campestre

The larvae feed on Tatar maple (Acer tataricum) and field maple (Acer campestre) mining in the seeds (samaras).
