= Patatin =

Glycoprotein found in potatoes

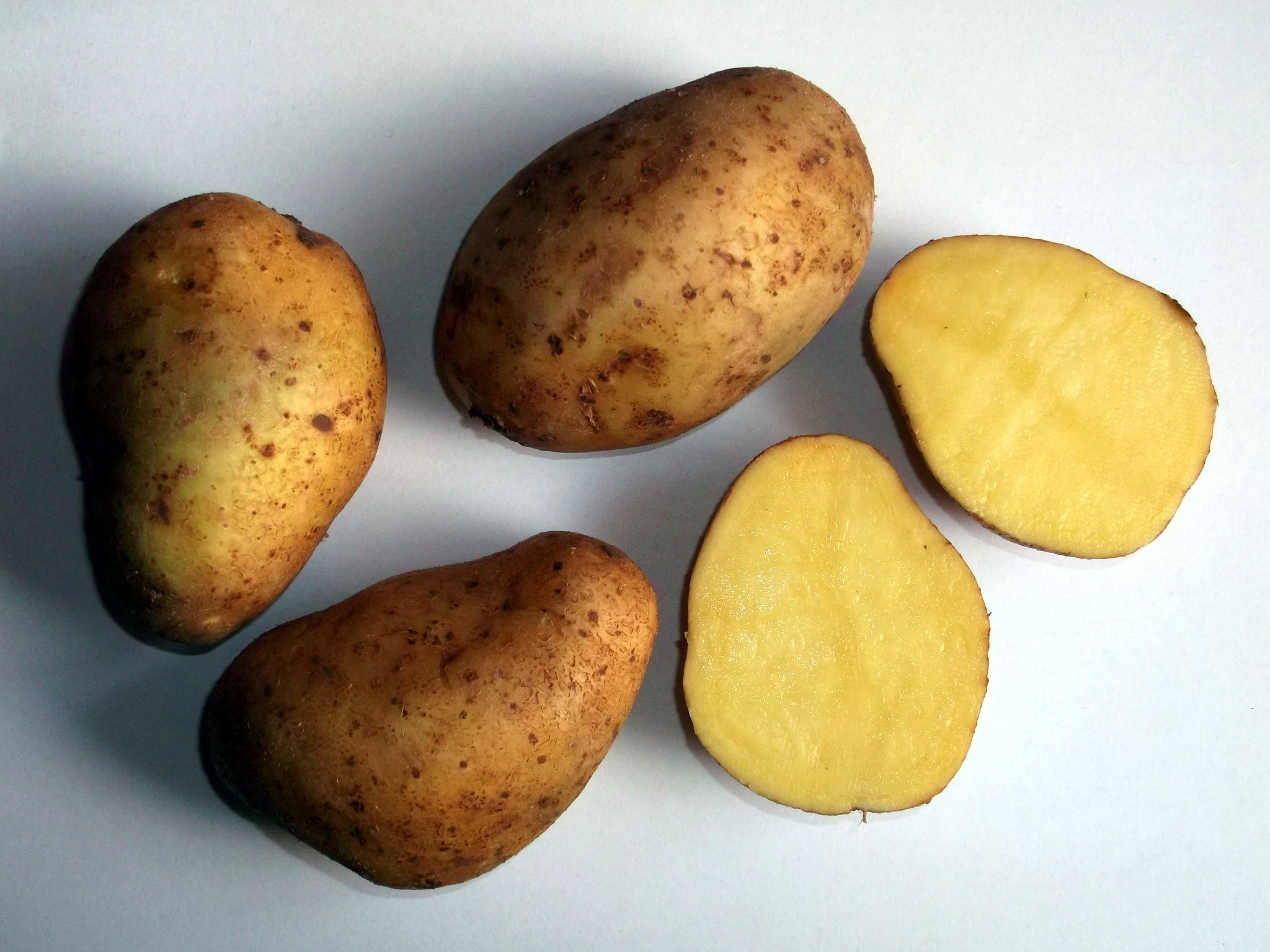
Potato tubers

Patatin is a family of glycoproteins found in potatoes (Solanum tuberosum) and is also known as tuberin as it is commonly found within vacuoles of parenchyma tissue in the tuber of the plant. They consist of about 366 amino acids all making up and isoelectric point of 4.9. They have a molecular weight ranging from 40 to 45 kDa, but are commonly found as a 80kDa dimer. The main function of patatin is as a storage protein but it also has lipase activity and can cleave fatty acids from membrane lipids. The patatin protein makes up about 40% of the soluble protein in potato tubers. Members of this protein family have also been found in animals.

== Allergy ==
Patatin is identified as a major cause of potato allergy. It has found to be similar to latex, and when in contact with open skin, there has been an increase of immunoglobulin E which causes some allergic reactions and symptoms, such as asthmatic symptoms, or atopic dermatitis. It is unclear as to why the plant does this, however it could be a potential defense mechanism against insects.
