= Adelius =

Scientific classification
- Kingdom: Animalia
- Phylum: Arthropoda
- Clade: Pancrustacea
- Class: Insecta
- Order: Hymenoptera
- Family: Braconidae
- Tribe: Adeliini
- Genus: Adelius; Haliday, 1833

Species
- See text.

Genus of wasps

Adelius is a genus of parasitoid wasps in the family Braconidae, first described in 1833 by Alexander Henry Haliday.

== Species ==
There are forty-one species:

- Adelius adeleae Shimbori & Shaw, 2019
- Adelius adrianguadamuzi Sharkey, 2021
- Adelius amplus Belokobylskij, 1998
- Adelius angustus (Papp, 1997)
- Adelius aridus (Tobias, 1967)
- Adelius australiensis (Ashmead, 1900)
- Adelius bolivariensis Bortoni & Penteado-Dias, 2019
- Adelius boliviensis Bortoni & Penteado-Dias, 2019
- Adelius caatinga Bortoni, Shimbori & Penteado-Dias, 2019
- Adelius cadmium (Papp, 2003)
- Adelius canadensis Shimbori & Shaw, 2019
- Adelius clandestinus Foerster, 1851
- Adelius coloradensis Muesebeck, 1922
- Adelius determinatus Foerster, 1851
- Adelius dubius Foerster, 1851
- Adelius ecuadoriensis Bortoni & Penteado-Dias, 2019
- Adelius erythronotus Foerster, 1851
- Adelius excelsus Bortoni & Shimbori, 2019
- Adelius fasciipennis (Rohwer, 1914)
- Adelius ferulae (Tobias, 1964)
- Adelius floridensis Shimbori & Shaw, 2019
- Adelius gauldi Shimbori & Shaw, 2019
- Adelius germanus (Haliday, 1834)
- Adelius gussakovskii (Shestakov, 1932)
- Adelius hyalinipennis Foerster, 1851
- Adelius janzeni Shimbori & Shaw, 2019
- Adelius magna (Tobias, 1967)
- Adelius monteiroi Souza-Gessner, Cerântola & Penteado-Dias, 2019
- Adelius morretesiensis Bortoni, Shimbori & Penteado-Dias, 2019
- Adelius myriolus Belokobylskij, Lee & Ku, 2024
- Adelius nigripectus Muesebeck, 1922
- Adelius panamensis Shimbori & Shaw, 2019
- Adelius parvulus Foerster, 1851
- Adelius pentagonalis Shimbori & Shaw, 2019
- Adelius pyrrhia (Beirne, 1945)
- Adelius quiteriae Souza-Gessner, Cerântola & Penteado-Dias, 2019
- Adelius rudnikovi (Perepechayenko, 1994)
- Adelius sancticaroli Bortoni, Penteado-Dias & Shimbori, 2019
- Adelius stenoculus de Saeger, 1944
- Adelius subfasciatus Haliday, 1833
- Adelius viator Foerster, 1851
