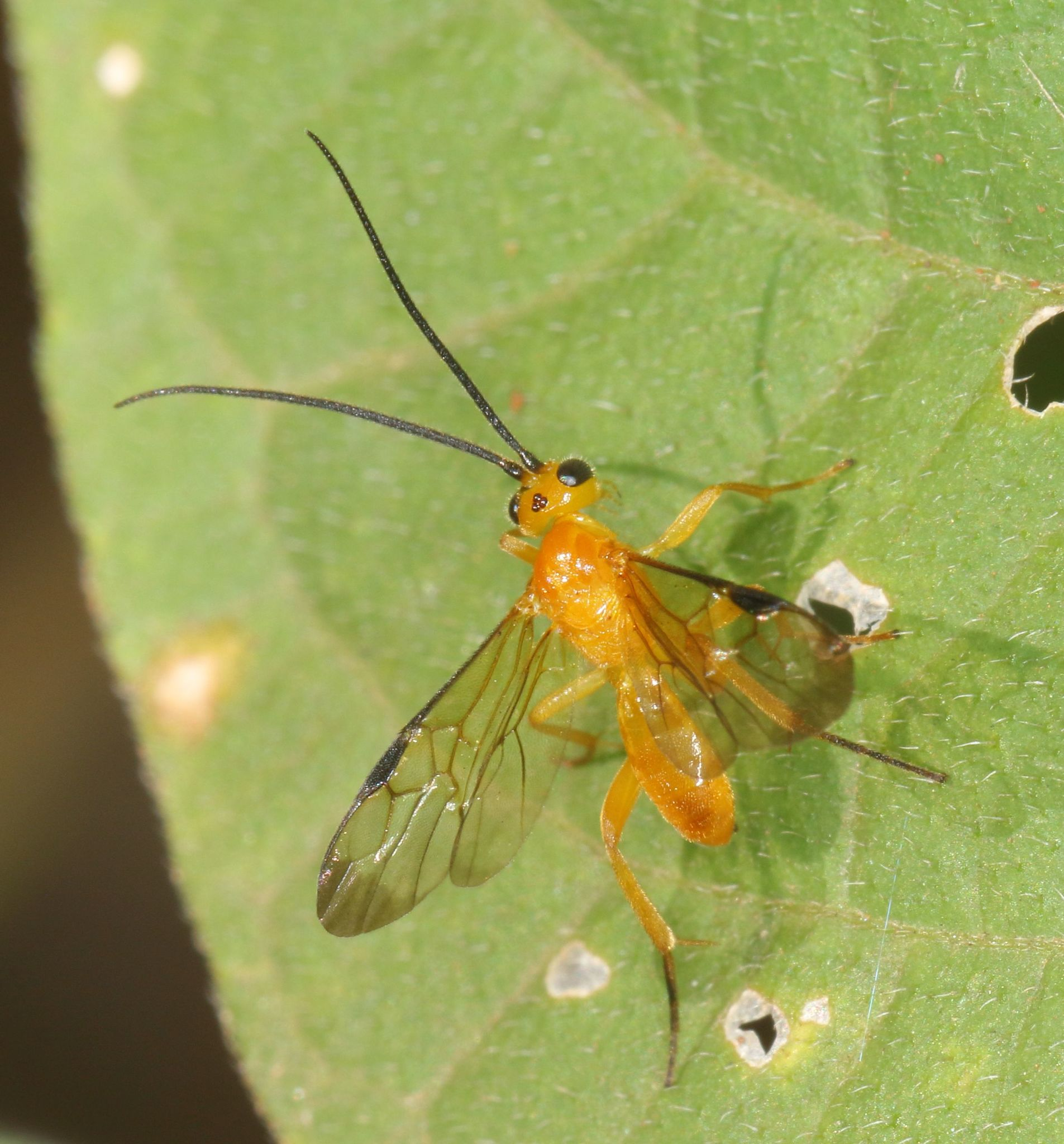
- Schoenlandella sp.

Scientific classification
- Domain: Eukaryota
- Kingdom: Animalia
- Phylum: Arthropoda
- Class: Insecta
- Order: Hymenoptera
- Family: Braconidae
- Subfamily: Cardiochilinae

= Cardiochilinae =

Subfamily of wasps

The Cardiochilinae are a subfamily of braconid parasitoid wasps. This subfamily has been treated as a tribe of Microgastrinae in the past. Some species including Toxoneuron nigriceps have been used in biocontrol programs.

== Description and distribution ==
Cardiochilines are non-cyclostome braconids with a similar appearance to Microgastrines. They possess the r-m vein of the forewing and have more than 16 flagellomeres.

Cardiochilines can be found worldwide.

== Biology ==
Cardiochilinae are solitary koinobiont endoparasitoids of caterpillars. Female Cardiochilinae inject a polydnavirus into the host during oviposition.
