= Ichnovirus =

Virus classification
- (unranked): Viriform
- Family: Polydnaviriformidae
- Genus: Ichnoviriform

Synonyms
- Ichnoviriform: Ichnoviriform ICTV 2021; Ichnovirus ICTV 1990; Polydnavirus ICTV 1984

Genus of viruses

Ichnovirus is a genus of viruses, in the family Polydnaviridae. Parasitoid wasps serve as hosts, and these wasps are themselves parasitoids of Lepidoptera. There are 21 species in this genus.

== Taxonomy ==
The genus Ichnovirus contained 21 species in ICTV version 1999a-2020: The genus Ichnoviriform contains 22 species starting ICTV version 2021 The species Ichnoviriform rostralis, previously known as Tranosema rostrale bracovirus was moved to ichnoviriform from bracoviriform (bracovirus) in 2021.

Species	Previous name, Virus name	Abbreviation
Ichnoviriform acronyctae	Diadegma acronyctae ichnovirus	DaIV
Ichnoviriform annulipedis	Hyposoter annulipes ichnovirus	HaIV
Ichnoviriform aprilis	Campoletis aprilis ichnovirus	CaIV
Ichnoviriform arjunae	Casinaria arjuna ichnovirus	CarIV
Ichnoviriform benefactoris	Olesicampe benefactor ichnovirus	ObIV
Ichnoviriform eribori	Eriborus terebrans ichnovirus	EtIV
Ichnoviriform exiguae	Hyposoter exiguae ichnovirus	HeIV
Ichnoviriform flavicinctae	Campoletis flavicincta ichnovirus	CfIV
Ichnoviriform forcipatae	Casinaria forcipata ichnovirus	CfoIV
Ichnoviriform fugitivi	Hyposoter fugitivus ichnovirus	HfIV
Ichnoviriform fumiferanae	Glypta fumiferanae ichnovirus	GfIV
Ichnoviriform geniculatae	Olesicampe geniculatae ichnovirus	OgIV
Ichnoviriform infestae	Casinaria infesta ichnovirus	CiIV
Ichnoviriform interrupti	Diadegma interruptum ichnovirus	DiIV
Ichnoviriform lymantriae	Hyposoter lymantriae ichnovirus	HlIV
Ichnoviriform montani	Enytus montanus ichnovirus	X-2
Ichnoviriform pilosuli	Hyposoter pilosulus ichnovirus	HpIV
Ichnoviriform rivalis	Hyposoter rivalis ichnovirus	HrIV
Ichnoviriform rostralis	Tranosema rostrale bracovirus	TrBV
Ichnoviriform sonorense	Campoletis sonorensis ichnovirus	CsIV
Ichnoviriform tenuifemoris	Synetaeris tenuifemur ichnovirus	StIV
Ichnoviriform terebrantis	Diadegma terebrans ichnovirus	DtIV

== Structure ==
Viruses in Ichnovirus are enveloped, with prolate ellipsoid and cylindrical geometries. Genomes are circular and segmented, around 6.0-20kb in length.

Genus	Structure	Symmetry	Capsid	Genomic arrangement	Genomic segmentation
Ichnovirus	Prolate ellipsoid		Enveloped	Circular	Segmented

== Life cycle ==
Viral replication is nuclear. DNA-templated transcription is the method of transcription. The virus exits the host cell by nuclear pore export. Parasitoid wasps in the subfamilies Banchinae and Campopleginae serve as hosts, but these wasps are themselves parasites of lepidoptera. The wasp injects one or more eggs into its host along with a quantity of virus. The virus and wasp are in a symbiotic relationship: expression of viral genes prevents the wasp's host's immune system from killing the wasp's injected egg and causes other physiological alterations that ultimately cause the parasitized host to die. Transmission routes are parental.

Genus	Host details	Tissue tropism	Entry details	Release details	Replication site	Assembly site	Transmission
Ichnovirus	Parasitoid wasps (Ichneumonidae)	Hemocytes; fat bodies	Unknown	Lysis; budding	Nucleus	Nucleus	Unknown
