= List of Lagriinae genera =

These genera belong to the subfamily Lagriinae, long-jointed beetles.

== Lagriinae genera ==
- Acerogria Borchmann, 1936 (Australasia)
- Acritolagria Borchmann, 1916 (tropical Africa)
- Acropachia Mäklin, 1875 (the Neotropics)
- Acutogria Merkl, 1988 (Australasia)
- Adelium W. Kirby, 1819 (Australasia)
- Adelodemus Haag-Rutenberg, 1878 (Australasia)
- Adelonia Laporte, 1840 (North America and the Neotropics)
- Adelozotypus Kaszab, 1982 (Australasia)
- Adosogria Borchmann, 1936 (tropical Africa)
- Adynata Fåhraeus, 1870 (the Palearctic and tropical Africa)
- Aediatorix Bates, 1868 (Indomalaya)
- Afrolaena Endrödy-Younga & Schawaller, 2002 (tropical Africa)
- Alagria Borchmann, 1916 (tropical Africa)
- Allogria Borchmann, 1916 (tropical Africa)
- Amorphochirus Gebien, 1904 (tropical Africa)
- Anaedus Blanchard, 1842 (North America, the Neotropics, the Palearctic, tropical Africa, and Indomalaya)
- Anisostira Borchmann, 1915 (the Palearctic and Indomalaya)
- Anotoma Borchmann, 1936 (tropical Africa)
- Antennoluprops Schawaller, 2007 (tropical Africa)
- Aoupinia Matthews, 2003 (Australasia)
- Apasis Pascoe, 1869 (Australasia)
- Apocryphodes Matthews, 1998 (Australasia)
- Arcothymus Pascoe, 1866 (Australasia)
- Ardoiniellus Schawaller, 2013 (tropical Africa)
- Arthromacra W. Kirby, 1837 (North America, the Palearctic, and Indomalaya)
- Arunogria Merkl, 1991 (Indomalaya)
- Asiopus Sharp, 1892 (the Neotropics)
- Astatira Borchmann, 1921 (the Neotropics)
- Aulonogria Borchmann, 1929 (Indomalaya)
- Barsenis Pascoe, 1887 (the Neotropics)
- Bellendenum Matthews, 1998 (Australasia)
- Bequaertiella Pic, 1914 (tropical Africa)
- Blepegenes Pascoe, 1868 (Australasia)
- Bluops Carter, 1914 (Australasia)
- Bolitrium Gebien, 1914 (Indomalaya)
- Bolusculus Matthews, 1998 (Australasia)
- Borchmannia Pic, 1912 (Indomalaya)
- Borneolaena Schawaller, 1998 (Indomalaya)
- Bothrichara Borchmann, 1916 (Australasia)
- Bothrionota Borchmann, 1936 (Indomalaya)
- Bothriostira Borchmann, 1936 (tropical Africa)
- Bothynogria Borchmann, 1916 (the Palearctic and Indomalaya)
- Brycopia Pascoe, 1869 (Australasia)
- Calogria Borchmann, 1916 (Australasia)
- Calostegia Westwood, 1843 (tropical Africa)
- Capeluprops Schawaller, 2011 (tropical Africa)
- Cardiothorax Motschulsky, 1860 (Australasia)
- Casnonidea Fairmaire, 1882 (tropical Africa, Indomalaya, and Australasia)
- Catamerus Fairmaire, 1887 (tropical Africa)
- Centorus Mulsant, 1854 (the Palearctic and tropical Africa)
- Ceratoma Borchmann, 1916*
- Cerogria Borchmann, 1911 (the Palearctic, tropical Africa, Indomalaya, and Australasia)
- Cerostira Borchmann, 1942 (tropical Africa)
- Chaerodes White, 1846 (Australasia)
- Chaetyllus Pascoe, 1860 (the Neotropics)
- Chilenolagria Pic, 1936 (the Neotropics)
- Chirocharis Kolbe, 1903 (tropical Africa)
- Chiroscelis Lamarck, 1804 (tropical Africa)
- Chlorophila Semenov, 1891 (the Palearctic and Indomalaya)
- Chrysolagria Seidlitz, 1898 (the Palearctic and tropical Africa)
- Colparthrum Kirsch, 1866 (the Neotropics)
- Coripera Pascoe, 1866 (Australasia)
- Cossyphus G.-A. Olivier, 1791 (the Palearctic, tropical Africa, Indomalaya, and Australasia)
- Costatosora Pic, 1934 (tropical Africa)
- Costiferolagria Pic, 1915 (Indomalaya)
- Coxelinus Fairmaire, 1869 (tropical Africa)
- Ctenogria Borchmann, 1916 (Indomalaya)
- Curtolyprops Pic, 1917 (tropical Africa)
- Cylindrosora Borchmann, 1936 (Indomalaya)
- Cylindrostira Borchmann, 1936 (Indomalaya)
- Cymbeba Pascoe, 1866 (Australasia)
- Daedrosis Bates, 1868 (Australasia)
- Davaona Borchmann, 1930 (Indomalaya)
- Derolagria Borchmann, 1916 (tropical Africa)
- Derostira Fairmaire, 1897 (tropical Africa)
- Diaspirus Matthews, 1998 (Australasia)
- Dichastops Gerstaecker, 1871 (tropical Africa)
- Dicyrtodes Matthews, 1998 (Australasia)
- Diemenoma Matthews, 1998 (Australasia)
- Diorhychina Borchmann, 1936 (tropical Africa)
- Disema Mäklin, 1875 (the Neotropics)
- Disemorpha Pic, 1917 (the Neotropics)
- Donaciolagria Pic, 1914 (the Palearctic and Indomalaya)
- Dorrigonum Matthews, 1998 (Australasia)
- Doyenia Matthews & Lawrence, 2005 (Australasia)
- Dysodera Borchmann, 1936 (tropical Africa)
- Dysopinus Borchmann, 1936 (Indomalaya)
- Eccoptostira Borchmann, 1936 (tropical Africa)
- Ecnocera Borchmann, 1936 (tropical Africa)
- Ecnolagria Borchmann, 1916 (Australasia)
- Emydodes Pascoe, 1860 (the Neotropics)
- Endustomus Brême, 1842 (tropical Africa)
- Enicmosoma Gebien, 1922 (tropical Africa)
- Enigmatica Ferrer, 2005 (tropical Africa)
- Entypodera Gerstaecker, 1871 (tropical Africa)
- Epicydes Champion, 1889 (the Neotropics)
- Epomidus Matthews, 1998 (Australasia)
- Eschatoporis Blaisdell, 1906 (North America)
- Euclarkia Lea, 1919 (Australasia)
- Eulea Carter, 1937 (Australasia)
- Exadelium Watt, 1992 (Australasia)
- Exeniotis Pascoe, 1871 (the Neotropics)
- Exostira Borchmann, 1925 (Indomalaya)
- Falsolagria Pic, 1927 (the Neotropics)
- Falsonemostira Pic, 1917 (Indomalaya)
- Falsotithassa Pic, 1934 (Indomalaya)
- Flabellolagria Pic, 1927 (tropical Africa)
- Gabonisca Fairmaire, 1894 (tropical Africa)
- Gamaxus Bates, 1868 (the Neotropics)
- Gebienia Borchmann, 1921 (the Neotropics)
- Gondvanadelium Kaszab, 1981 (the Neotropics)
- Goniadera Perty, 1832 (the Neotropics)
- Grabulax Kanda, 2016 (the Neotropics)
- Gronophora Borchmann, 1916 (Australasia)
- Helogria Borchmann, 1916 (Indomalaya)
- Hemipristula Bouchard & Bousquet, 2021 (tropical Africa)
- Hosohamudama Masumoto, 1988 (Indomalaya)
- Hovadelium Ardoin, 1962 (tropical Africa)
- Hypolaenopsis Masumoto, 2001 (the Palearctic)
- Hypostatira Fairmaire, 1889 (the Neotropics)
- Hysterarthron J. Thomson, 1864 (Indomalaya)
- Impressosora Pic, 1952 (tropical Africa)
- Indenicmosoma Ardoin, 1964 (the Palearctic and Indomalaya)
- Iscanus Fauvel, 1904 (Australasia and Oceania)
- Isocera Borchmann, 1909 (the Neotropics)
- Isopteron Hope, 1841 (Australasia)
- Kaindilagria Merkl, 1988 (Australasia)
- Kaszabadelium Watt, 1992 (Australasia)
- Kershawia Lea, 1905 (Australasia)
- Kuschelus Kaszab, 1982 (Australasia)
- Laena Dejean, 1821 (the Palearctic and Indomalaya)
- Lagria Fabricius, 1775 (the Neotropics, tropical Africa, Indomalaya, Australasia, and Oceania)
- Lagriodema Borchmann, 1930 (Indomalaya)
- Lagriogonia Fairmaire, 1891 (the Palearctic)
- Lagriomima Pic, 1934 (Indomalaya and Australasia)
- Lagriopsis Borchmann, 1916 (Australasia)
- Lagriostira Fairmaire, 1883 (tropical Africa)
- Leptinostethus Borchmann, 1936 (tropical Africa)
- Leptogastrus W.J. MacLeay, 1872 (Australasia)
- Leptosora Borchmann, 1936 (tropical Africa)
- Licinoma Pascoe, 1869 (the Neotropics and Australasia)
- Lobophilomorphus Pic, 1911 (tropical Africa)
- Lopholagria Borchmann, 1916 (tropical Africa)
- Lophophyllus Fairmaire, 1887 (tropical Africa)
- Lorelus Sharp, 1876 (the Neotropics, Australasia, and Oceania)
- Lorona Borchmann, 1936 (Indomalaya)
- Lucidolaena Endrödy-Younga & Schawaller, 2002 (tropical Africa)
- Luprops Hope, 1833 (the Palearctic, tropical Africa, Indomalaya, and Australasia)
- Lyprochelyda Fairmaire, 1899 (tropical Africa)
- Macrocasnonidea Pic, 1934 (Indomalaya)
- Macrolagria Lewis, 1895 (the Palearctic)
- Malaiseum Borchmann, 1941 (Indomalaya)
- Malayoscelis Schawaller, 2003 (Indomalaya)
- Mallogria Borchmann, 1936 (tropical Africa)
- Meniscophorus Champion, 1889 (the Neotropics)
- Merklia Chen, 1997 (Indomalaya)
- Meropria Borchmann, 1921 (the Neotropics)
- Mesopatrum Broun, 1893 (Australasia)
- Mesotretis Bates, 1872 (Australasia)
- Metallonotus Gray, 1832 (tropical Africa)
- Metriolagria Merkl, 1987 (Australasia)
- Microanaedus Pic, 1923 (tropical Africa)
- Microcalcar Pic, 1925 (tropical Africa)
- Microgoniadera Pic, 1917 (the Neotropics)
- Microlyprops Kaszab, 1939 (Indomalaya)
- Micropedinus Lewis, 1894 (the Palearctic, Indomalaya, and Australasia)
- Mimoborchmania Pic, 1934 (Indomalaya)
- Mimocellus Wasmann, 1904 (tropical Africa)
- Mimolaena Ardoin, 1962 (tropical Africa)
- Mimolagria Pic, 1927 (the Neotropics)
- Mimuroplatopsis Borchmann, 1936 (tropical Africa)
- Minasius Pic, 1932 (the Neotropics)
- Montaguea Kaszab, 1982 (Australasia)
- Monteithium Matthews, 1998 (Australasia)
- Myrmecopeltoides Kaszab, 1973 (the Neotropics)
- Natalostira Pic, 1913 (tropical Africa)
- Neoadelium Carter, 1908 (Australasia)
- Neogria Borchmann, 1911 (Indomalaya)
- Nepalolaena Schawaller, 2001 (Indomalaya)
- Nevermanniella Borchmann, 1936 (the Neotropics)
- Nolicima Matthews, 1998 (Australasia)
- Nothogria Borchmann, 1916 (Australasia)
- Nototrintus Carter, 1924 (Australasia)
- Ocularisora Pic, 1934 (tropical Africa)
- Odontocerostira Merkl, 2007 (the Palearctic and Indomalaya)
- Odontogria Borchmann, 1936 (Indomalaya)
- Oreogria Merkl, 1988 (Australasia)
- Oroptera Borchmann, 1916 (Australasia)
- Othryades Champion, 1889 (the Neotropics)
- Ozotypoides Kaszab, 1982 (Australasia)
- Pachystira Chen, 1997 (Indomalaya)
- Paralorelopsis Marcuzzi, 1994 (the Neotropics)
- Paratenetus Spinola, 1845 (North America and the Neotropics)
- Passalocharis Koch, 1954 (tropical Africa)
- Penadelium Matthews, 1998 (the Neotropics)
- Pengalenganus Pic, 1917 (Indomalaya and Australasia)
- Periatrum Sharp, 1886 (Australasia)
- Pezodontus Dejean, 1834 (tropical Africa)
- Phaedogria Borchmann, 1936 (Indomalaya)
- Pheloneis Pascoe, 1866 (Australasia)
- Pheugonius Fairmaire, 1899 (Indomalaya)
- Phobelius Blanchard, 1842 (the Neotropics)
- Phymatestes Pascoe, 1866 (the Neotropics)
- Physogria Borchmann, 1916 (tropical Africa)
- Physolagria Fairmaire, 1891 (tropical Africa)
- Piciella Borchmann, 1936 (the Neotropics)
- Porrolagria Kolbe, 1883 (tropical Africa)
- Prateus Leconte, 1862 (North America and the Neotropics)
- Prioproctus Kolbe, 1903 (tropical Africa)
- Prioscelides Kolbe, 1889 (tropical Africa)
- Prioscelis Hope, 1841 (tropical Africa)
- Pristophilus Kolbe, 1903 (tropical Africa)
- Prolaena Kaszab, 1980 (Indomalaya)
- Pseudanaedus Gebien, 1921 (tropical Africa)
- Pseudesarcus Champion, 1913 (the Neotropics)
- Pseudeutrapela Pic, 1952 (tropical Africa)
- Pseudobyrsax Kaszab, 1982 (Australasia)
- Pseudocasnonidea Borchmann, 1936 (Indomalaya)
- Pseudocilibe Kaszab, 1982 (Australasia)
- Pseudolagria Champion, 1917 (the Neotropics)
- Pseudolyprops Fairmaire, 1882 (Australasia)
- Pseudopatrum Sharp, 1886 (Australasia)
- Pseudostira Fairmaire, 1903 (tropical Africa)
- Pycnocerus Westwood, 1844 (tropical Africa)
- Rhacolaena Kaszab, 1979 (Indomalaya)
- Rhagostira Borchmann, 1936 (tropical Africa)
- Rhaibodera Borchmann, 1921 (the Neotropics)
- Rhaibogria Borchmann, 1936 (tropical Africa)
- Rhosaces Champion, 1889 (the Neotropics)
- Rhypasma Pascoe, 1862 (the Neotropics)
- Robustosora Pic, 1954 (tropical Africa)
- Rouyerus Pic, 1911 (Indomalaya)
- Ruandania Pic, 1955 (tropical Africa)
- Schevodera Borchmann, 1936 (Indomalaya)
- Schevogria Borchmann, 1936 (tropical Africa)
- Seirotrana Pascoe, 1866 (Australasia)
- Sipolisia Fairmaire, 1889 (the Neotropics)
- Sora Walker, 1859 (the Palearctic, tropical Africa, Indomalaya, and Australasia)
- Sphargeris Pascoe, 1860 (Australasia)
- Sphinctoderus Fairmaire, 1903 (Indomalaya)
- Sphingocorse Gebien, 1921 (tropical Africa and Indomalaya)
- Sphragidophorus Champion, 1889 (the Neotropics)
- Spinadaenus Pic, 1921 (Indomalaya)
- Spinolagriella Pic, 1955 (tropical Africa)
- Spinolyprops Pic, 1917 (the Palearctic, tropical Africa, and Indomalaya)
- Splichalia Reitter, 1913 (the Palearctic)
- Staius Fairmaire, 1896 (tropical Africa)
- Statira Lepeletier & Audinet-Serville, 1828 (North America and the Neotropics)
- Statiropsis Borchmann, 1912 (the Neotropics)
- Stenadelium Watt, 1992 (Australasia)
- Stenolagria Merkl, 1987 (Australasia)
- Stratodemus Gebien, 1921 (tropical Africa)
- Strongylagria Pic, 1915 (the Palearctic)
- Sulcolagria Pic, 1955 (tropical Africa)
- Taiwanolagria Masumoto, 1988 (the Palearctic and Indomalaya)
- Terametus Motschulsky, 1869 (tropical Africa)
- Thoracostira Borchmann, 1936 (the Neotropics)
- Thoseus Pic, 1925 (Indomalaya)
- Tithassa Pascoe, 1860 (the Neotropics)
- Tomogria Merkl, 1988 (Australasia)
- Uroplatopsis Champion, 1889 (the Neotropics)
- Valdivium Matthews, 1998 (the Neotropics)
- Wattadelium Emberson, 2000 (Australasia)
- Xanthalia Fairmaire, 1894 (the Palearctic, tropical Africa, and Indomalaya)
- Xanthicles Champion, 1886 (the Neotropics)
- Xenocerogria Merkl, 2007 (the Palearctic and Indomalaya)
- Xenogena Borchmann, 1936 (tropical Africa)
- Xenolagria Merkl, 1987 (Australasia)
- Xenostethus Bates, 1868 (tropical Africa)
- Yarranum Matthews, 1998 (Australasia)
- Zeadelium Watt, 1992 (Australasia)
- † Gonialaena Nabozhenko, Bukejs & Telnov, 2019
- † Yantaroxenos Nabozhenko, Kirejtshuk & Merkl, 2016
