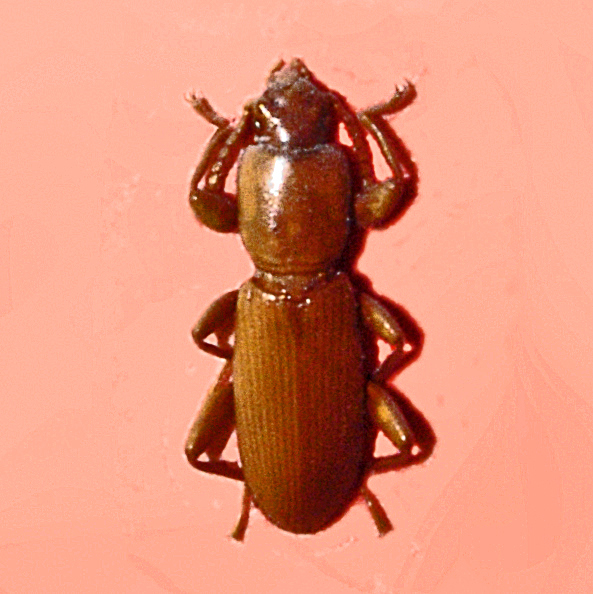
- Belopus elongatus

Scientific classification
- Kingdom: Animalia
- Phylum: Arthropoda
- Class: Insecta
- Order: Coleoptera
- Suborder: Polyphaga
- Infraorder: Cucujiformia
- Family: Tenebrionidae
- Tribe: Belopini
- Genus: Belopus; Gebien, 1911

= Belopus =

Genus of beetles

Belopus is a genus of darkling beetles in the subfamily Lagriinae.

== Species ==
- Belopus crassipes (Fischer de Waldheim, 1844)
- Belopus csikii Reitter, 1920
- Belopus elongatus (Herbst, 1797)
- Belopus heydeni (Zoufal, 1893)
- Belopus proceroides Leo, 1984
- Belopus procerus (Mulsant, 1854)
- Belopus raffrayi (Fairmaire, 1873)
- Belopus reitteri (Zoufal, 1893)
- Belopus sulcatus (Fischer de Waldheim, 1844)
- Belopus tibialis (Zoufal, 1893)
