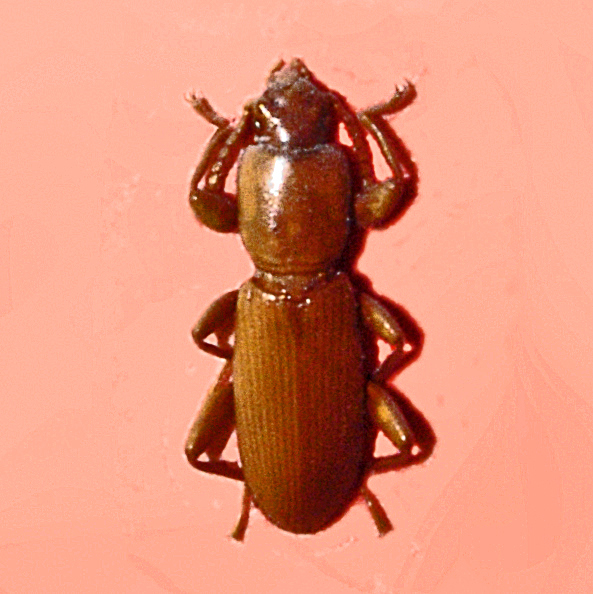
- Belopus elongatus. Museum specimen

Scientific classification
- Kingdom: Animalia
- Phylum: Arthropoda
- Class: Insecta
- Order: Coleoptera
- Suborder: Polyphaga
- Infraorder: Cucujiformia
- Family: Tenebrionidae
- Genus: Belopus
- Species: B. elongatus

Binomial name
- Belopus elongatus (Herbst, 1797 )

Synonyms
- Tenebrio elongatus Herbst, 1797; Centorus elongatus (Herbst, 1797)

= Belopus elongatus =

Species of beetle

Belopus elongatus (synonym Centorus (Belopus) elongatus Herbst, 1797) is a species of darkling beetles in the subfamily Lagriinae.

== Subspecies ==
There are two subspecies:

- Belopus elongatus elongatus (Herbst, 1797)
- Belopus elongatus ecalcaratus (Seidlitz, 1896)

== Distribution ==
This species can be found in the Canary Islands, Madeira, Malta, Sardinia, and Sicily, and possibly the Italian mainland.
