= Adeliini =

Adeliini may refer to:

- Adeliini (beetle), a tribe of beetles in the family Tenebrionidae
- Adeliini (wasp), a tribe of wasps in the family Braconidae
