= Corticeus cephalotes =

Scientific classification
- Kingdom: Animalia
- Phylum: Arthropoda
- Class: Insecta
- Order: Coleoptera
- Suborder: Polyphaga
- Infraorder: Cucujiformia
- Family: Tenebrionidae
- Genus: Corticeus
- Species: C. cephalotes

Binomial name
- Corticeus cephalotes (Gebien, 1913)

Synonyms
- Hypophloeus cephalotes Gebien, 1913; Corticeus cephalotes (Gebien, 1914); Hypophloeus cornutus Pic, 1914; Hypophloeus palawanus Pic, 1945; Hypophloeus cornutus var. subcastaneus Pic, 1945; Hypophloeus andaiensis Pic, 1946

Species of beetle

Corticeus (Stenophloeus) cephalotes is a species of darkling beetle distributed all over Oriental region and Vanuatu.

== Description ==
The body length is about 3.14 to 4.46 mm.
