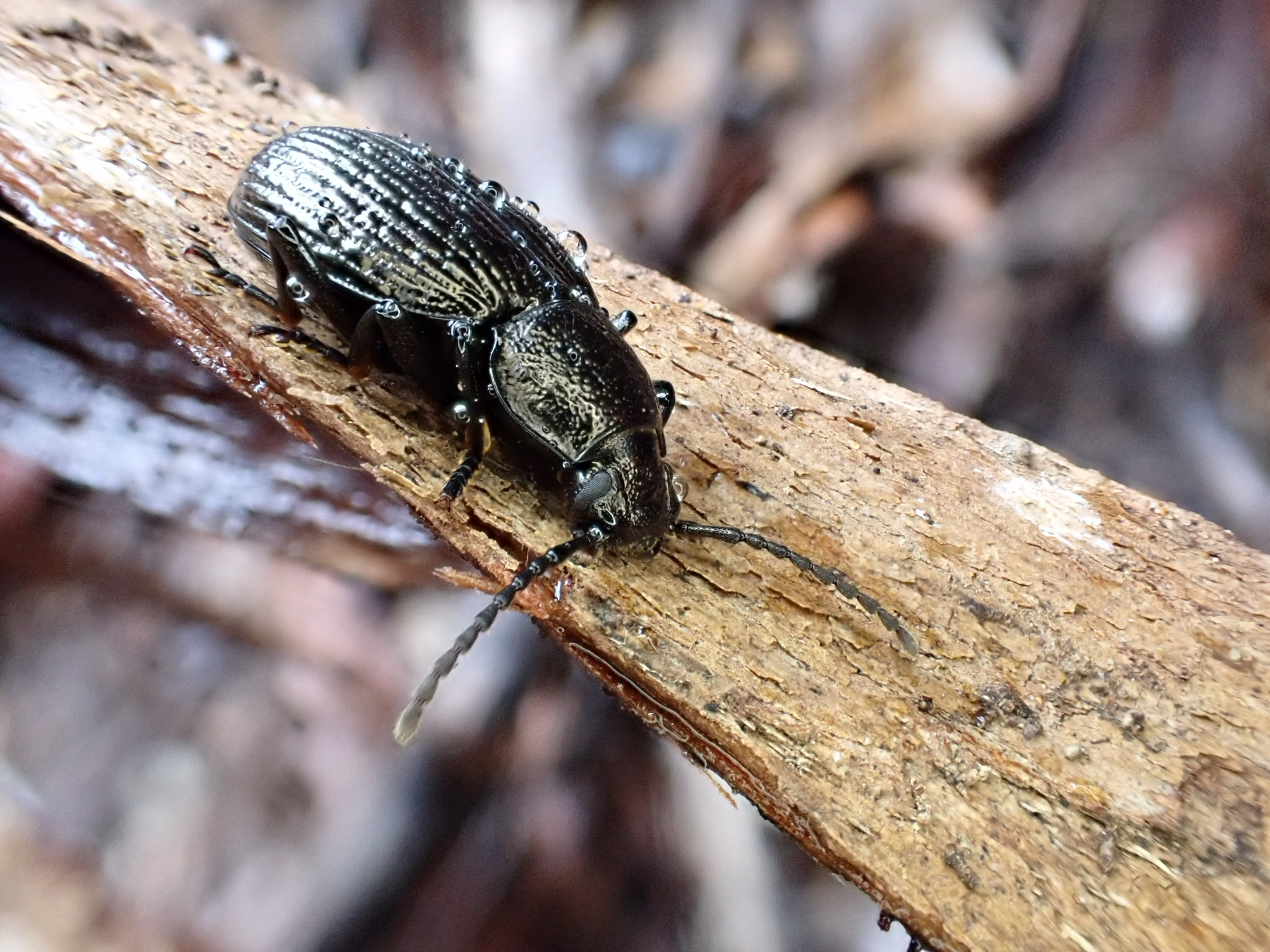
- Adelium tenebrioides

Scientific classification
- Kingdom: Animalia
- Phylum: Arthropoda
- Clade: Pancrustacea
- Class: Insecta
- Order: Coleoptera
- Suborder: Polyphaga
- Infraorder: Cucujiformia
- Family: Tenebrionidae
- Tribe: Adeliini
- Genus: Adelium; Kirby, 1818

= Adelium =

Genus of beetles

Adelium is a genus of Tenebrioninae (darkling beetles).

== Species ==
- Adelium abbreviatum
- Adelium abnorme
- Adelium aequale
- Adelium aerarium
- Adelium alpicola
- Adelium angulicolle
- Adelium arboricola
- Adelium augurale
- Adelium auratum
- Adelium barbatum
- Adelium bassi
- Adelium breve
- Adelium brevicorne
- Adelium breviusculum
- Adelium browni
- Adelium burneti
- Adelium calosomoides
- Adelium canaliculatum
- Adelium capillatum
- Adelium capitatum
- Adelium cheesmani
- Adelium coeruleum
- Adelium comatum
- Adelium coxi
- Adelium cuprescens
- Adelium cyaneum
- Adelium davisi
- Adelium distortipes
- Adelium dubium
- Adelium ellipticum
- Adelium fergusoni
- Adelium flavicorne
- Adelium flavitarsis
- Adelium geminatum
- Adelium globulosum
- Adelium goudiei
- Adelium hackeri
- Adelium harrisoni
- Adelium helmsi
- Adelium heterodoxum
- Adelium hirsutum
- Adelium homogeneum
- Adelium inconspicuum
- Adelium interruptum
- Adelium irregulare
- Adelium licinoides
- Adelium lindense
- Adelium mackayense
- Adelium mccullochi
- Adelium minor
- Adelium monilicorne
- Adelium murex
- Adelium musgravei
- Adelium neboissi
- Adelium negligens
- Adelium obtusum
- Adelium occidentale
- Adelium orphana
- Adelium ovipenne
- Adelium panageicolle
- Adelium parvulum
- Adelium pestiferum
- Adelium pilosum
- Adelium plicigerum
- Adelium porcatum
- Adelium pulchellum
- Adelium punctatissimum
- Adelium punctipenne
- Adelium pustulosum
- Adelium reductum
- Adelium regulare
- Adelium reticulatum
- Adelium rotundum
- Adelium rugicolle
- Adelium scytalicum
- Adelium similatum
- Adelium sloanei
- Adelium spinicolle
- Adelium steropoides
- Adelium striatum
- Adelium strigipenne
- Adelium subdepressum
- Adelium sublaevigatum
- Adelium subsulcatum
- Adelium taylori
- Adelium tenebroides
- Adelium tropicum
- Adelium vesiculatum
- Adelium vicarium
- Adelium violaceum
