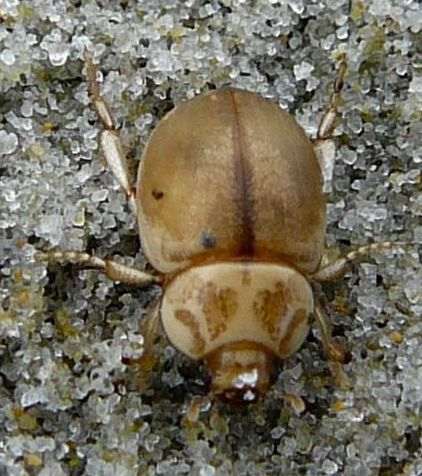

Scientific classification
- Kingdom: Animalia
- Phylum: Arthropoda
- Class: Insecta
- Order: Coleoptera
- Suborder: Polyphaga
- Infraorder: Cucujiformia
- Family: Tenebrionidae
- Genus: Chaerodes
- Species: C. trachyscelides

Binomial name
- Chaerodes trachyscelides White, 1846

= Seaweed darkling beetle =

Species of beetle

The seaweed darkling beetle (Chaerodes trachyscelides), also known by its Māori name pāpapa, is a flightless, nocturnal beetle found on sandy beaches in New Zealand.

== Description ==
The seaweed darkling beetle is about 7mm long with a rotund body. It has 3 pairs of legs that are modified to help it burrow into sand.

Although the underside of adult beetles is a pale whitish yellow in colour, its hardened forewings (elytra) are polymorphic. The colour of an individual matches that of the sand where it lives. On beaches with black sand, around 96% of beetles are a brown-black colour. On beaches with pale sand, around 98% of beetles are a pale milky colour. Spotted and mottled beetles have also been observed on beaches with mixed sand types.

The larva is white and u-shaped and resembles a small wire worm.

== Behaviour ==
The seaweed darkling beetle lives in a narrow band at the top of the high tidal zone. During the day, it burrows up to 30 centimetres below the sand surface, often under seaweed and marine algae. It emerges after dark to feed on cast up seaweed and marine algae.

When seaweed is picked up by predatory seabirds, it has been observed as falling out, running a short distance, and burrowing back into the sand.

The beetle is thought to have an internal biological clock. Despite being kept in total darkness, the timing of its activity changed with the tidal cycle, which suggests that individuals are able to change their location on the shore with spring and neap tides, allowing them to feed on the seaweed left behind.

The species is able to survive rafting on seaweed when it is washed out to sea at high tide. This is thought to be another way for beetles to travel up and down the shore.
