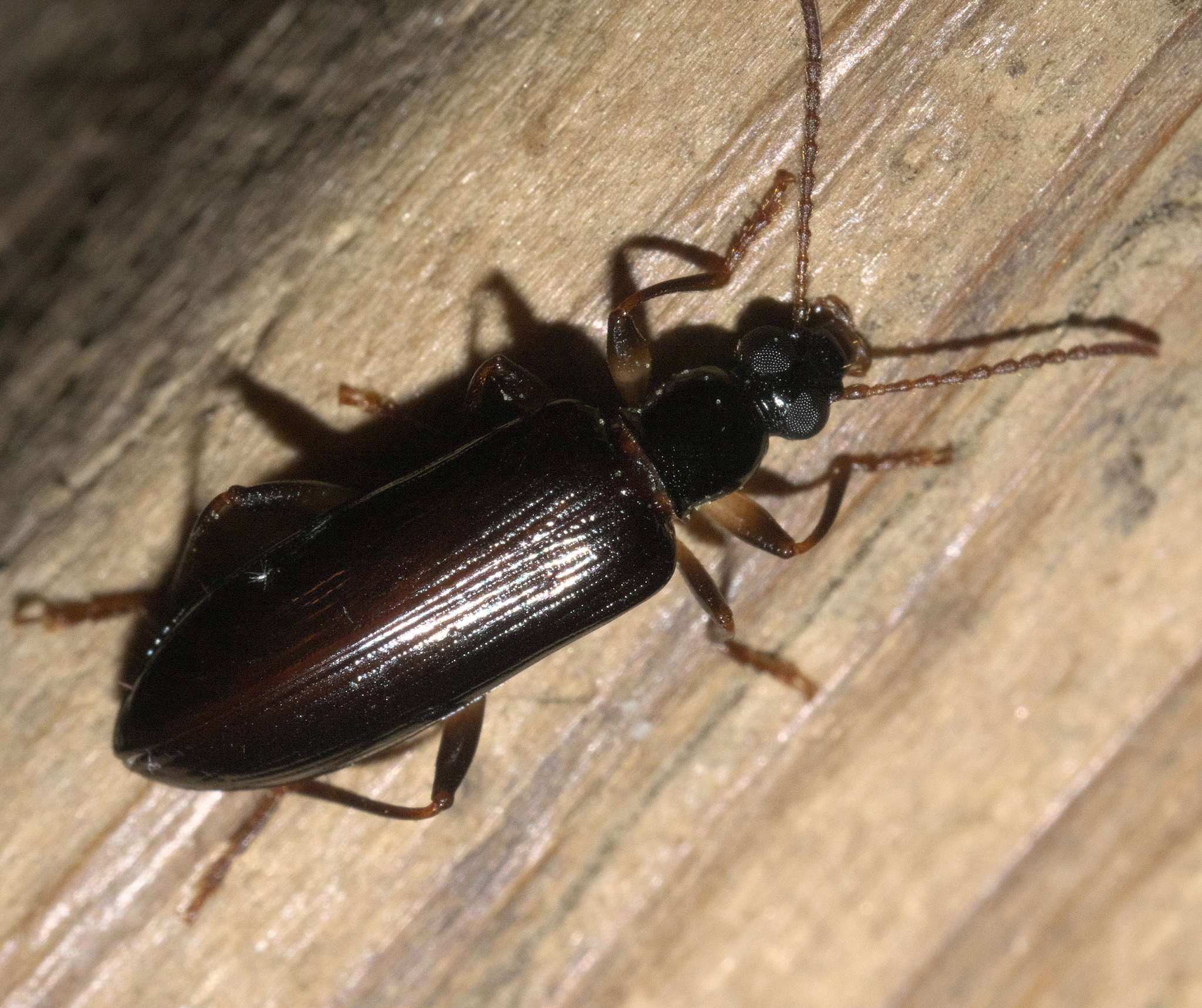
- Statira basalis, Oklahoma

Scientific classification
- Kingdom: Animalia
- Phylum: Arthropoda
- Class: Insecta
- Order: Coleoptera
- Suborder: Polyphaga
- Infraorder: Cucujiformia
- Family: Tenebrionidae
- Genus: Statira
- Species: S. basalis

Binomial name
- Statira basalis Horn, 1888

= Statira basalis =

Species of beetles

Statira basalis is a species of long-jointed beetle in the family Tenebrionidae, found in the United States and Mexico.
