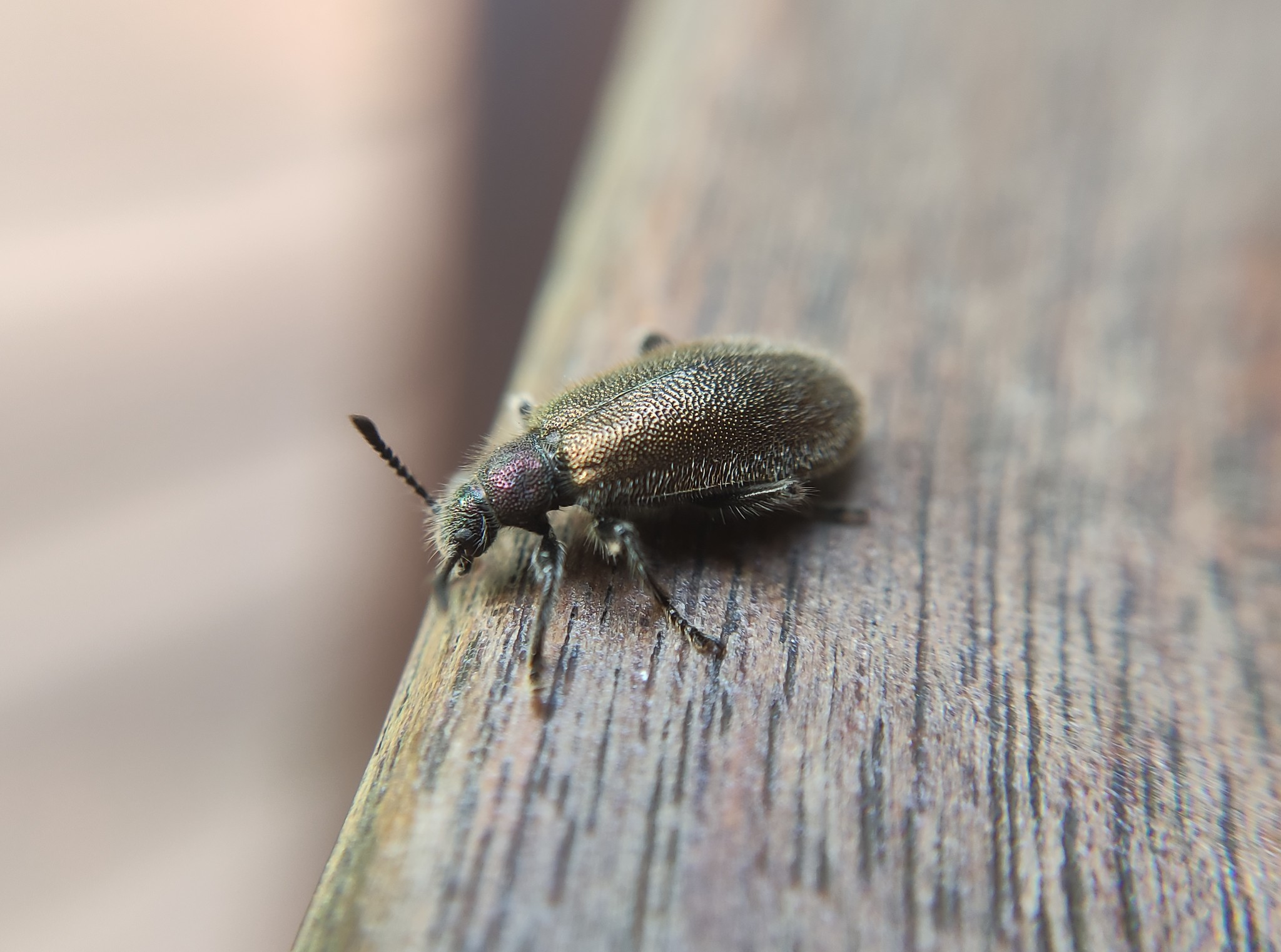

Scientific classification
- Kingdom: Animalia
- Phylum: Arthropoda
- Class: Insecta
- Order: Coleoptera
- Suborder: Polyphaga
- Infraorder: Cucujiformia
- Family: Tenebrionidae
- Genus: Lagria
- Species: L. villosa

Binomial name
- Lagria villosa (Fabricius, 1781)

= Lagria villosa =

Species of beetle

Lagria villosa is a Tenebrionidae beetle of tropical and subtropical African origin which is invasive in South America. The larva as well as the adult feed off a large variety of crops, among them sorghum, ananas, bananas, coffee, potatoes, corn and peach. It also transmits several bacterial pathogens of the genera Fusarium and Pseudomonas, and is considered a significant crop pest.

The first findings outside of Africa were in Brazil (1976), and the insects are now present in large areas of Brazil, Bolivia, Paraguay and northern Argentina. The first recorded specimen in Europe was found in Finland in 2020, in a box of table grapes shipped from Brazil. L. villosa can be easily distinguished from all European Lagria species by two features: In L. villosa, the integuments are dark with purple-green metallic reflections; other European species have brown to black integuments. Also, the L. villosa elytra has copper and golden colors, the European's elytra is pale yellow to black-brown.

The beetles live in symbiosis with a strain of the Burkholderia gladioli bacterium, which produces a polyketide that protects the beetle's eggs against fungal and also bacterial infections. Under controlled laboratory conditions, the symbionts defend the beetle's eggs from fungal infections while present on the egg surface during vertical transmission.The substance, lagriamide, is structurally similar to bistramides like bistramide A, which have similar defensive functions in marine tunicates.

== Literature ==
Azeredo, E. H.; Cassino, P. C. R. (2004). "Bioecologia e efeitos tróficos sobre Lagria villosa (Fabricius, 1783)(Coleoptera: Lagriidae) em áreas de batata, Solanum tuberosum L.". Agronomia (in Portuguese). 38: 52–56.
