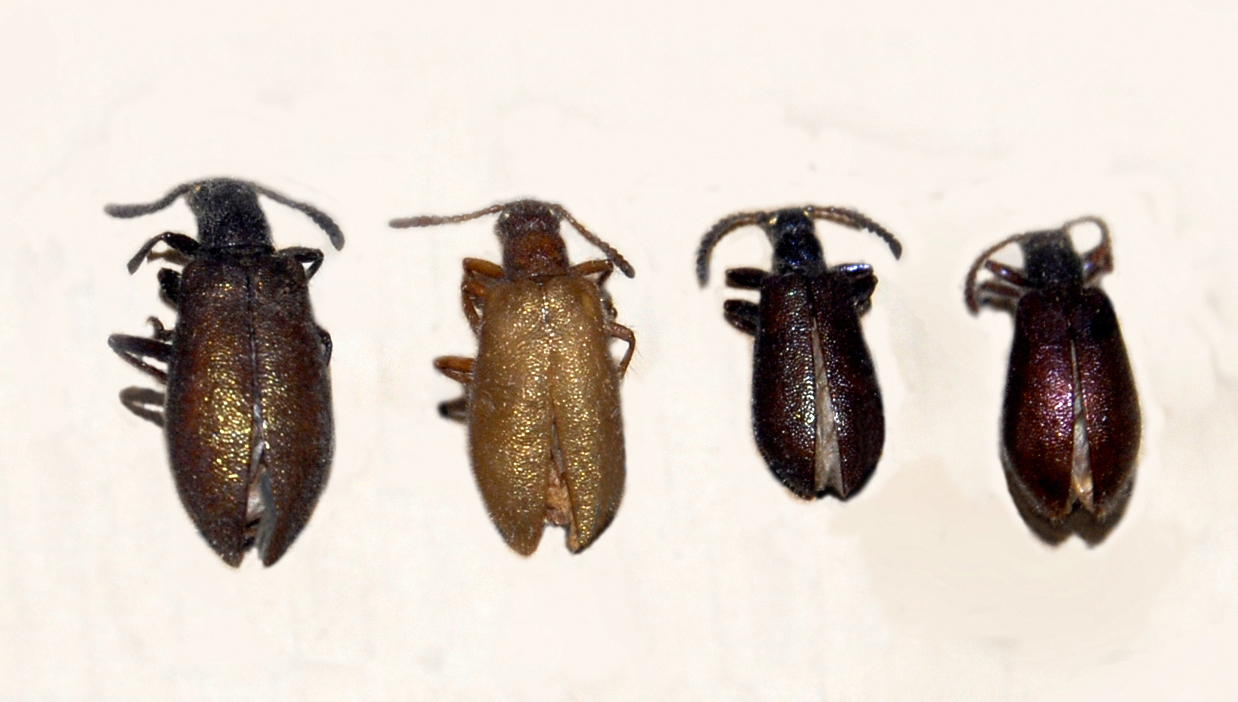
- Lagria cuprina from Uganda. Museum specimen

Scientific classification
- Kingdom: Animalia
- Phylum: Arthropoda
- Clade: Pancrustacea
- Class: Insecta
- Order: Coleoptera
- Suborder: Polyphaga
- Infraorder: Cucujiformia
- Family: Tenebrionidae
- Genus: Lagria
- Species: L. cuprina

Binomial name
- Lagria cuprina Thomson, 1858

= Lagria cuprina =

Species of beetle

Lagria cuprina is a species of beetles in the family Tenebrionidae.

== Description ==
Lagria cuprina can reach a length of about 9 millimetres (0.35 in). Body is oblong, prothorax is almost square, thorax and prothorax are densely punctuated. Elytra are reddish or coppery.

== Distribution ==
This species is present in the tropical Africa.
