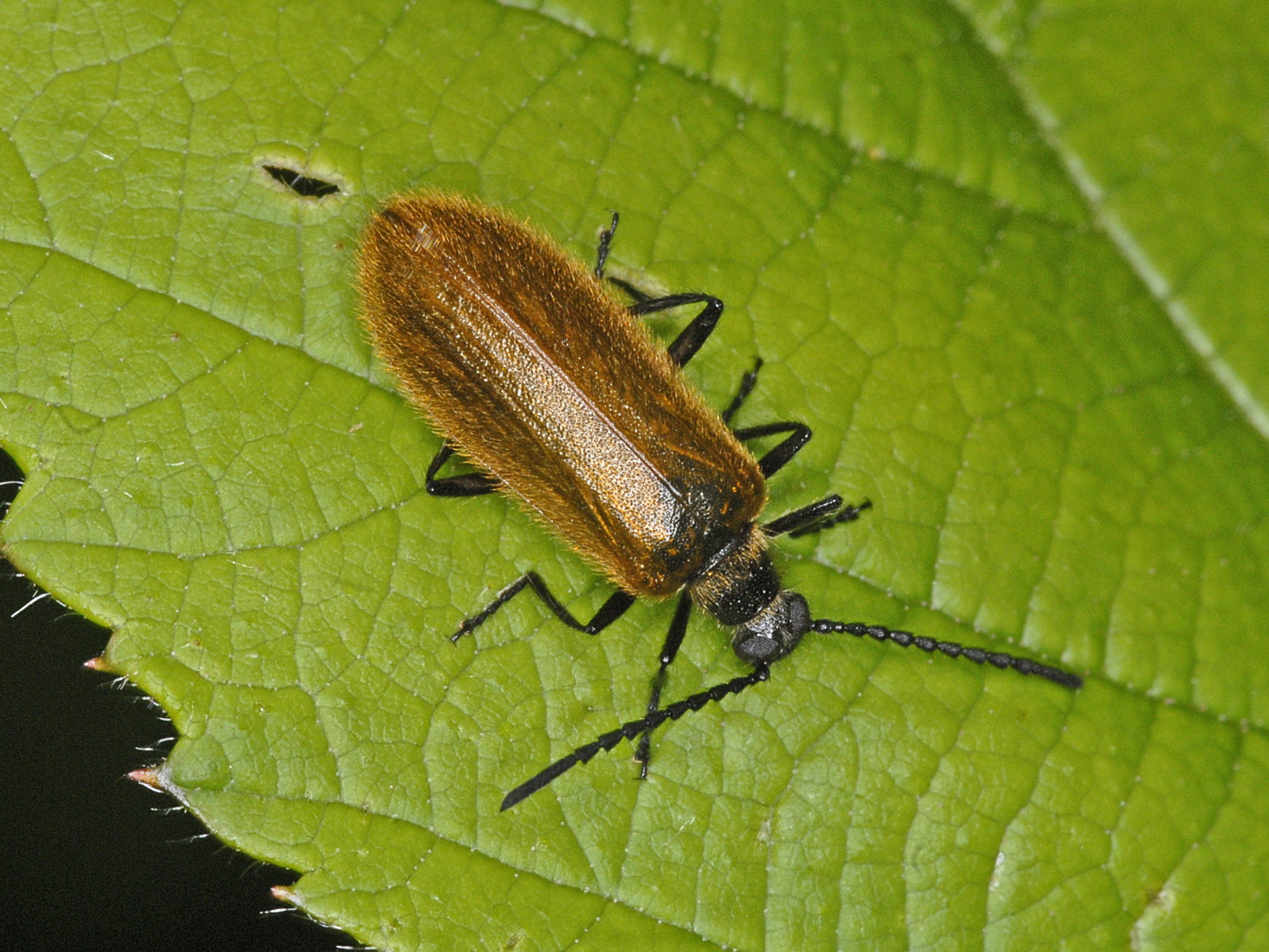
- Lagria hirta, male. Dorsal view
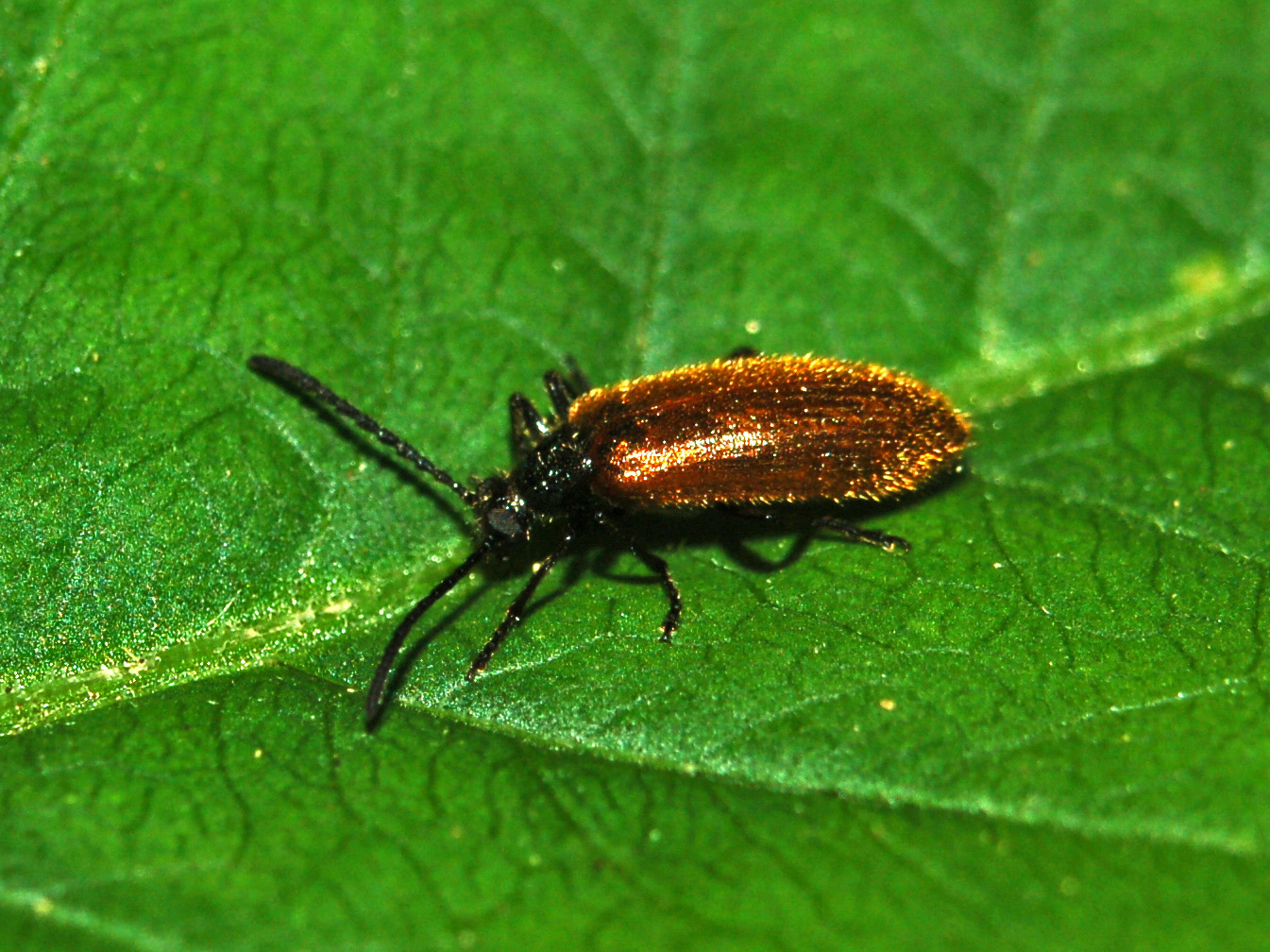
- lateral view

Scientific classification
- Kingdom: Animalia
- Phylum: Arthropoda
- Clade: Pancrustacea
- Class: Insecta
- Order: Coleoptera
- Suborder: Polyphaga
- Infraorder: Cucujiformia
- Family: Tenebrionidae
- Subfamily: Lagriinae
- Genus: Lagria; Fabricius, 1775

= Lagria =

Genus of beetles

Lagria is a genus of beetles in the family Tenebrionidae.

Lagria villosa is a significant pest of crops.

== Species ==
Species recorded in Europe include the following:

- Lagria atripes Mulsant et Guillebeau, 1855
- Lagria glabrata Olivier, 1792
- Lagria grenieri Brisout de Barneville, 1867
- Lagria hirta (Linnaeus, 1758)
- Lagria lata Fabricius, 1801
- Lagria rubida Graells, 1855

Species native to Africa include:

- Lagria cuprina Thomson, 1858
- Lagria villosa (Fabricius, 1781) – invasive in South America
