= Cossyphus =

- Cossyphus depressus

Scientific classification
- Kingdom: Animalia
- Phylum: Arthropoda
- Clade: Pancrustacea
- Class: Insecta
- Order: Coleoptera
- Suborder: Polyphaga
- Infraorder: Cucujiformia
- Family: Tenebrionidae
- Subfamily: Lagriinae
- Genus: Cossyphus; Olivier, 1791

Genus of beetles

Cossyphus is a genus of darkling beetles in the family Tenebrionidae. They occur in Asia and Africa. commonly referred to as "UFO darkling beetles".

These beetles are characterized by a flattened, shield like translucent body and are found frequently in South Asia, Southeast Asia, and parts of Africa.

Similarly to many Tenebrionid beetles, Cossyphus sp. are usually found in leaf litter and under debris like wood bark, being detritivores that feed on dead and decaying organic matter.

== Species ==
There are about 33 species and subspecies. Species recorded include the following:

- Cossyphus algiricus
- Cossyphus dejeani
- Cossyphus hoffmannseggi
- Cossyphus laevis
- Cossyphus minutissimus
- Cossyphus moniliatus
- Cossyphus moniliferus
- Cossyphus rugosulus
- Cossyphus tauricus
- Cossyphus depressus
