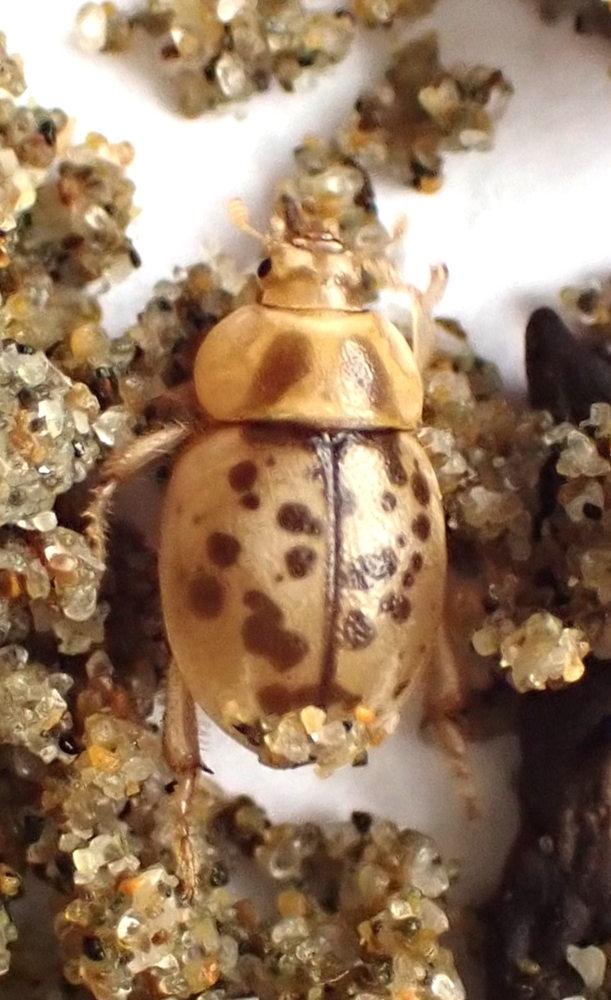
- Chaerodes trachyscelides

Scientific classification
- Kingdom: Animalia
- Phylum: Arthropoda
- Class: Insecta
- Order: Coleoptera
- Suborder: Polyphaga
- Infraorder: Cucujiformia
- Family: Tenebrionidae
- Subfamily: Lagriinae
- Genus: Chaerodes; White, 1846

= Chaerodes =

Genus of beetles

Chaerodes is a genus of darkling beetle endemic to New Zealand. There are currently two accepted species.

Species:

- Chaerodes laetus Broun, 1880
- Chaerodes trachyscelides White, 1846
