= Euclarkia =

Scientific classification
- Domain: Eukaryota
- Kingdom: Animalia
- Phylum: Arthropoda
- Class: Insecta
- Order: Coleoptera
- Suborder: Polyphaga
- Infraorder: Cucujiformia
- Family: Tenebrionidae
- Tribe: Belopini
- Genus: Euclarkia; Lea, 1919
- Species: E. costata

Binomial name
- Euclarkia costata Lea, 1919

Genus of beetles

Euclarkia is a genus of long-jointed beetles in the family Tenebrionidae. There is one described species in Euclarkia, E. costata, found in Australia.
