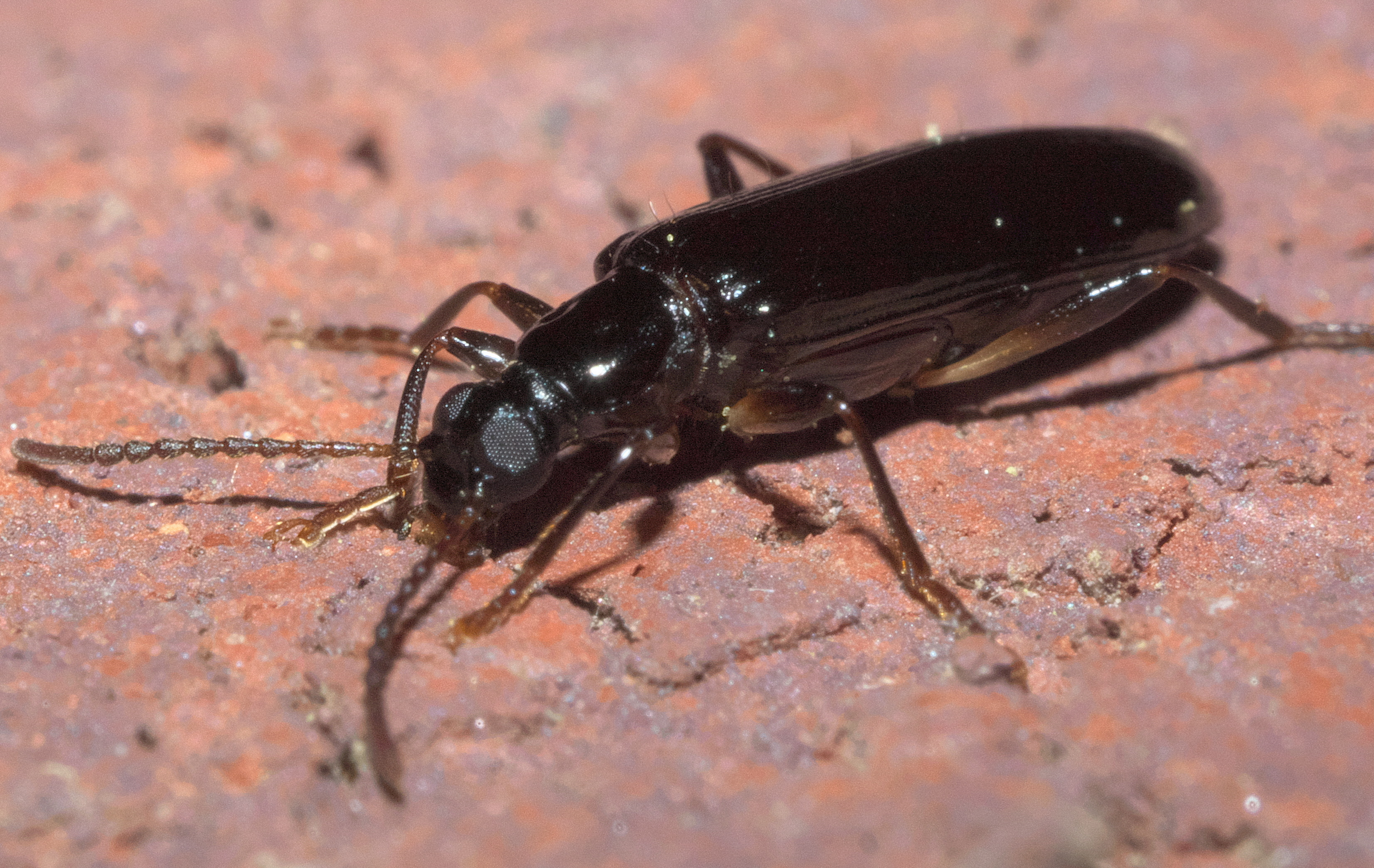

Scientific classification
- Kingdom: Animalia
- Phylum: Arthropoda
- Clade: Pancrustacea
- Class: Insecta
- Order: Coleoptera
- Suborder: Polyphaga
- Infraorder: Cucujiformia
- Family: Tenebrionidae
- Subfamily: Lagriinae
- Tribe: Lagriini
- Subtribe: Statirina
- Genus: Statira; Lepeletier & Audinet-Serville, 1828

Subgenera
- Foveostatira Pic, 1918; Pleurostira Borchmann, 1921; Spinostatira Pic, 1918; Statira Lepeletier & Audinet-Serville, 1828; Xenostira Borchmann, 1921

Synonyms
- Foveostatira Pic, 1918; Hoplostatira Borchmann, 1921; Hoplostira Borchmann, 1921; Pleurostira Borchmann, 1921; Spinostatira Pic, 1918; Statira Berthold, 1827; Statyra Lacordaire, 1830; Xenostira Borchmann, 1921

= Statira (beetle) =

Genus of beetles

Statira is a genus of long-jointed beetles in the family Tenebrionidae, mostly found in the Americas. There are more than 190 described species in the genus Statira.

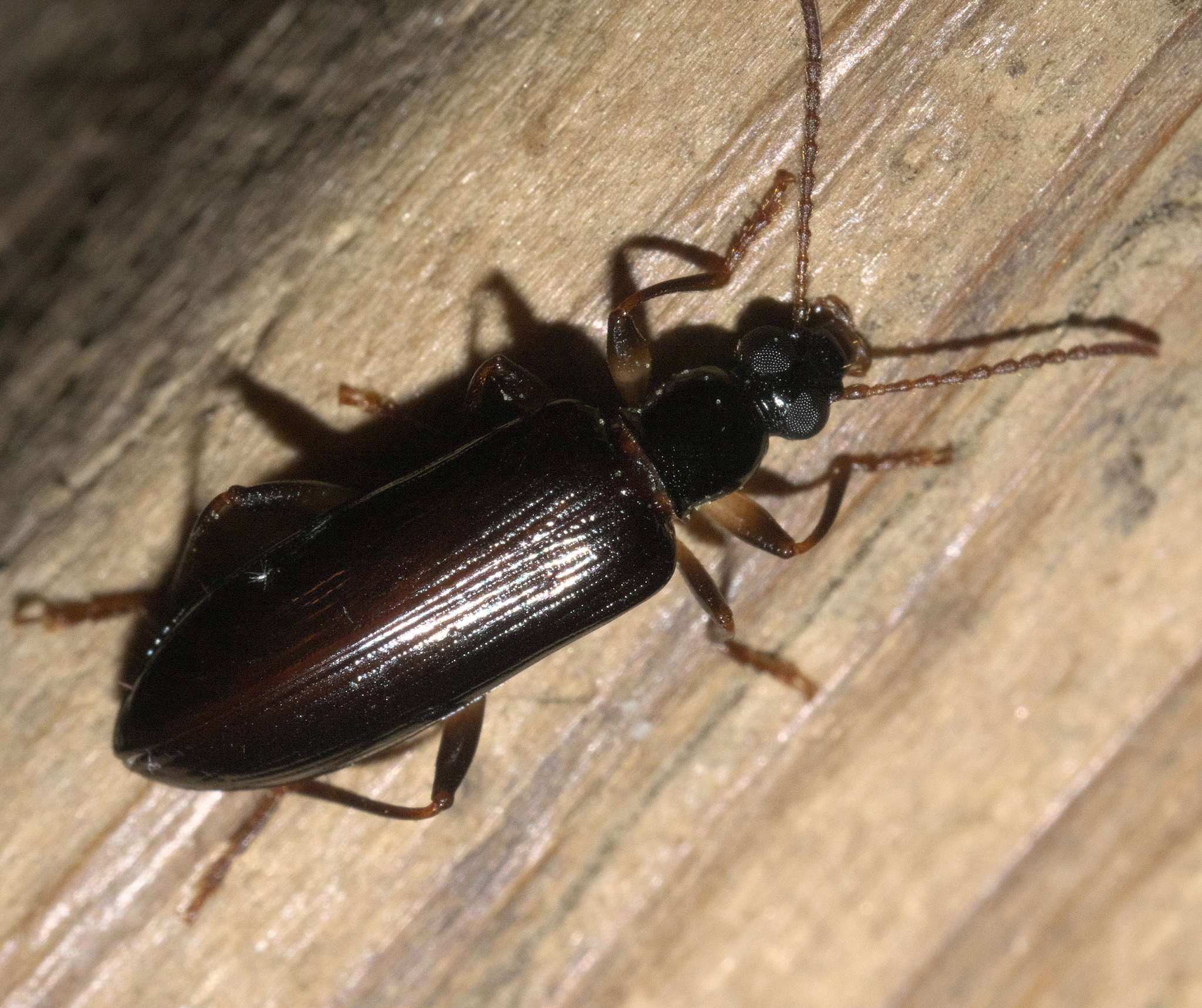
Statira basalis, Oklahoma

== Species ==
These 192 species belong to the genus Statira:

- Statira acanthomera Champion, 1917
- Statira aeneipennis Champion, 1889
- Statira aeneotincta Champion, 1889
- Statira aerata Champion, 1889
- Statira agraeformis Champion, 1889
- Statira agroides Lepeletier & Serville, 1828
- Statira alberti Pic, 1918
- Statira albofasciata Champion, 1889
- Statira alexandri Pic, 1918
- Statira allenbyi Pic, 1918
- Statira alternans Champion, 1889
- Statira amicta Borchmann, 1936
- Statira analis Borchmann, 1921
- Statira angustula Champion, 1889
- Statira antennalis Borchmann, 1936
- Statira asperata Champion, 1889
- Statira baltica Telnov, Bukejs & Merkl, 2019
- Statira basalis Horn
- Statira bicolor Champion, 1889
- Statira biseriata Borchmann, 1921
- Statira bogotensis Pic, 1917
- Statira borchmanni Nevermann, 1926
- Statira brevicollis Mäklin, 1879
- Statira brevipilis Champion, 1889
- Statira brunneiceps Pic, 1912
- Statira caeruleipennis Champion, 1889
- Statira caeruleotincta Champion, 1917
- Statira caliensis Champion, 1917
- Statira castelnaui Pic, 1918
- Statira cavernosa Champion, 1917
- Statira cayennensis Champion, 1917
- Statira chalcoptera Champion, 1917
- Statira ciliata Champion, 1889
- Statira collaris Champion, 1889
- Statira colorata Fall, 1909
- Statira conspicillata
- Statira corrosa Champion, 1889
- Statira costaricensis Champion, 1889
- Statira cribrata Champion, 1889
- Statira cribripennis Mäklin, 1879
- Statira croceicollis Maeklin
- Statira cruciata Champion, 1917
- Statira cupreotincta Champion, 1889
- Statira cupripennis Mäklin, 1879
- Statira curticollis Champion, 1889
- Statira cyanella Borchmann, 1921
- Statira cyanipennis Mäklin, 1878
- Statira cylindricollis Mäklin, 1878
- Statira defecta Schaeffer, 1905
- Statira dejeani Champion, 1917
- Statira dermoidea Doyen & Poinar, 1994
- Statira diazi Pic, 1918
- Statira dolera Parsons, 1966
- Statira dumalis Parsons, 1973
- Statira erina Parsons, 1975
- Statira eumera Borchmann, 1921
- Statira evanescens
- Statira exigua Mäklin, 1879
- Statira femoralis (Borchmann, 1921)
- Statira ferruginea Mäklin, 1879
- Statira flohri Champion, 1893
- Statira fochi Pic, 1918
- Statira foveicollis Champion, 1889
- Statira foveolata Borchmann, 1921
- Statira francheti Pic, 1918
- Statira fulva Fleutiaux & Sallé, 1890
- Statira fulvescens Borchmann, 1936
- Statira fusca Mäklin, 1879
- Statira gagatina Melsheimer, 1845
- Statira glabricollis Borchmann, 1936
- Statira gratiosa Mäklin, 1879
- Statira guatemalensis Champion, 1889
- Statira guttata Borchmann, 1921
- Statira haitiensis Champion, 1917
- Statira heliconiae Borchmann, 1936
- Statira heliophila Borchmann, 1936
- Statira hilaris Mäklin, 1879
- Statira hirsuta Champion, 1889
- Statira hirta Borchmann, 1921
- Statira horrida Champion, 1889
- Statira huachucae Schaeffer, 1905
- Statira ignita Champion, 1889
- Statira impressa Borchmann, 1921
- Statira impressipennis Mäklin, 1879
- Statira inaequicollis Borchmann, 1936
- Statira inconstans Champion, 1889
- Statira ingae Borchmann, 1936
- Statira ingens Champion, 1889
- Statira interruptecostata Pic, 1914
- Statira irazuensis Champion, 1889
- Statira irregularis Champion, 1889
- Statira isthmiaca Champion, 1889
- Statira joffrei Pic, 1918
- Statira laeta Borchmann, 1921
- Statira laevicollis Champion, 1889
- Statira laevigata Mäklin, 1879
- Statira lateralis Mäklin, 1879
- Statira latitator Parsons, 1973
- Statira leptotracheloides Champion, 1889
- Statira liebecki Leng, 1923
- Statira limbata Champion, 1889
- Statira limonis Borchmann, 1936
- Statira literata Mäklin, 1879
- Statira lloydi Pic, 1918
- Statira maklini Kirsch, 1866
- Statira marmorata Champion, 1889
- Statira medialis Mäklin, 1879
- Statira mediosignata Borchmann, 1921
- Statira metallica Champion, 1889
- Statira mexicana Champion, 1889
- Statira microps Champion, 1889
- Statira minima
- Statira multiformis Champion, 1889
- Statira multipunctata Champion, 1889
- Statira nevermanni Borchmann, 1936
- Statira nigella Mäklin, 1879
- Statira nigripennis
- Statira nigroaenea Champion, 1889
- Statira nigrofasciata Borchmann, 1921
- Statira nigromaculata Champion, 1889
- Statira nodulosa Champion, 1889
- Statira nubeculosa Mäklin, 1879
- Statira opaca Borchmann, 1936
- Statira opacicollis Horn, 1888
- Statira paradoxa Borchmann, 1936
- Statira patricia Borchmann, 1921
- Statira paucula Borchmann, 1921
- Statira penicillata Champion, 1889
- Statira perforata Champion, 1917
- Statira pershingi Pic, 1918
- Statira petaini Pic, 1918
- Statira pici Blackwelder, 1945
- Statira picipennis Mäklin, 1879
- Statira picta Champion, 1889
- Statira pilifera Champion, 1893
- Statira pilipes Champion, 1889
- Statira pluripunctata Horn, 1888
- Statira pueblensis Champion, 1889
- Statira pulchella
- Statira punctatissima Champion, 1889
- Statira punctipennis Champion, 1889
- Statira quadrimaculata Mäklin, 1879
- Statira reticulaticollis Borchmann, 1936
- Statira robusta Schaeffer, 1905
- Statira rotundicollis Champion, 1917
- Statira rugicollis Champion, 1889
- Statira rugipes Champion, 1889
- Statira scalpta Borchmann, 1921
- Statira scapularis Borchmann, 1921
- Statira schmidti Borchmann, 1936
- Statira scitula Champion, 1889
- Statira sculpturata Borchmann, 1936
- Statira scutellaris Pic, 1912
- Statira semilineata Pic, 1917
- Statira seriepunctata Borchmann, 1921
- Statira setigera Champion, 1889
- Statira sexmaculata Mäklin, 1879
- Statira simplex Borchmann, 1936
- Statira simulans Schaeffer, 1905
- Statira sobrina Champion, 1889
- Statira sordida Mäklin, 1879
- Statira spiculifera Champion, 1893
- Statira steinheili Mäklin, 1879
- Statira suavis Champion, 1889
- Statira submetallica Borchmann, 1921
- Statira subnitida LeConte, 1866
- Statira sumtuosa Mäklin, 1879
- Statira superba Pic, 1918
- Statira terminalis Mäklin, 1879
- Statira testacea Champion, 1889
- Statira tolensis Champion, 1889
- Statira triangulifer Champion, 1889
- Statira trifasciata Mäklin, 1879
- Statira trilineata Mäklin, 1879
- Statira trisellata Champion, 1917
- Statira tropicalis Champion, 1889
- Statira tuberculifera Champion, 1889
- Statira tuberosa Champion, 1889
- Statira unicolor
- Statira validicornis Mäklin, 1879
- Statira variabilis
- Statira venizelosi Pic, 1918
- Statira veraecrucis Champion, 1889
- Statira veraepacis Champion, 1889
- Statira villosa Champion, 1889
- Statira virescens Mäklin, 1879
- Statira viridicollis Champion, 1889
- Statira viridinitens Champion, 1917
- Statira viridipennis Lepeletier & Serville, 1828
- Statira vittata Champion, 1896
- Statira wilsoni Pic, 1918
- Statira zonata Borchmann, 1921
