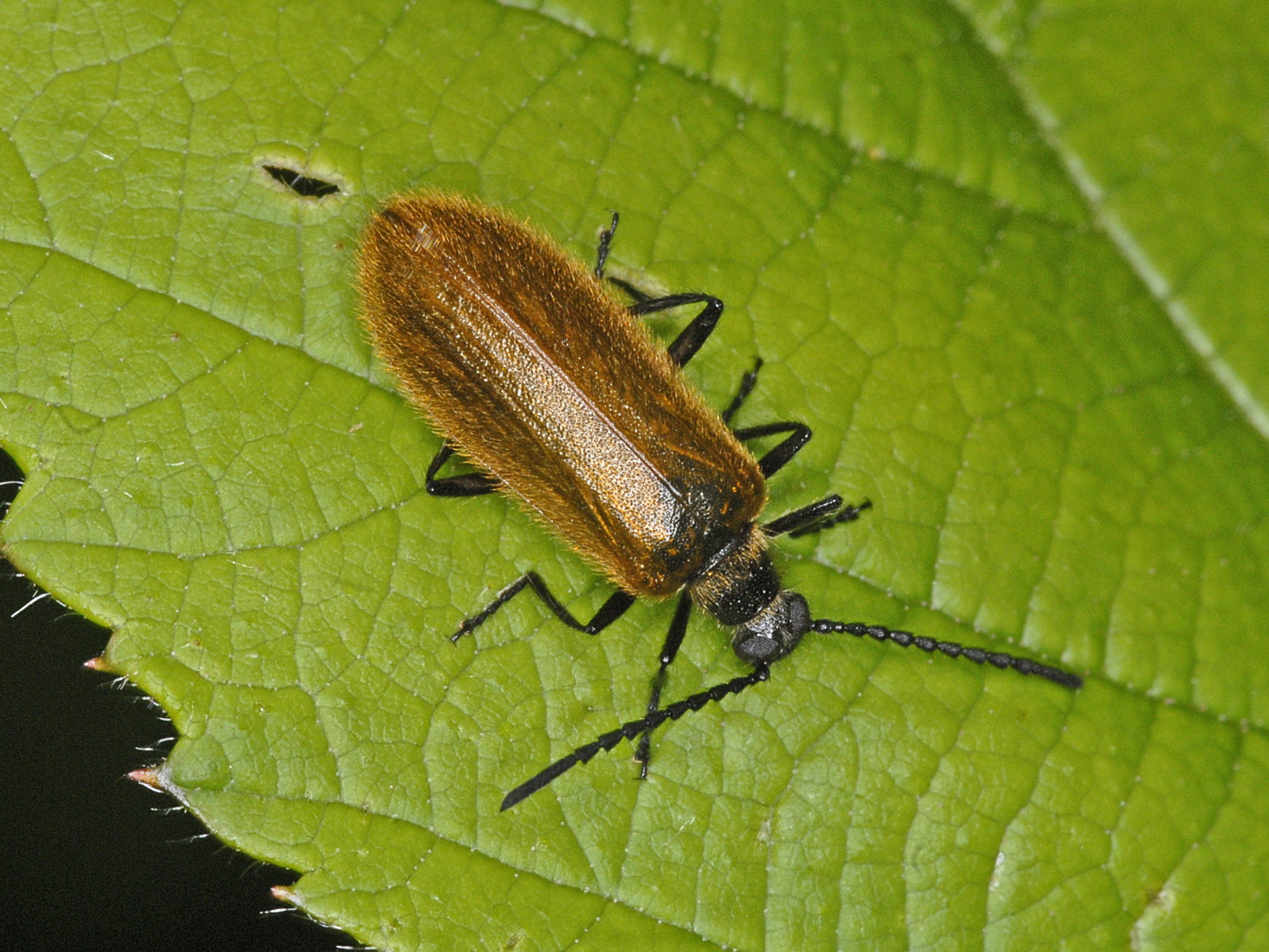
- Lagria hirta, male. Dorsal view
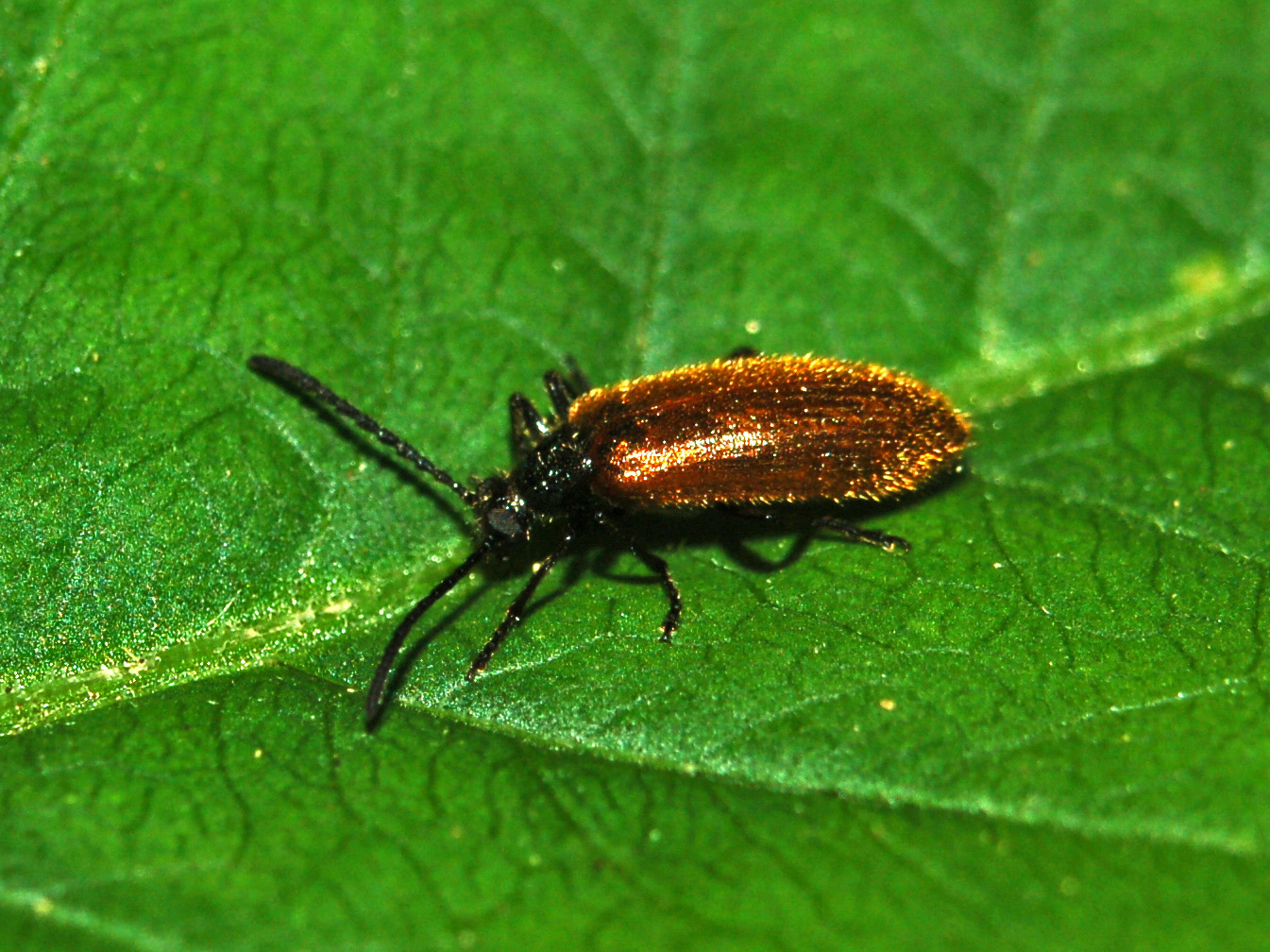
- lateral view

Scientific classification
- Kingdom: Animalia
- Phylum: Arthropoda
- Clade: Pancrustacea
- Class: Insecta
- Order: Coleoptera
- Suborder: Polyphaga
- Infraorder: Cucujiformia
- Family: Tenebrionidae
- Genus: Lagria
- Species: L. hirta

Binomial name
- Lagria hirta (Linnaeus, 1758)

Synonyms
- List: Cantharis spadicea Scopoli, 1763; Chrysomela pubescens Linnaeus, 1767; Lagria glabrata Fabricius, 1775; Tenebrio villosus De Geer, 1775; Cantharis flava Geoffroy, 1785; Lagria lurida Krynicki, 1832; Lagria nudipennis Mulsant, 1856; Lagria depilis Mulsant, 1856; Lagria caucasica Motschulsky, 1860; Lagria fuscata Motschulsky, 1860; Lagria pontica Motschulsky, 1860; Lagria hirta limbata Desbrochers des Loges, 1881; Lagria seminuda Reitter, 1889

= Lagria hirta =

Species of beetle

Lagria hirta is a species of beetle in the family Tenebrionidae.

== Etymology ==
The species name hirta comes from the Latin hirtus meaning rough hair or rough wool, referring to the coarse, fuzzy appearance of the beetle.

== Distribution ==
This species is present in Europe, in North Africa (Algeria, Morocco), in Russia (Western and Eastern Siberia), in Israel, Turkey, Iran, Iraq, Paraguay, Kazakhstan, Turkmenistan, Uzbekistan and Tajikistan.

== Habitat ==
L. hirta prefers areas with sandy soils. It can be found in open woods, deciduous forests, forest clearings, forest edges, grasslands, and wet meadows, but also in dry valleys and wet areas.

== Description ==
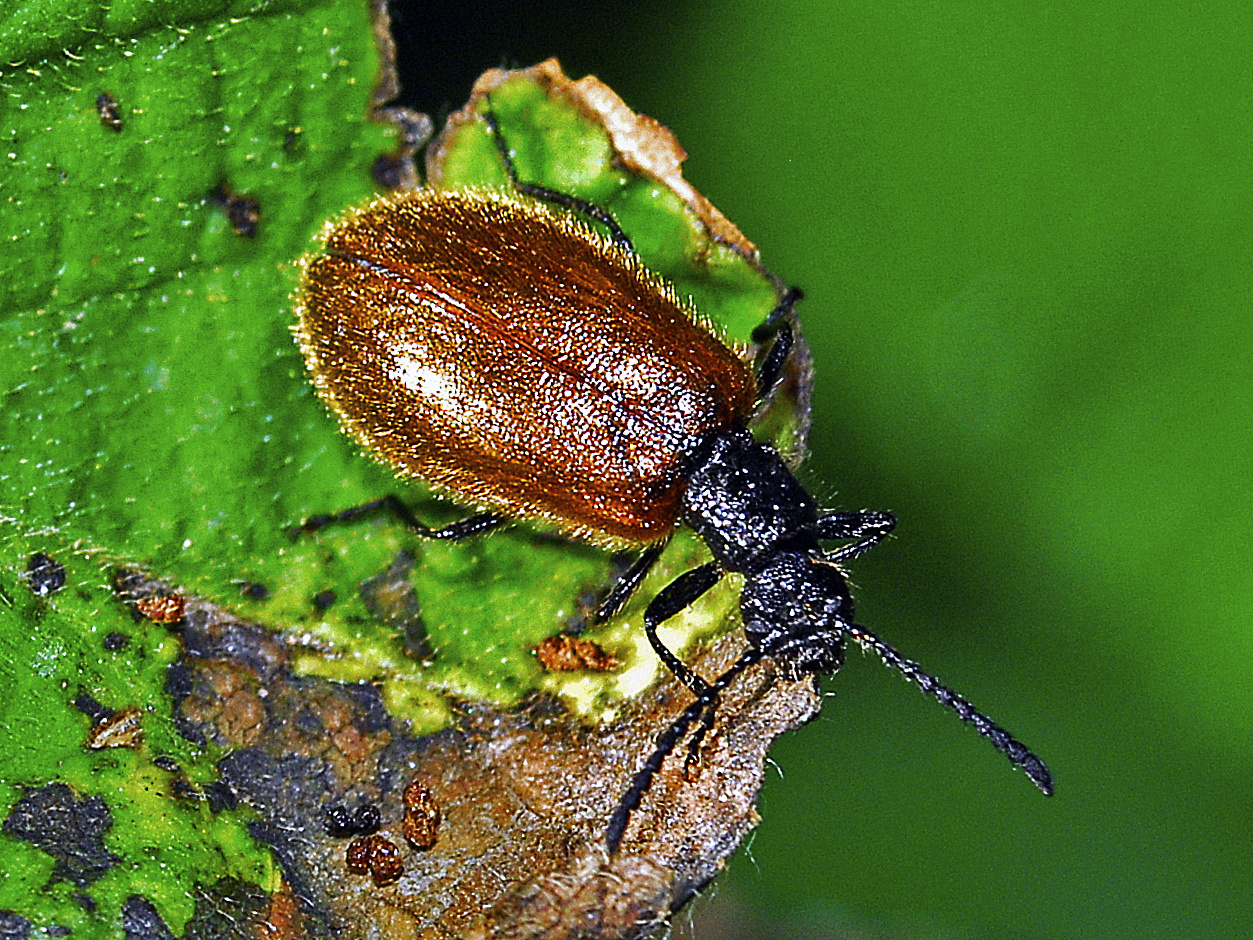
Lagria hirta, female

Lagria hirta can reach a length of 7–8 millimetres (0.28–0.31 in). They have a soft and elongated body, which can be brown to black in colour, large and round eyes, and black antennae and legs. Antennae are composed of eleven segments. The relatively elongated elytra are yellowish-brown and covered by dense fine hairs. The rest of the body is also hairy, but they are less clearly visible.

The females have a wider abdomen and longer elytra. The males, in addition to their slimmer body, are distinguished from the females by their larger eyes and by the length of the last segment of the antennae, which is nearly twice the corresponding segment in the female. The hind wings are transparent.

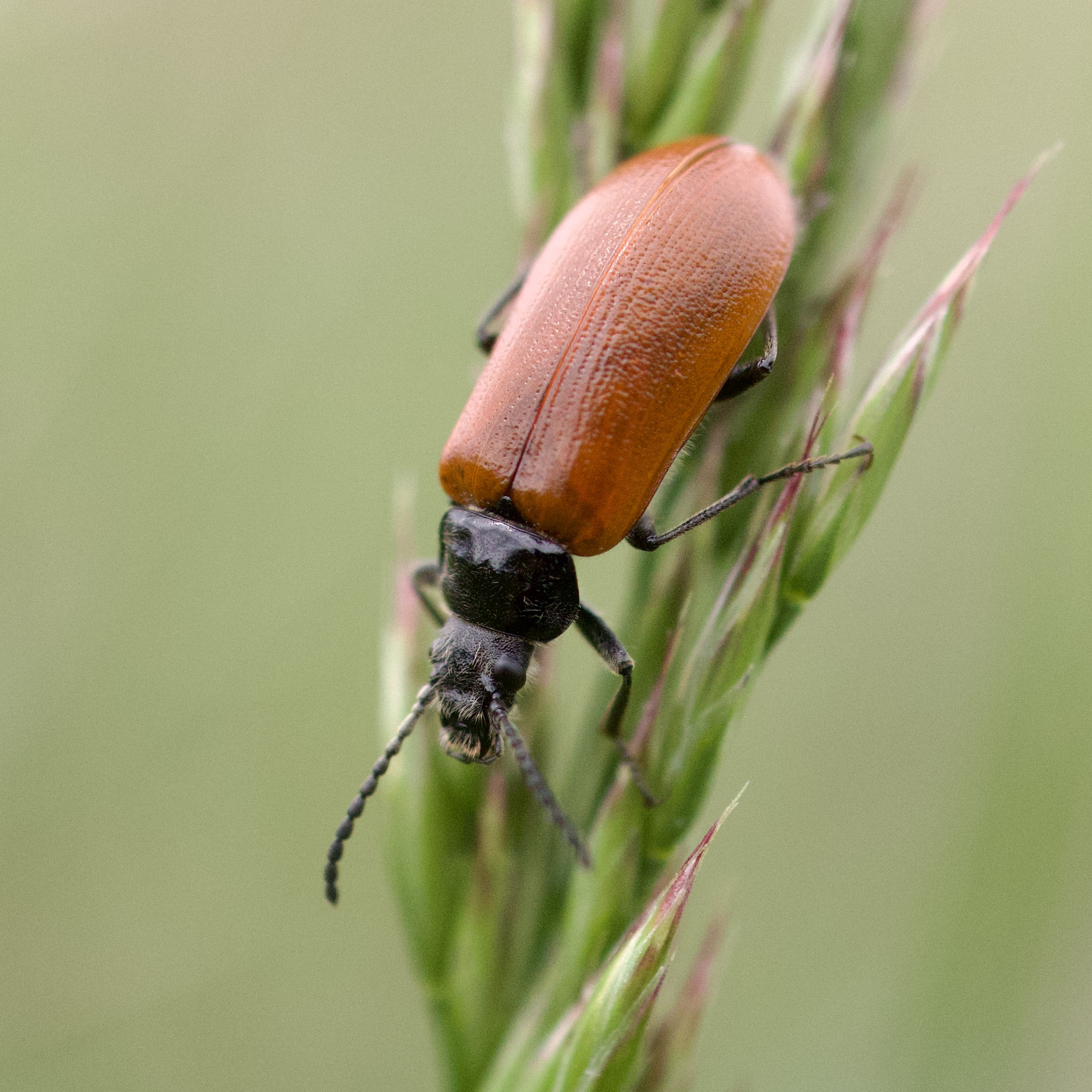
Lagria hirta (Lot, France)

== Biology ==
The fully formed beetles can be seen from late May to September. The adult beetles feed on nectar and pollen. Females lay eggs in the soil, where they hatch after about eight days. The larvae live in the humus where they feed on decaying vegetables. After having overwintered, larvae pupate in early summer of the next year and a new generation of beetles will then develop.

== Bibliography ==
- Michael Chinery, Insectes de France et d'Europe occidentale, Paris, Flammarion, 2012, 320 p. (ISBN 978-2-0812-8823-2), p. 276
- Vladimir Novák: Beetles of the family Tenebrionidae of Central Europe. Praga: Academia, 2014, s. 203–235, Zoological Keys
