= Kershawia =

Scientific classification
- Kingdom: Animalia
- Phylum: Arthropoda
- Clade: Pancrustacea
- Class: Insecta
- Order: Coleoptera
- Suborder: Polyphaga
- Infraorder: Cucujiformia
- Family: Tenebrionidae
- Tribe: Belopini
- Genus: Kershawia; Lea, 1905
- Species: K. rugiceps

Binomial name
- Kershawia rugiceps Lea, 1905

Species of beetle

Kershawia is a genus of long-jointed beetles in the family Tenebrionidae. There is one described species in Kershawia, K. rugiceps, found in Australia.
