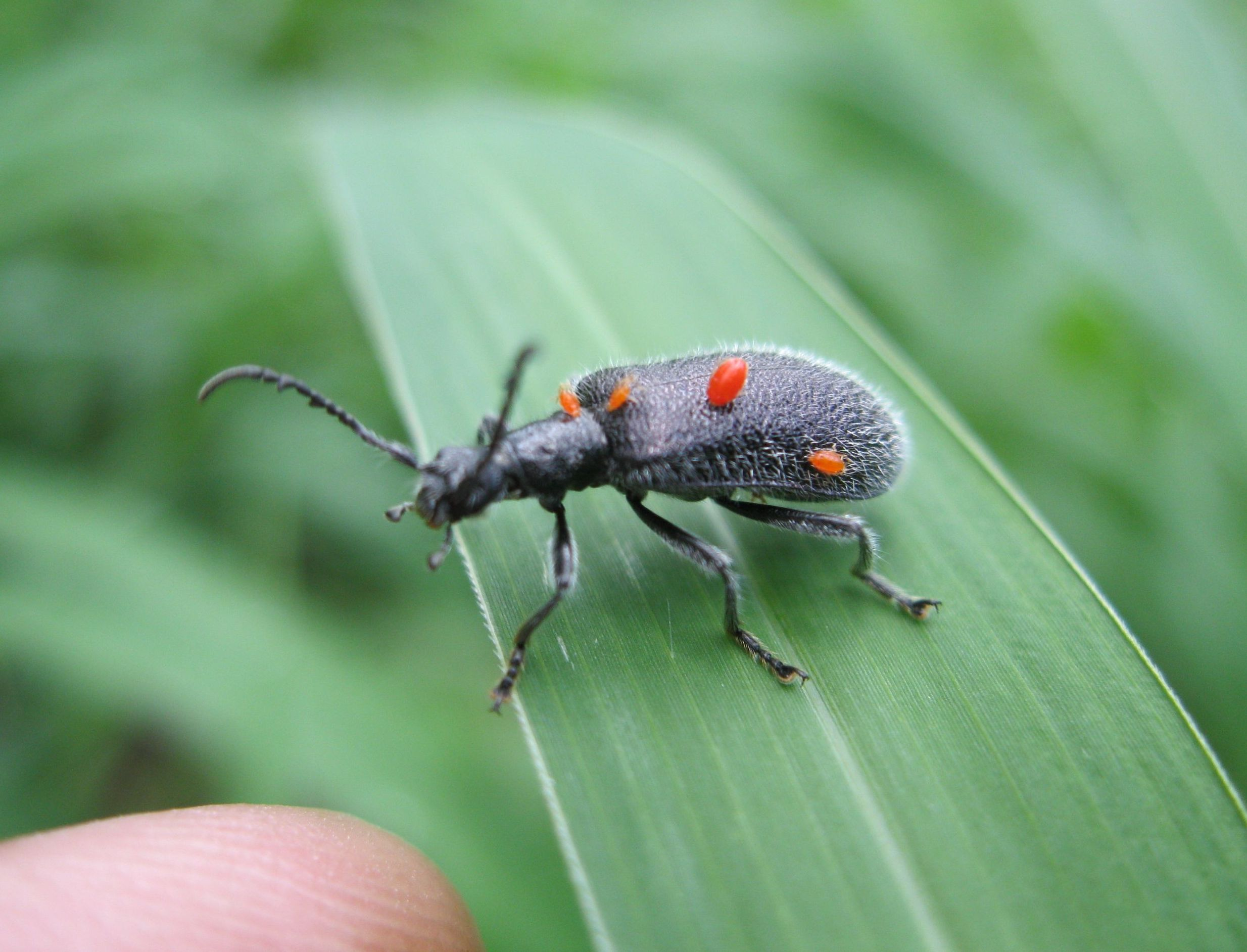
- Cerogria sp.

Scientific classification
- Kingdom: Animalia
- Phylum: Arthropoda
- Clade: Pancrustacea
- Class: Insecta
- Order: Coleoptera
- Suborder: Polyphaga
- Infraorder: Cucujiformia
- Family: Tenebrionidae
- Subfamily: Lagriinae
- Genus: Cerogria; F. Borchmann, 1911

= Cerogria =

Genus of beetles

Cerogria is a genus of beetles belonging to the family Tenebrionidae.
