= Hans Gebien =

German entomologist

Hans Gebien 4 October 1874, Horn, Hamburg- 9 October 1947, Großhansdorf) was a German entomologist who specialised in Tenebrionidae (Coleoptera). His collections are in Biozentrum Grindel und Zoologisches Museum, Hamburg, the Natural History Museum of Basel, and in Museo Civico di Storia Naturale di Milano (both ex Museum G. Frey Tutzing).

== Works ==
- Gebien, H. 1910–11: Tenebrionidae 1–4. Trictenotomidae. Coleopterorum catalogus 22. 169–354; 28: 355–585.
- Gebien, H. 1925: Die Tenebrioniden (Coleoptera) des IndoMalayischen Gebietes. Philippine journal of science 28: 101–128.
- Gebien, H. 1938–42: Katalog der Tenebrioniden, Teil II. Mitteilungen der münchener entomologischer Gesellschaft 28: 49–80, 283–314, 397–428; 29: 443–474; 30: 405–436; 32: 729–760.
