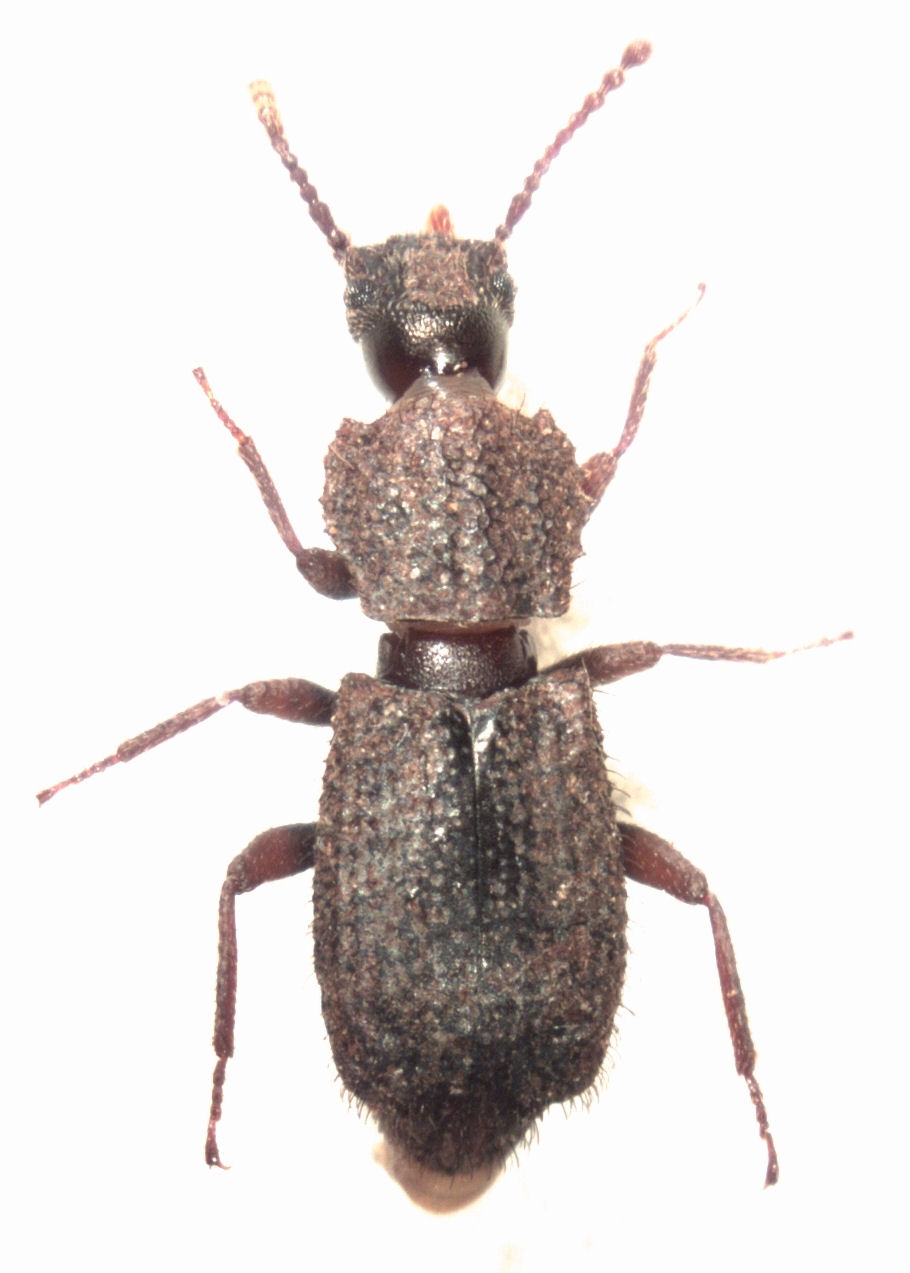
- Wattadelium sp.

Scientific classification
- Kingdom: Animalia
- Phylum: Arthropoda
- Class: Insecta
- Order: Coleoptera
- Suborder: Polyphaga
- Infraorder: Cucujiformia
- Family: Tenebrionidae
- Subfamily: Lagriinae
- Tribe: Adeliini; Kirby, 1828

= Adeliini (beetle) =

Tribe of beetles

Adeliini is a tribe of beetles in the subfamily Lagriinae, family Tenebrionidae. The same name has been used for a tribe of wasps, but Adeliini Kirby, 1828 has priority.
