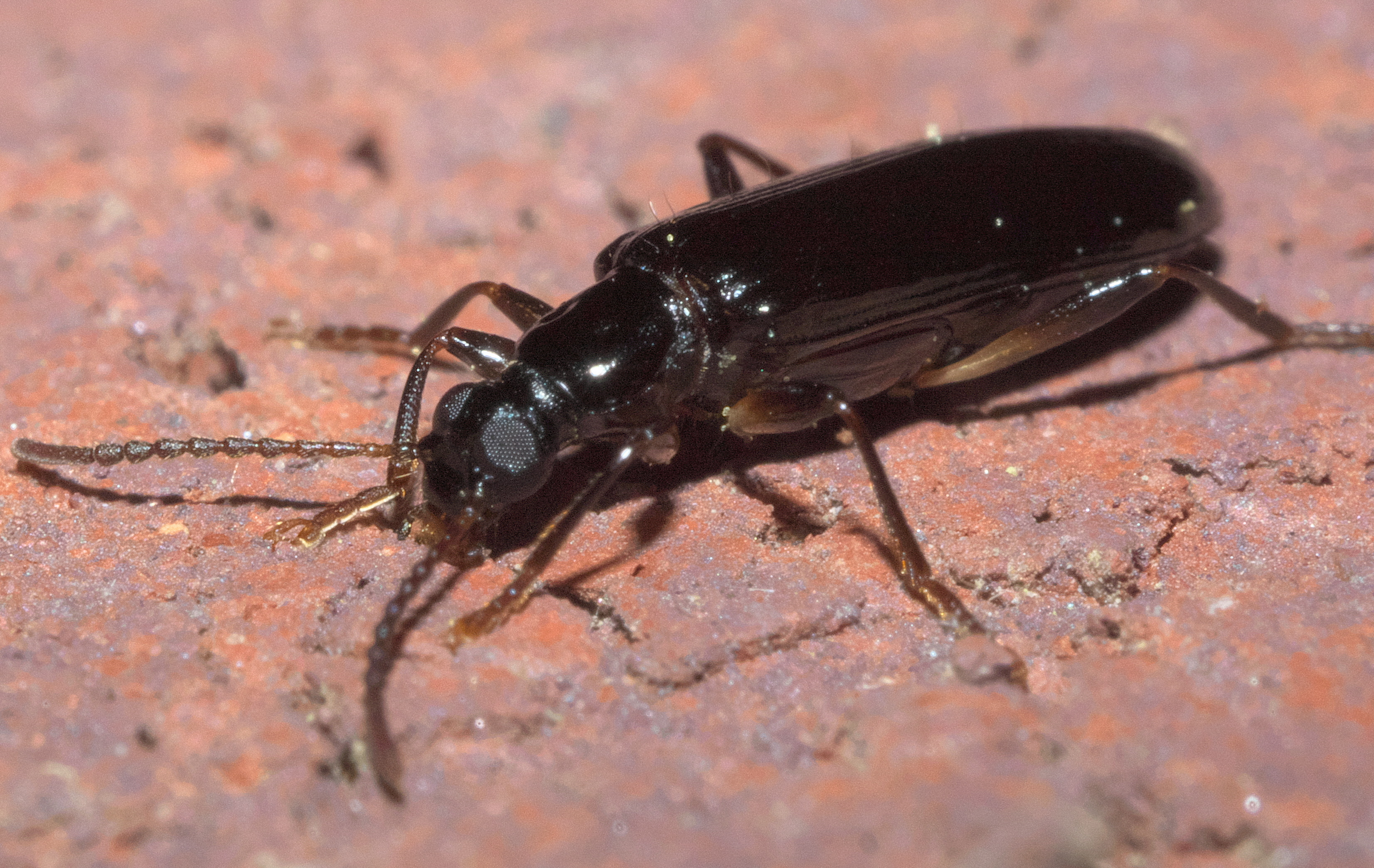
- Statira

Scientific classification
- Kingdom: Animalia
- Phylum: Arthropoda
- Clade: Pancrustacea
- Class: Insecta
- Order: Coleoptera
- Suborder: Polyphaga
- Infraorder: Cucujiformia
- Family: Tenebrionidae
- Subfamily: Lagriinae; Latreille, 1825

Tribes
- Adeliini W. Kirby, 1828; Belopini Reitter, 1917; Chaerodini Doyen, Matthews & Lawrence, 1990; Cossyphini Latreille, 1802; Eschatoporiini Blaisdell, 1906; Goniaderini Lacordaire, 1859; Laenini Seidlitz, 1895; Lagriini Latreille, 1825 (1820); Lupropini Lesne, 1926; Pycnocerini Lacordaire, 1859; † Gonialaenini Nabozhenko, Bukejs & Telnov, 2019

Diversity
- at least 270 genera

Synonyms
- Lagriidae

= Lagriinae =

Subfamily of beetles

Lagriinae is a subfamily of long-jointed beetles in the family Tenebrionidae. There are more than 270 genera in Lagriinae, grouped into 11 tribes.

== Description ==
Adults of Lagriinae are mostly medium-sized (5-12 mm) and exhibit typical Tenebrionidae characteristics, including a 5-5-4 tarsal formula and the antennal bases concealed by canthi. The eyes are usually deeply emarginate and in many species partially surround the antennal bases. The last antennal segment is either the longest or the widest segment, and is often sexually dimorphic. The head tends to be at least as broad as the pronotum and is often constricted behind the level of the eyes. The pronotum tends to be much narrower than the base of the elytra. Additionally, the pronotum is generally broadest at its base, and its sides are sinuate or otherwise constricted.

Some species resemble members of other families, like Arthromacra resembling Oedemeridae, Rhypasma resembling Silvanidae, Casnonidea apicicornis resembling Chrysomelidae, Statira resembling Carabidae and Paratenetus punctatus resembling Coccinellidae.

== Ecology ==
Lagriinae larvae feed in decaying vegetation. They can be found in stumps and under bark.

== Gallery ==
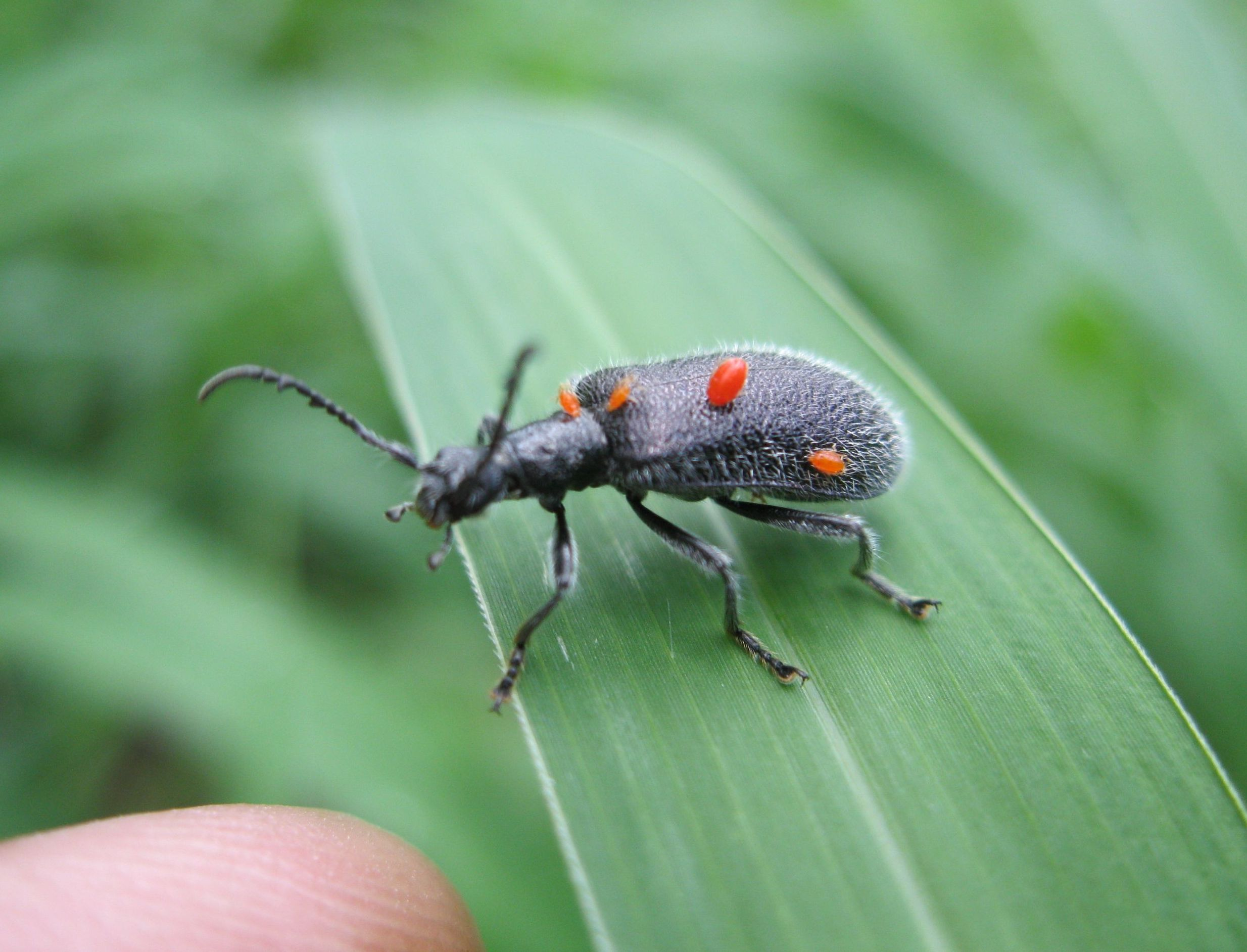
Cerogria sp. with attached mites (possibly Parasitengona)

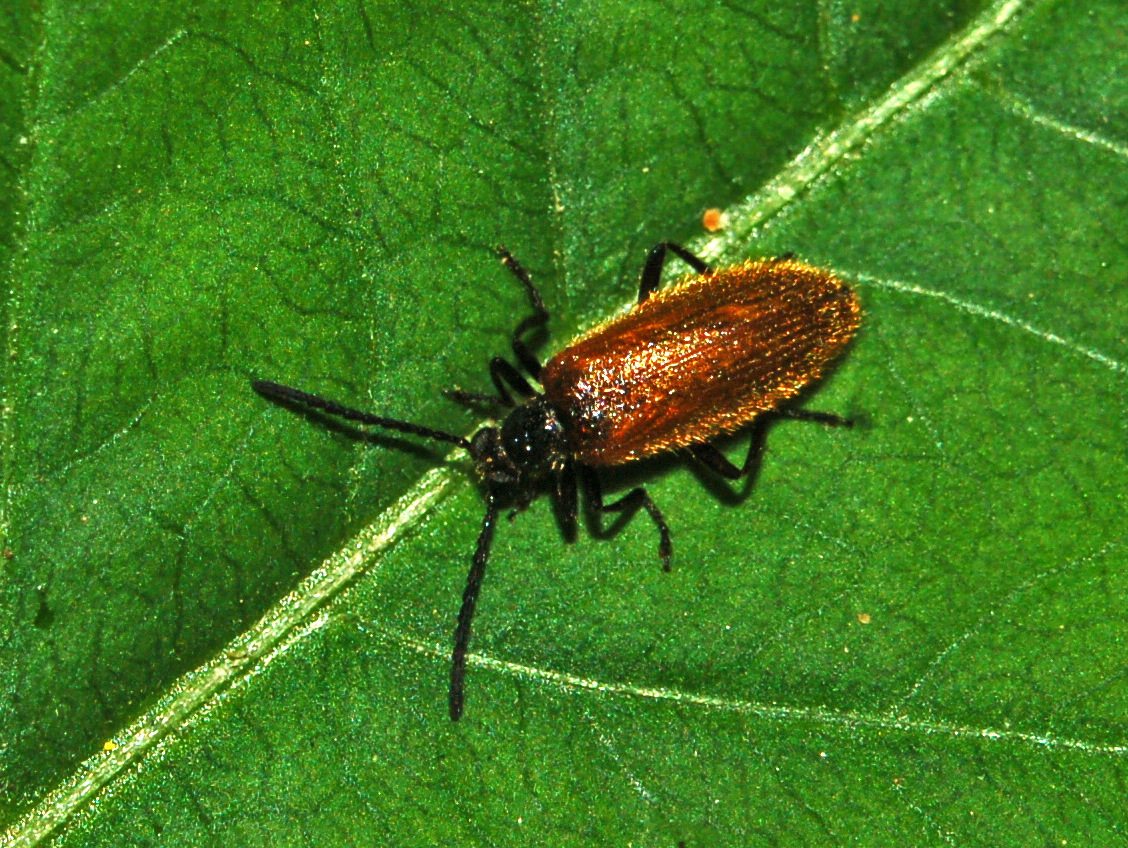
Lagria hirta

== See also ==
- List of Lagriinae genera
