= Acampsohelconinae =

Scientific classification
- Domain: Eukaryota
- Kingdom: Animalia
- Phylum: Arthropoda
- Class: Insecta
- Order: Hymenoptera
- Family: Braconidae
- Subfamily: Acampsohelconinae; Tobias, 1987

Tribes
- Acampsohelconini; Afrocampsini; Urosigalphini

Subfamily of wasps

The Acampsohelconinae are a subfamily of braconid parasitoid wasps. Extant members of this subfamily were previously included in the Helconinae, Blacinae, or Sigalphinae. The four genera included are †Acampsohelcon, Afrocampsis, Canalicephalus, and Urosigalphus.

== Description and distribution ==
Acampsohelconinae are non-cyclostome braconids with a carapace covering the metasoma. The outer hind tarsal claws are modified and much larger than the midtarsal claws.

Canalicephalus has an Indo-Australian distribution, Afrocampsis has an Afrotropical distribution, and Urosigalphus is found mostly in the New World with one species found in Japan.

== Biology ==
Hosts and habits of most Acampsohelconinae are unknown, but members of Urosigalphus are parasitoids of seed feeding beetle grubs in the Bruchidae and Curculionidae.
