= List of Eubazus species =

This is a list of 145 species in Eubazus, a genus of wasp in the family Braconidae.

== Eubazus species ==
- Eubazus abieticola van Achterberg & Kenis, 2000^{c g}
- Eubazus aequator (Herrich-Schäffer, 1838)^{c g}
- Eubazus aevenki Belokobylskij, 1994^{c g}
- Eubazus albicoxa Papp, 2005^{c g}
- Eubazus aliochinoi Belokobylskij, 1998^{c g}
- Eubazus antennalis Belokobylskij, 1994^{c g}
- Eubazus atricornis (Ashmead, 1889)^{c}
- Eubazus atricoxa Papp, 2005^{c g}
- Eubazus augustinus (Reinhard, 1867)^{c g}
- Eubazus azovicus Tobias & Perepechayenko, 1992^{c g}
- Eubazus bicolor (Szepligeti, 1900)^{c g}
- Eubazus bicornis (Martin, 1956)^{c g}
- Eubazus breviseta (Snoflak, 1953)^{c g}
- Eubazus bucculentis (Martin, 1956)^{c g}
- Eubazus calyptoides (Martin, 1956)^{c g}
- Eubazus canadensis (Provancher, 1881)^{c}
- Eubazus carinatus (Nees, 1816)^{c g}
- Eubazus chinensis (Watanabe, 1950)^{c g}
- Eubazus cingulatus (Szepligeti, 1896)^{c}
- Eubazus claviventris (Reinhard, 1867)^{c}
- Eubazus clypealis Tobias, 1986^{c g}
- Eubazus convexope van Achterberg, 2000^{c g}
- Eubazus corrugatus (Reinhard, 1867)^{c g}
- Eubazus crabilli (Martin, 1956)^{c g}
- Eubazus crassicornis (Brues, 1933)^{c g}
- Eubazus crassigaster (Provancher, 1886)^{c g}
- Eubazus cruentatus (Reinhard, 1867)^{c g}
- Eubazus cserskii Belokobylskij, 1998^{c g}
- Eubazus cubiculus Papp, 1998^{c g}
- Eubazus curtis Belokobylskij, 1998^{c g}
- Eubazus danielssoni Papp, 1999^{c g}
- Eubazus debilis Papp, 2005^{c g}
- Eubazus definitus (Muesebeck, 1957)^{c g}
- Eubazus denticlypealis (Tobias, 1986)^{c g}
- Eubazus denticulatus (Martin, 1956)^{c g}
- Eubazus destitutus (Ratzeburg, 1848)^{c g}
- Eubazus discrepans Papp, 2005^{c g}
- Eubazus electus (Muesebeck, 1957)^{c g}
- Eubazus elongatus van Achterberg, 2000^{c g}
- Eubazus eminens Papp, 2005^{c g}
- Eubazus eos Belokobylskij, 1994^{c g}
- Eubazus ernobii (Muesebeck, 1957)^{c g}
- Eubazus evanidus (Martin, 1956)^{c g}
- Eubazus exsertor (Reinhard, 1867)^{c g}
- Eubazus fasciatus (Nees, 1816)^{c g}
- Eubazus fiskei (Rohwer, 1913)^{c g}
- Eubazus flavifacies Belokobylskij, 1998^{c g}
- Eubazus flavipes (Haliday, 1835)^{c g}
- Eubazus frater Papp, 2005^{c g}
- Eubazus fuscipes (Herrich-Schäffer, 1838)^{c g}
- Eubazus gallicus (Reinhard, 1867)^{c}
- Eubazus gaullei (Granger, 1949)^{c g}
- Eubazus gigas (Fahringer, 1925)^{c g}
- Eubazus glabriclypealis van Achterberg, 2000^{c g}
- Eubazus gracilicornis (Brues, 1939)^{c g}
- Eubazus heothinus van Achterberg, 2000^{c g}
- Eubazus indeprehensus (Martin, 1956)^{c g}
- Eubazus interstitialis (Ratzeburg, 1844)^{c}
- Eubazus involutus Belokobylskij, 1998^{c g}
- Eubazus iterabilis Belokobylskij, 1998^{c g}
- Eubazus janus Belokobylskij, 1998^{c g}
- Eubazus junctus Belokobylskij, 1998^{c g}
- Eubazus kedrovyi Belokobylskij, 1998^{c g}
- Eubazus lapponicus (Thomson, 1892)^{c g}
- Eubazus latus Belokobylskij, 1998^{c g}
- Eubazus lepidus (Haliday, 1835)^{c g}
- Eubazus longicauda (Curtis, 1832)^{c g}
- Eubazus longicaudis (Ratzeburg, 1844)^{c g}
- Eubazus longicaudus (Provancher, 1886)^{c g}
- Eubazus longitempora Papp, 2005^{c g}
- Eubazus maacki Belokobylskij, 1998^{c g}
- Eubazus macrocephalus Nees, 1812^{c g}
- Eubazus macrurus (Thomson, 1892)^{c g}
- Eubazus major (Cresson, 1872)^{c g}
- Eubazus margaritovi Belokobylskij, 1994^{c g}
- Eubazus marginatus (Martin, 1956)^{c g}
- Eubazus mexicanus (Cresson, 1872)^{c}
- Eubazus micropilosus Belokobylskij, 1998^{c g}
- Eubazus micus Belokobylskij, 1998^{c g}
- Eubazus minutus (Ratzeburg, 1848)^{c g}
- Eubazus natalensis (Brues, 1926)^{c}
- Eubazus nigricoxis (Wesmael, 1835)^{c g}
- Eubazus nigripes (Reinhard, 1867)^{c g}
- Eubazus nigroventralis van Achterberg, 2003^{c g}
- Eubazus normalis (Brues, 1923)^{c g}
- Eubazus obtusus (Snoflak, 1953)^{c g}
- Eubazus ochyrus van Achterberg, 2000^{c g}
- Eubazus olegi Belokobylskij, 1994^{c g}
- Eubazus orchesiae (Ashmead, 1889)^{c g}
- Eubazus orientalis (Szepligeti, 1914)^{c g}
- Eubazus pallipes Nees, 1812^{c g}
- Eubazus parvulus (Reinhard, 1867)^{c}
- Eubazus patei (Martin, 1956)^{c g}
- Eubazus phymatodis (Ashmead, 1889)^{c g}
- Eubazus planifacialis van Achterberg, 2003^{c g}
- Eubazus punctatus (Ratzeburg, 1852)^{c g}
- Eubazus punctifer van Achterberg, 2003^{c g}
- Eubazus pusillus (Brullé, 1832)^{c g}
- Eubazus pygmaeus Belokobylskij, 1998^{c g}
- Eubazus regularis van Achterberg, 2000^{c g}
- Eubazus robustus (Ratzeburg, 1844)^{c g}
- Eubazus rotundiceps (Cresson, 1872)^{c g}
- Eubazus ruficoxis (Wesmael, 1835)^{c g}
- Eubazus rufithorax (Abdinbekova, 1969)^{c g}
- Eubazus rugosus (Ratzeburg, 1848)^{c g}
- Eubazus rugulosus Papp, 2005^{c g}
- Eubazus salicicola (Muesebeck, 1957)^{c g}
- Eubazus santacheza Belokobylskij, 1998^{c g}
- Eubazus satai (Watanabe, 1948)^{c g}
- Eubazus sayi (Muesebeck & Walkley, 1951)^{c g}
- Eubazus segmentatus (Marshall, 1889)^{c g}
- Eubazus semicastaneus (Marshall, 1893)^{c g}
- Eubazus semirugosus (Nees, 1816)^{c g}
- Eubazus shishiniovae van Achterberg, 2000^{c g}
- Eubazus shufanicus Belokobylskij, 1998^{c g}
- Eubazus sibiricus Belokobylskij, 1998^{c g}
- Eubazus sigalphoides (Marshall, 1889)^{c g}
- Eubazus simplex Belokobylskij, 1998^{c g}
- Eubazus sintuchae Belokobylskij, 1998^{c g}
- Eubazus sochiensis Tobias, 1976^{c g}
- Eubazus spasskii Belokobylskij, 1998^{c g}
- Eubazus stanleyi (Martin, 1956)^{c g}
- Eubazus stictopleurus (Martin, 1956)^{c g}
- Eubazus strigitergum (Cushman, 1930)^{c g}
- Eubazus subvagus Tobias, 1986^{c g}
- Eubazus sudeticus (Snoflak, 1953)^{c g}
- Eubazus taiga Belokobylskij, 1998^{c g}
- Eubazus tauricus Tobias, 1986^{c g}
- Eubazus teres Papp, 2005^{c g}
- Eubazus terminalis Belokobylskij, 1998^{c g}
- Eubazus testaceipes (Grese, 1928)^{c g}
- Eubazus thoracicus (Ashmead, 1894)^{c g}
- Eubazus tibialis (Haliday, 1835)^{c g}
- Eubazus tomoxiae (Rohwer, 1915)^{c g}
- Eubazus topali Papp, 2005^{c g}
- Eubazus tricoloripes van Achterberg, 2000^{c g}
- Eubazus tridentatus (Martin, 1956)^{c g}
- Eubazus trilobatus (Say, 1836)^{c g}
- Eubazus tumorulus Papp, 2005^{c g}
- Eubazus vagus (Reinhard, 1867)^{c g}
- Eubazus venturii (Schrottky, 1902)^{c g}
- Eubazus vitripennis (Herrich-Schäffer, 1838)^{c g}
- Eubazus vladimiri Belokobylskij, 1994^{c g}
- Eubazus wilmattae (Brues, 1910)^{c g}
- Eubazus zelinensis van Achterberg, 2000^{c g}

Data sources: i = ITIS, c = Catalogue of Life, g = GBIF, b = Bugguide.net
