= Triaspis =

Triaspis is a scientific name for several genera and may refer to:

- Triaspis (plant), a genus of plants in the family Malpighiaceae
- Triaspis (wasp), a genus of insects in the family Braconidae
