= List of Triaspis species =

This is a list of 117 species in Triaspis, a genus of wasp in the family Braconidae.

== Triaspis species ==
- Triaspis abditiva Martin, 1956^{c g}
- Triaspis aequoris Martin, 1956^{c g}
- Triaspis affinis (Herrich-Schäffer, 1838)^{c}
- Triaspis algirica Snoflak, 1953^{c g}
- Triaspis angustiventris de Saeger, 1948^{c g}
- Triaspis anomala Brues, 1939^{c g}
- Triaspis apionis (Rondani, 1872)^{c g}
- Triaspis aquila Martin, 1956^{c g}
- Triaspis armeniaca Tobias, 1976^{c g}
- Triaspis azteca Martin, 1952^{c g}
- Triaspis bambusae de Saeger, 1948^{c g}
- Triaspis bangela Papp, 1984^{c g}
- Triaspis bictica (Papp, 1993)^{c g}
- Triaspis breviventris (Thomson, 1892)^{c g}
- Triaspis brucivora (Rondani, 1877)^{c g}
- Triaspis buccula (Papp, 1984)^{c g}
- Triaspis caledonica (Marshall, 1888)^{c g}
- Triaspis carentica Lopez, 2004^{c g}
- Triaspis caucasica Abdinbekova, 1969^{c g}
- Triaspis caudata (Nees, 1816)^{c g}
- Triaspis cervicalis (Cockerell, 1921)^{c g}
- Triaspis claripennis Tobias, 1967^{c g}
- Triaspis collaris (Thomson, 1874)^{c g}
- Triaspis complanellae (Hartig, 1847)^{c g}
- Triaspis concava Chou & Hsu, 1996^{c g}
- Triaspis concisa (Fullaway, 1919)^{c g}
- Triaspis conico Lopez, 2004^{c g}
- Triaspis convexa Belokobylskij, 1998^{c g}
- Triaspis corusca Papp, 1984^{c g}
- Triaspis curculiovorus Papp & Maeto, 1992^{c g}
- Triaspis daci (Szepligeti, 1911)^{c g}
- Triaspis deversa (Papp, 1993)^{c g}
- Triaspis devinensis Snoflak, 1953^{c g}
- Triaspis eflucta Papp, 1998^{c g}
- Triaspis elaeagni Tobias, 1986^{c g}
- Triaspis emarginata (Szepligeti, 1914)^{c}
- Triaspis eugenii Wharton & Lopez-Martinez, 2000^{c g}
- Triaspis facialis (Ratzeburg, 1852)^{c g}
- Triaspis fijica (Papp, 1993)^{c g}
- Triaspis flavipalpis (Wesmael, 1835)^{c g}
- Triaspis flavofacies Papp, 1999^{c g}
- Triaspis floricola (Wesmael, 1835)^{c g}
- Triaspis fulgens Papp, 1971^{c g}
- Triaspis fumosa Papp, 1984^{c g}
- Triaspis glaberrima Snoflak, 1953^{c g}
- Triaspis graeca Papp, 2003^{c g}
- Triaspis halidayi Martin, 1956^{c g}
- Triaspis hansoni Lopez, 2004^{c g}
- Triaspis hispanica Papp, 1999^{c g}
- Triaspis imitatus Papp, 1993^{g}
- Triaspis krivolutskayae Belokobylskij, 1994^{c g}
- Triaspis kurtogaster Martin, 1956^{c g}
- Triaspis laticarinata Martin, 1956^{c g}
- Triaspis lugubris Snoflak, 1953^{c g}
- Triaspis luteipes (Thomson, 1874)^{c}
- Triaspis magnafoveae Martin, 1956^{c g}
- Triaspis masoni Lopez, 2004^{c g}
- Triaspis matercula Martin, 1956^{c g}
- Triaspis mervarki Papp, 1999^{c g}
- Triaspis metacarpalis Tobias, 1986^{c g}
- Triaspis minuta Papp, 1971^{c}
- Triaspis nanchaensis Ma, Yang & Yao, 2002^{c g}
- Triaspis nishidai Papp, 1984^{c g}
- Triaspis nobilis de Saeger, 1948^{c g}
- Triaspis obscurella (Nees, 1816)^{c g}
- Triaspis ocellulata Martin, 1956^{c g}
- Triaspis odontochila Martin, 1956^{c g}
- Triaspis odrina (Papp, 1993)^{c g}
- Triaspis oranga (Papp, 1993)^{c g}
- Triaspis pallipes (Nees, 1816)^{c g}
- Triaspis pernegrus (Papp, 1993)^{c g}
- Triaspis pinsapo (Papp, 1993)^{c g}
- Triaspis pissodis Viereck, 1912^{c g}
- Triaspis podlussanyi Papp, 1998^{c g}
- Triaspis prima (Brethes, 1925)^{c g}
- Triaspis prinops Papp, 1984^{c g}
- Triaspis pumila Papp, 1984^{c g}
- Triaspis pygmaea (Szepligeti, 1913)^{c}
- Triaspis rectangulata Martin, 1956^{c g}
- Triaspis rimulosa (Thomson, 1892)^{c}
- Triaspis ruficollis (Cameron, 1905)^{c}
- Triaspis schrottkyi (Szépligeti, 1908)^{c g}
- Triaspis scotospila Papp, 1984^{c g}
- Triaspis sculpturata (Szepligeti, 1898)^{g}
- Triaspis sekerai Snoflak, 1953^{c g}
- Triaspis semiareola Papp, 1999^{c g}
- Triaspis semiglabra (Szepligeti, 1902)^{c g}
- Triaspis semilissa Snoflak, 1953^{c g}
- Triaspis shangchia Chou & Hsu, 1996^{c g}
- Triaspis shawi Lopez, 2004^{c g}
- Triaspis similator (Szepligeti, 1901)^{g}
- Triaspis simplicifrons (Brues, 1924)^{c g}
- Triaspis stenochila Martin, 1956^{c g}
- Triaspis stenogaster Martin, 1956^{c g}
- Triaspis stictostiba Martin, 1956^{c g}
- Triaspis stilpnogaster Martin, 1956^{c g}
- Triaspis striatula (Nees, 1816)^{c g}
- Triaspis striola (Thomson, 1874)^{c g}
- Triaspis sulcata (Szépligeti, 1901)^{c g}
- Triaspis tadorna Papp, 1984^{c g}
- Triaspis terebra (de Saeger, 1948)^{c g}
- Triaspis testacea (Szepligeti, 1914)^{c g}
- Triaspis thomsoni Fahringer, 1934^{c g}
- Triaspis thoracica (Curtis, 1860)^{c}
- Triaspis transita Papp, 1984^{c g}
- Triaspis tricolorata Tobias & Saidov, 1997^{c g}
- Triaspis tripartita (Szepligeti, 1905)^{c}
- Triaspis umbofer (Papp, 1993)^{c g}
- Triaspis vernalis Belokobylskij, 1998^{c g}
- Triaspis versata Papp, 1984^{c g}
- Triaspis vestiticida Viereck, 1912^{c g}
- Triaspis virginiensis (Ashmead, 1889)^{c g}
- Triaspis warnckei Papp, 1999^{c g}
- Triaspis whartoni Lopez, 2004^{c g}
- Triaspis wittei de Saeger, 1948^{c g}
- Triaspis xanthochila Martin, 1958^{c g}
- Triaspis xylophagi Fischer, 1966^{c g}

This is a list of 117 species in Triaspis, a genus of wasp in the family Braconidae. Data sources: i = ITIS, c = Catalogue of Life, g = GBIF, b = Bugguide.net
