= Aspigonus =

Scientific classification
- Kingdom: Animalia
- Phylum: Arthropoda
- Class: Insecta
- Order: Hymenoptera
- Family: Braconidae
- Subfamily: Brachistinae
- Tribe: Diospilini
- Genus: Aspigonus; Wesmael, 1835

Genus of wasps

Aspigonus is a genus of wasps belonging to the family Braconidae.

The genus was first described by Wesmael in 1835.

The species of this genus are found in Europe and North America.

Species:

- Aspigonus flavicornis (Nees, 1834)
