= Diospilini =

Scientific classification
- Kingdom: Animalia
- Phylum: Arthropoda
- Class: Insecta
- Order: Hymenoptera
- Family: Braconidae
- Subfamily: Brachistinae
- Tribe: Diospilini; Förster, 1863

Genus of wasps

Diospilini is a tribe of parasitoid wasp belonging to the family Braconidae and subfamily Brachistinae.

== Genera ==
- Aspicolpus Wesmael, 1838^{c g}
- Aspigonus Wesmael, 1835^{c g}
- Atree Ranjith, van Achterberg & Priyadarsanan, 2022
- Depelbus Papp, 1993
- Diospilus Haliday, 1833^{c g b}
- Nipponocolpus Belokobylskij & Fujie, 2017
- Schauinslandia Ashmead, 1900
- Taphaeus Wesmael, 1835^{c g}
- Topaldios Papp, 1995
- Vadumasonium Kammerer, 2006^{c g}
