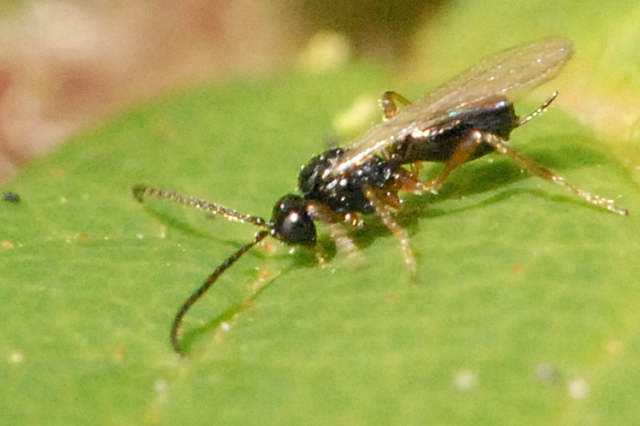
- Blacus humilis

Scientific classification
- Kingdom: Animalia
- Phylum: Arthropoda
- Class: Insecta
- Order: Hymenoptera
- Family: Braconidae
- Subfamily: Brachistinae
- Tribe: Blacini

= Blacini =

Tribe of wasps

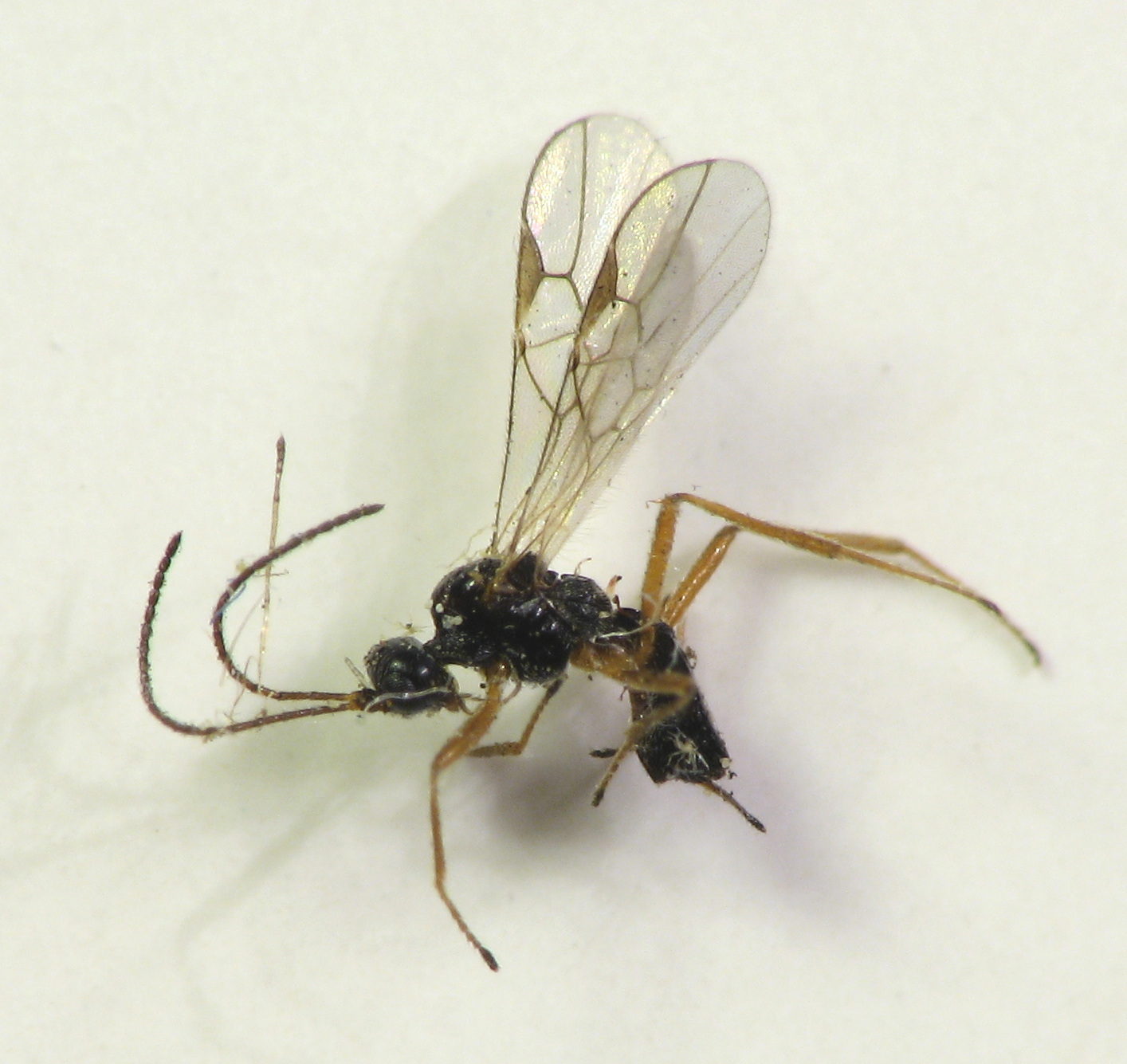
Blacus female

Blacini is a tribe of braconid Parasitoid wasps.

== Taxonomy and phylogeny ==
Blacini was formerly treated as the subfamily Blacinae, but the subfamily was synonymized under Brachistinae based on molecular evidence in 2011. The former Blacinae were given tribal status under Brachistinae.

== Description and distribution ==
Members of this tribe are tiny and generally black or brown in color. They have non-cyclostome mouthparts and a carina, or ridge, along the back of the head.

These wasps have a worldwide distribution. The genus Blacus is by far the most common and has a cosmopolitan range, with about 40 described species in the New World. The other genera are more restricted, and mostly found in South and Central America.

== Biology ==
Little is known about the biology of species within Blacini, but Blacus species are known to be parasitoids of beetle larvae. Males of some Blacus species are known to form mating swarms.

== Genera ==
These genera are members of the tribe Blacini:

- Apoblacus van Achterberg, 1976
- Blacometeorus Tobias, 1976^{c g}
- Blacus Nees von Esenbeck, 1818^{c g b}
- †Palaeoblacus Statz, 1936

Data sources: i = ITIS, c = Catalogue of Life, g = GBIF, b = Bugguide.net
