= Římov (Třebíč District) =

- Municipality
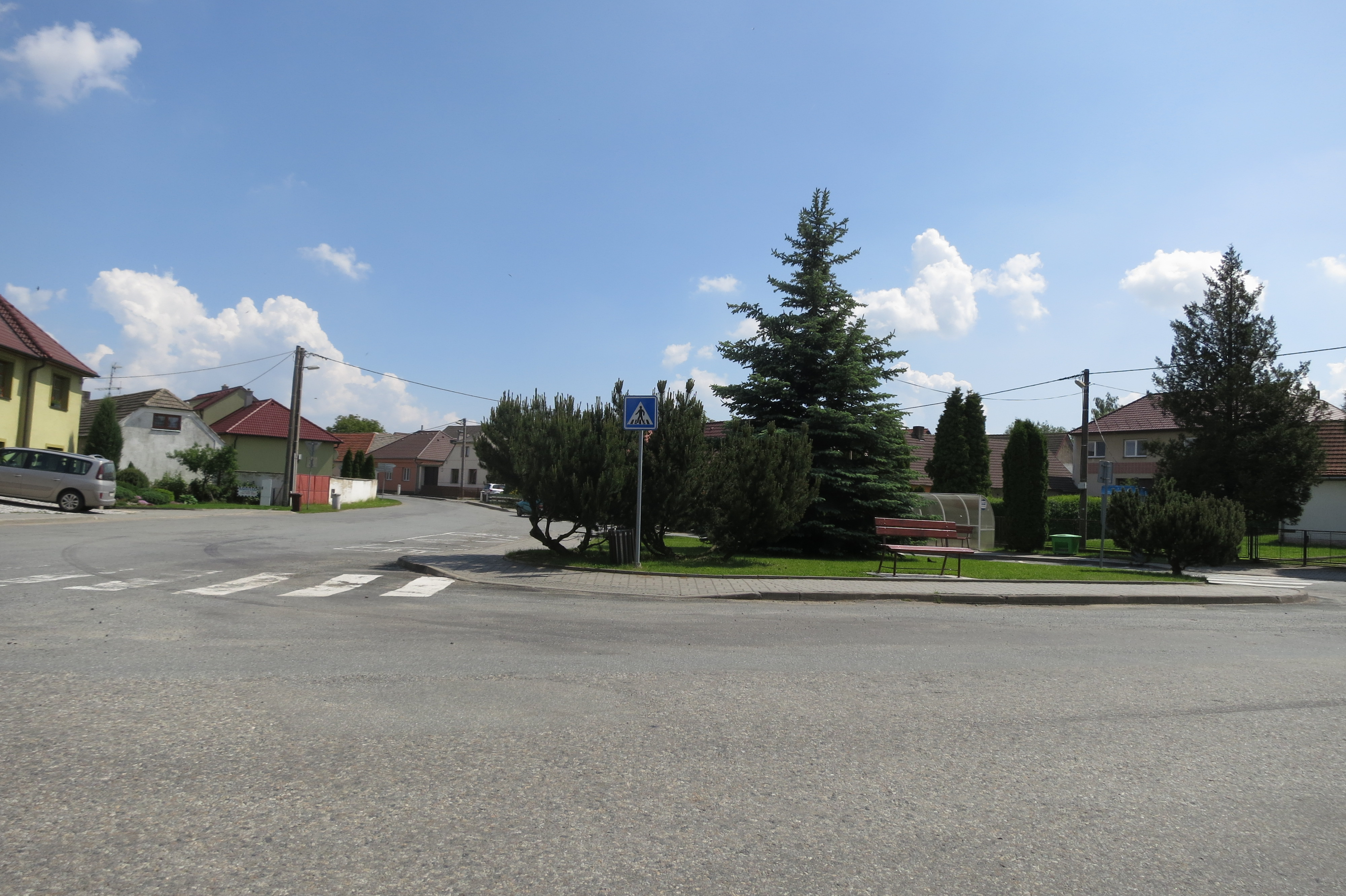
- Centre of Římov

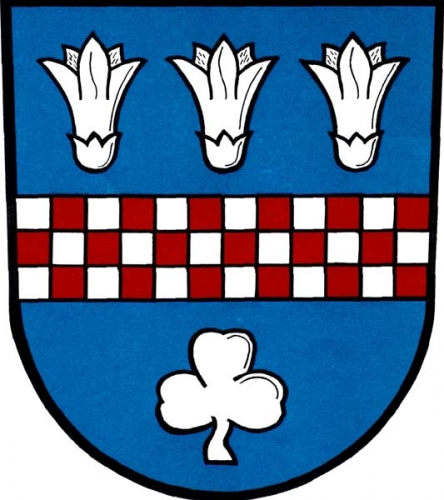
- Flag Coat of arms

- Location in the Czech Republic
- Coordinates: 49°10′12″N 15°45′28″E
- Country: Czech Republic
- Region: Vysočina
- District: Třebíč
- First mentioned: 1257

Area
  - Total: 9.16 km^{2} (3.54 sq mi)
- Elevation: 506 m (1,660 ft)

Population (2026-01-01)
  - Total: 416
  - Density: 45.4/km^{2} (118/sq mi)
- Time zone: UTC+1 (CET)
  - Summer (DST): UTC+2 (CEST)
- Postal code: 675 22
- Website: www.obecrimov.cz

Římov is a municipality and village in Třebíč District in the Vysočina Region of the Czech Republic. It has about 400 inhabitants.

Římov lies approximately 11 kilometres (7 mi) south-west of Třebíč, 28 km (17 mi) south-east of Jihlava, and 141 km (88 mi) south-east of Prague.

== Demographics ==
Historical population
Year	Pop.	±%
1869	518	—
1880	535	+3.3%
1890	567	+6.0%
1900	579	+2.1%
1910	575	−0.7%
1921	605	+5.2%
1930	592	−2.1%
1950	498	−15.9%
1961	526	+5.6%
1970	472	−10.3%
1980	458	−3.0%
1991	420	−8.3%
2001	402	−4.3%
2011	406	+1.0%
2021	430	+5.9%
Source: Censuses

== Notable people ==
- Jan Šnoflák (1891–1954), entomologist
