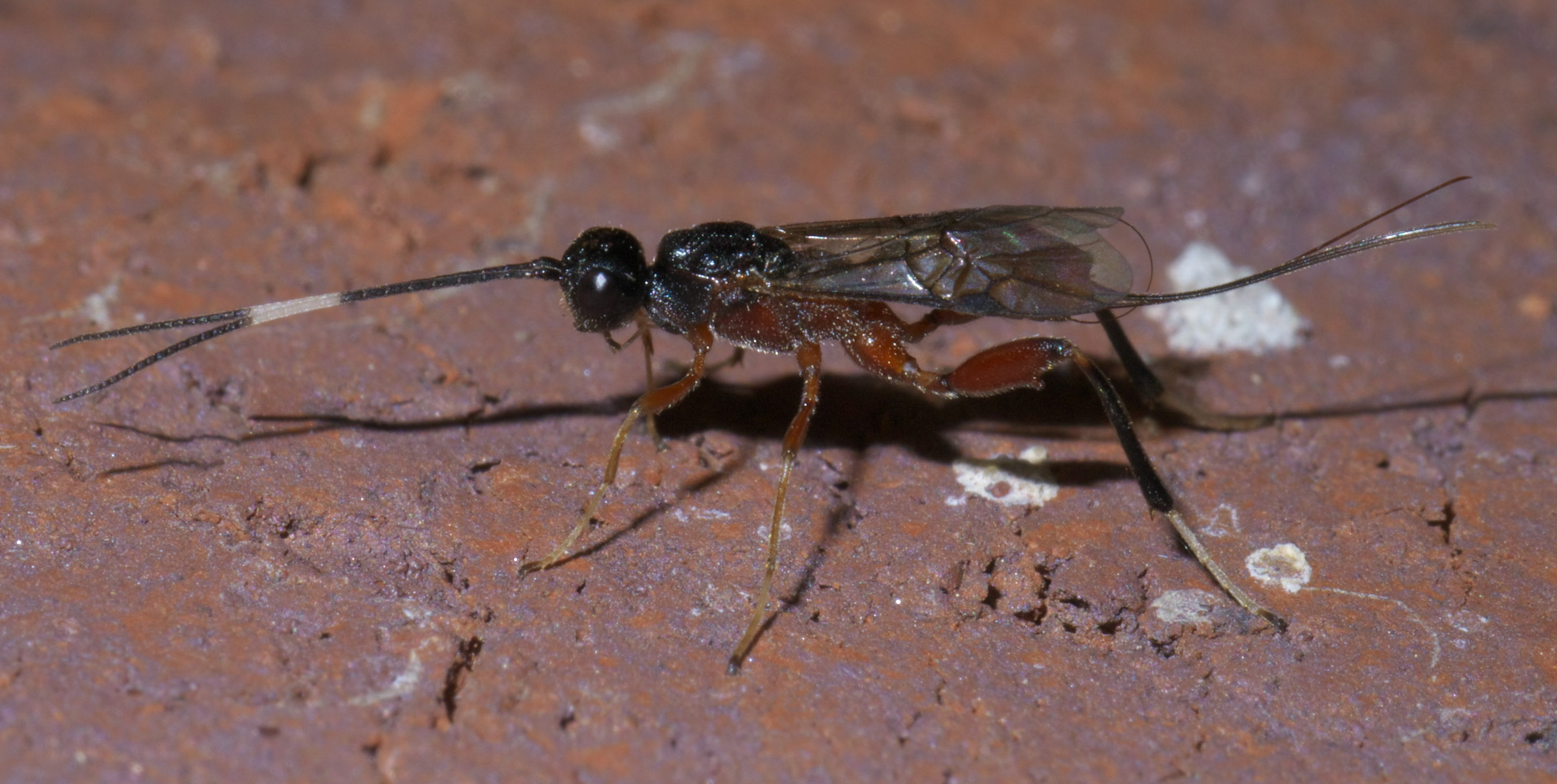
- Wroughtonia ligator
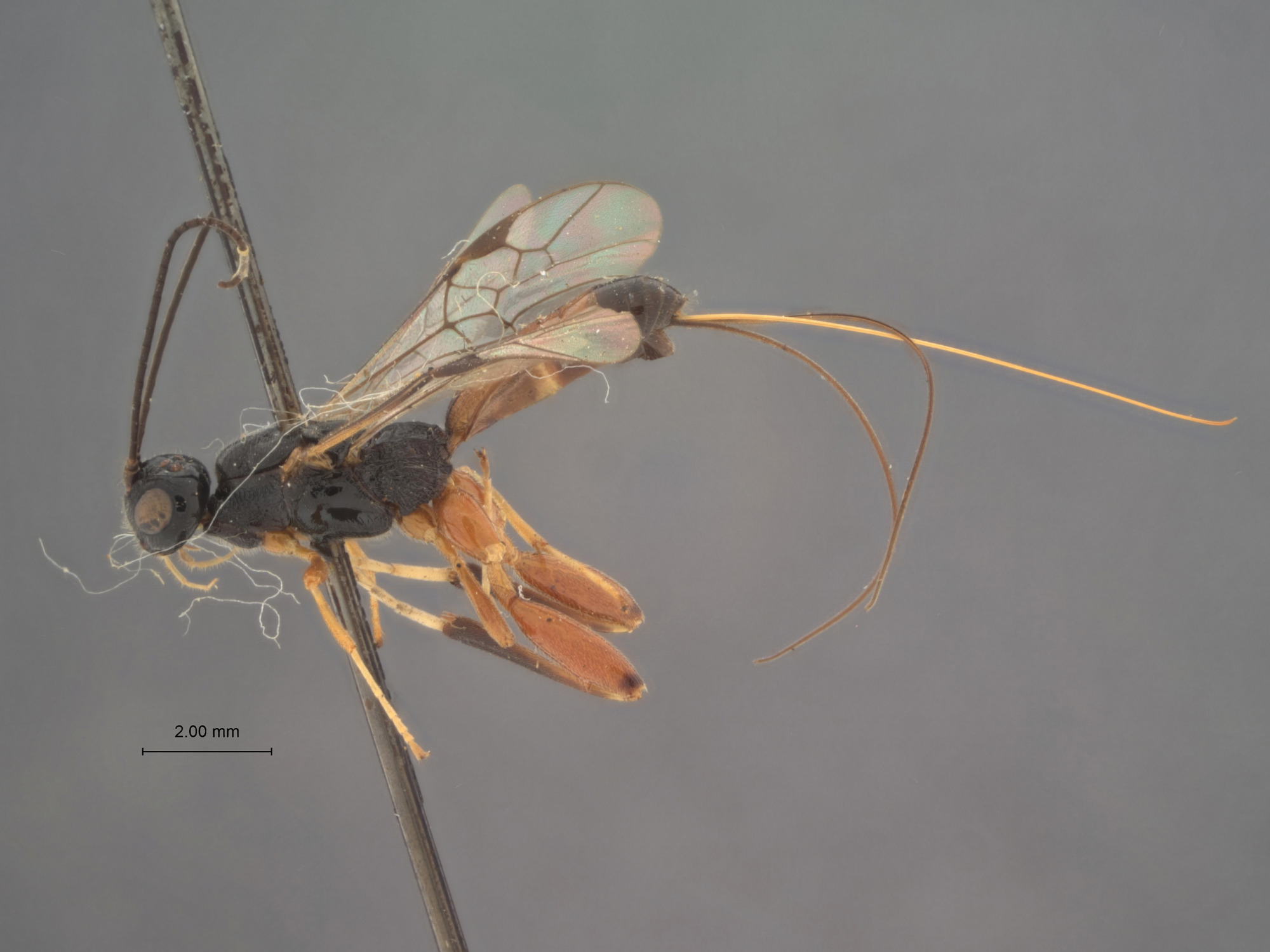
- Wroughtonia castaneae

Scientific classification
- Kingdom: Animalia
- Phylum: Arthropoda
- Clade: Pancrustacea
- Class: Insecta
- Order: Hymenoptera
- Family: Braconidae
- Subfamily: Helconinae; Forster, 1862

= Helconinae =

Subfamily of wasps

Helconinae is a subfamily of wasp that belongs to the family Braconidae.

== Taxonomy and phylogeny ==
Helconinae has historically been a large subfamily of 4 tribes comprising about 40 genera. Following many changes to classification and included groups over the years, only one of these original tribes, Helconini, remains. Cenocoeliini was split into a new subfamily, Cenocoeliinae, by van Achterberg in 1984. Then, the tribes Brachistini and Diospilini were split into another new subfamily, Brachistinae, by Sharanowski et al. in 2011. The remaining Helconini make up about 12 genera. The Helconini subtribe Vervootihelconina was since elevated to tribal status as Vervootihelconini. The enigmatic Ussurohelconini, previously transferred to Cenocoeliinae, was again recovered as a tribe of Helconinae.

=== Genera ===
The following genera belong to the subfamily Helconinae, they are organized within their respective tribes:

=== Helconini Förster, 1863 ===
- Acarohelcon van Achterberg et Chen, 2017
- Austrohelcon Turner, 1918
- Calohelcon Turner, 1918
- Eumacrocentrus Ashmead, 1900
- Helcon Nees von Esenbeck, 1812
- Mangshia van Achterberg & Chen, 2004
- Parahelcon Kokujew, 1901
- Trichiohelcon Turuer, 1918
- Wroughtonia Cameron, 1899

=== Ussurohelconini van Achterberg, 1994 ===
- Ussurohelcon Belokobylskij, 1989

=== Vervoortihelconini van Achterberg, 1997 ===
- Vervoortihelcon van Achterberg, 1998
