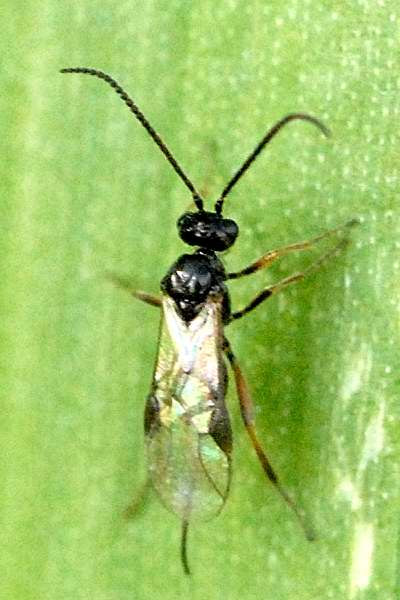

Scientific classification
- Kingdom: Animalia
- Phylum: Arthropoda
- Class: Insecta
- Order: Hymenoptera
- Family: Braconidae
- Subfamily: Brachistinae
- Genus: Eubazus; Nees von Esenbeck, 1812

= Eubazus =

Genus of wasps

Eubazus is a genus of wasp in the family Braconidae. There are at least 140 described species in Eubazus.

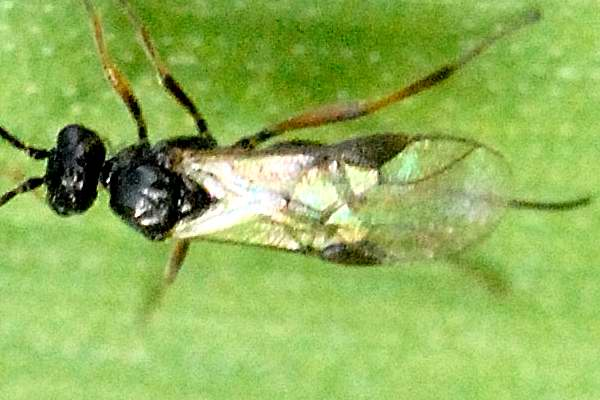

== See also ==
- List of Eubazus species
