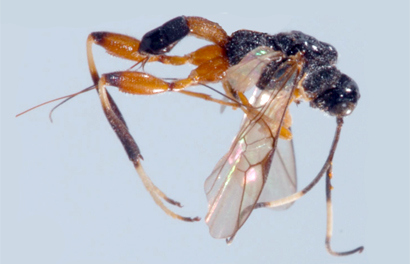

Scientific classification
- Domain: Eukaryota
- Kingdom: Animalia
- Phylum: Arthropoda
- Class: Insecta
- Order: Hymenoptera
- Family: Braconidae
- Genus: Wroughtonia
- Species: W. brevicarinata

Binomial name
- Wroughtonia brevicarinata (Yan & Chen, 2014)

Synonyms
- Spasskia brevicarinata Yan & Chen, 2014

= Wroughtonia brevicarinata =

Species of wasp

Wroughtonia brevicarinata is a species of parasitoid wasp native to the Guizhou and Yunnan provinces of China. The female body is 8.2 millimeters long, with 7.3 millimeter forewings. The ovipositor, when fully extended, measures 5.5 millimeters long. General coloration is black, however, the first tergite is yellow. The fore and mid legs are also yellow, while the hind pair are reddish-brown and whitish-yellow. The antennae are dark brown, with a whitish-yellow stripe between the 11th and 15th flagellomeres No males of the species have been observed to date. The species name is derived from Latin brevi, meaning "short" and carinata, the word for "carina". This literally means that the species has a short dorsal carinae as part of the first tergite.
