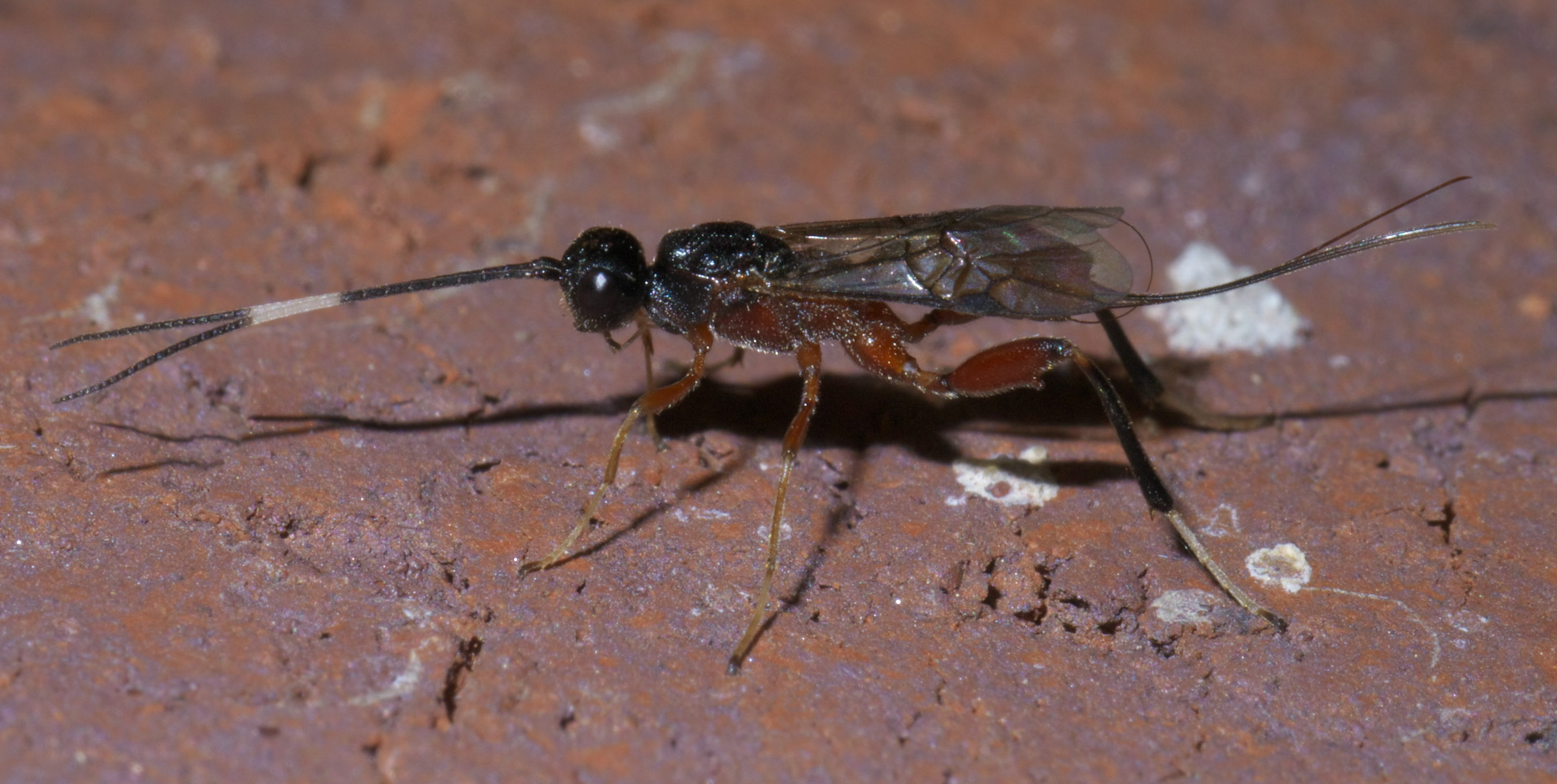
- Wroughtonia ligator
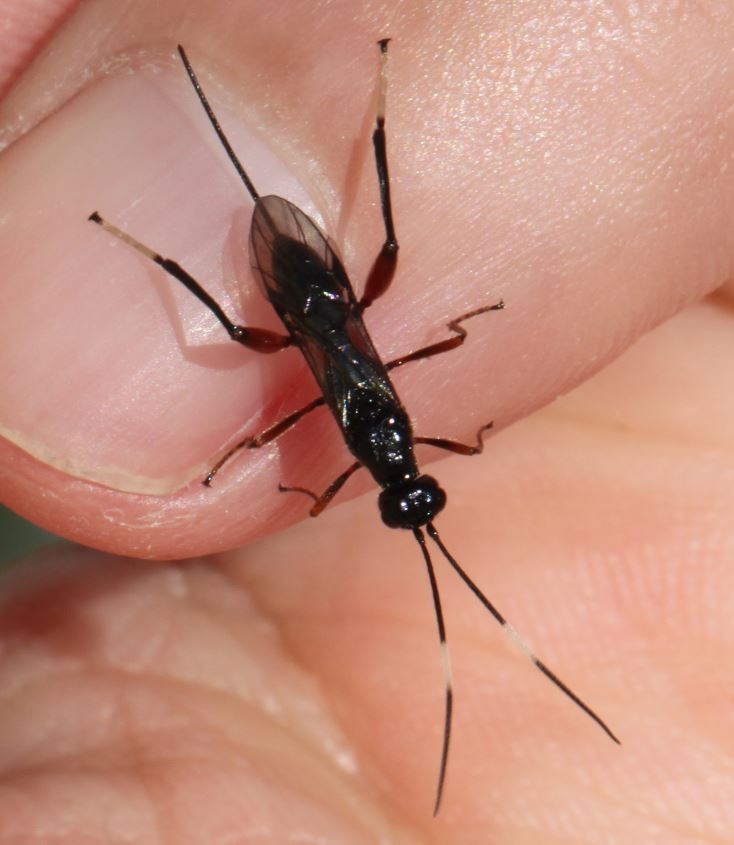
- Wroughtonia spinator

Scientific classification
- Kingdom: Animalia
- Phylum: Arthropoda
- Clade: Pancrustacea
- Class: Insecta
- Order: Hymenoptera
- Family: Braconidae
- Subfamily: Helconinae
- Genus: Wroughtonia; Cameron, 1899

Species
- 50+ (See text)

Synonyms
- Spasskia Belokobylskij, 1989; Helconidea Viereck, 1914; Duportia Kieffer, 1921

= Wroughtonia =

Genus of wasps

Wroughtonia is a genus of Braconid wasps that belongs to the subfamily Helconinae. It is a medium-sized genus.

== Distribution ==
Although this genus has a wide distribution, most species have mainly been found to inhabit the Eastern Palaearctic and northeastern Oriental regions. There are few species that have been reported from the Western Palaearctic, Nearctic, northern Neotropical regions and the remainder of the Oriental region.

Several species have been reported on the island of Borneo. They include Wroughtonia belalongensis, Wroughtonia variivena and Wroughtonia vermiculata. The biology of all known Bornean species are poorly known.

== Biology ==
=== Parasitism ===
It is classified as a koinobiont endoparasitoid meaning that they are able to develop inside a moving and feeding organism for a significant period during the development of the parasitoid. They parasitize beetle larvae in wood or cones, especially beetles that belongs to the families Cerambycidae (longhorn beetles) and Buprestidae (jewel beetles).

Some species of parasitoid wasps such as those of this family and Platygastroidea are able to inject eggs that have specialized membranes that differentiates into autonomous cells known as teratocytes. They are released into the host haemolymph when the parasitoid egg hatches. Teratocytes are able to products proteins and miRNAs that interfere with host hormones such as juvenile hormones or ecdysteroids that arrests the hosts growth and control their growth and metamorphosis. They are also able to inhibit protein synthesis.

=== Viral association ===
Similarly to many parasitoid wasps, this species harbours endogenous viruses that are from the family of the Polydnaviridae. The virus lineage that associated with Brancoid wasps are known as Bracoviruses. They will infect the wasps host cells by discharging their DNA into the nuclei which, as a consequence, integrates segments of viral DNA into the into the wasps genome which makes them start to produce viral gene products such as tyrosine phosphatases (PTPs).

These viral products both have a strong effect on the immune system of the wasp and are important to the regulation of the hosts growth. Regulation of growth is mainly achieved by altering hormone levels such as juvenile hormones and ecdysteroids or neuropeptides. These hormones effect the hosts metamorphosis, pupation and feeding behaviour. They will also induce changes in metabolic processes which will result in hyperglycemia, reduction of weight and the stopping of feeding behavior. While less documented and studied, these viruses may prolong the host development time and increase its final weight as seen in Manduca.

== Taxonomy ==
=== Species ===
The family which this genus is within, Braconidae, is an extremely diverse family being the second species-rich family in the order Hymenoptera with approximately 17,000 recognized species. The genus Wroughtonia is also a diverse with over 50 species described belonging to this genus:

These 56 species belong to the genus Wroughtonia:

- Wroughtonia acuta Yan & Chen^{g}
- Wroughtonia alba Chou & Hsu, 1998
- Wroughtonia albobasalis van Achterberg & Chen^{g}
- Wroughtonia angularis Long, 2020
- Wroughtonia areolata Yan & van Achterberg^{g}
- Wroughtonia aspera Long, 2020
- Wroughtonia atkinsoni Gupta & Sharma, 1976
- Wroughtonia belalongensis Yan & Polaszek
- Wroughtonia bifurcata Yan & van Achterberg
- Wroughtonia borealis (Cresson, 1873)
- Wroughtonia brachygena Yan & Chen^{g}
- Wroughtonia breviantennata Yan & Chen^{g}
- Wroughtonia brevicarinata Yan & Chen, 2014
- Wroughtonia castaneae (Viereck, 1912)^{c g}
- Wroughtonia chui Yan & Chen^{g}
- Wroughtonia cincticornis (Kieffer, 1921)^{c g}
- Wroughtonia claviventris Wesmael, 1835
- Wroughtonia coffeana Long, 2020
- Wroughtonia cornuta Cameron, 1899
- Wroughtonia dentator (Fabricius, 1804)
- Wroughtonia elongata Long, 2020
- Wroughtonia eurygenys Yan & Chen^{g}
- Wroughtonia ferruginea (Brues, 1907)
- Wroughtonia frigida (Cresson, 1873)
- Wroughtonia grandis (Ashmead, 1889)
- Wroughtonia granulosa Gupta & Sharma, 1976
- Wroughtonia hei Yan & Chen^{g}
- Wroughtonia hatinhensis Long & van Achterberg, 2020
- Wroughtonia himachali Gupta & Sharma, 1976
- Wroughtonia indica Singh, Belokobylskij & Chauhan, 2005
- Wroughtonia jiangliae van Achterberg & Chen^{g}
- Wroughtonia laevis Long, 2020
- Wroughtonia ligator (Say, 1824)
- Wroughtonia mikagei Hedqvist & Togashi, 1979^{c g}
- Wroughtonia necydalidis (Cushman, 1931)
- Wroughtonia nigrifemoralis Yan & van Achterberg^{g}
- Wroughtonia obtusa Yan & van Achterberg
- Wroughtonia occidentalis (Cresson, 1865)
- Wroughtonia petila Chou & Hsu, 1998
- Wroughtonia plana Long, 2020
- Wroughtonia pterolophiae Chou & Hsu, 1998
- Wroughtonia rugosa Yan & Chen
- Wroughtonia ruspator (Linnaeus, 1758)
- Wroughtonia sibirica Tobias, 1967^{g}
- Wroughtonia similis Long, 2020
- Wroughtonia simulata Long, 2020
- Wroughtonia sonla Long, 2020
- Wroughtonia spinator (Lepeletier, 1825)
- Wroughtonia striata Gupta & Sharma, 1976
- Wroughtonia truncata Gupta & Sharma, 1976
- Wroughtonia uchidai (Watanabe, 1931)
- Wroughtonia undulata Long & van Achterberg, 2020
- Wroughtonia unicornis (Turner, 1918)
- Wroughtonia varifemora Yan & Chen
- Wroughtonia variivena Yan & Polaszek
- Wroughtonia vermiculata Yan & Polaszek
- Wroughtonia vietnamica Long, 2020
- Wroughtonia yaanensis Yan & Chen^{g}
- Wroughtonia zhejiangensis Yan & van Achterberg

Data sources: c = Catalogue of Life, g = GBIF,

== Gallery ==
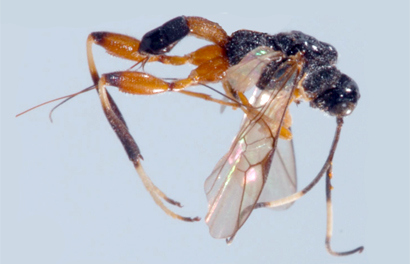
Wroughtonia brevicarinata

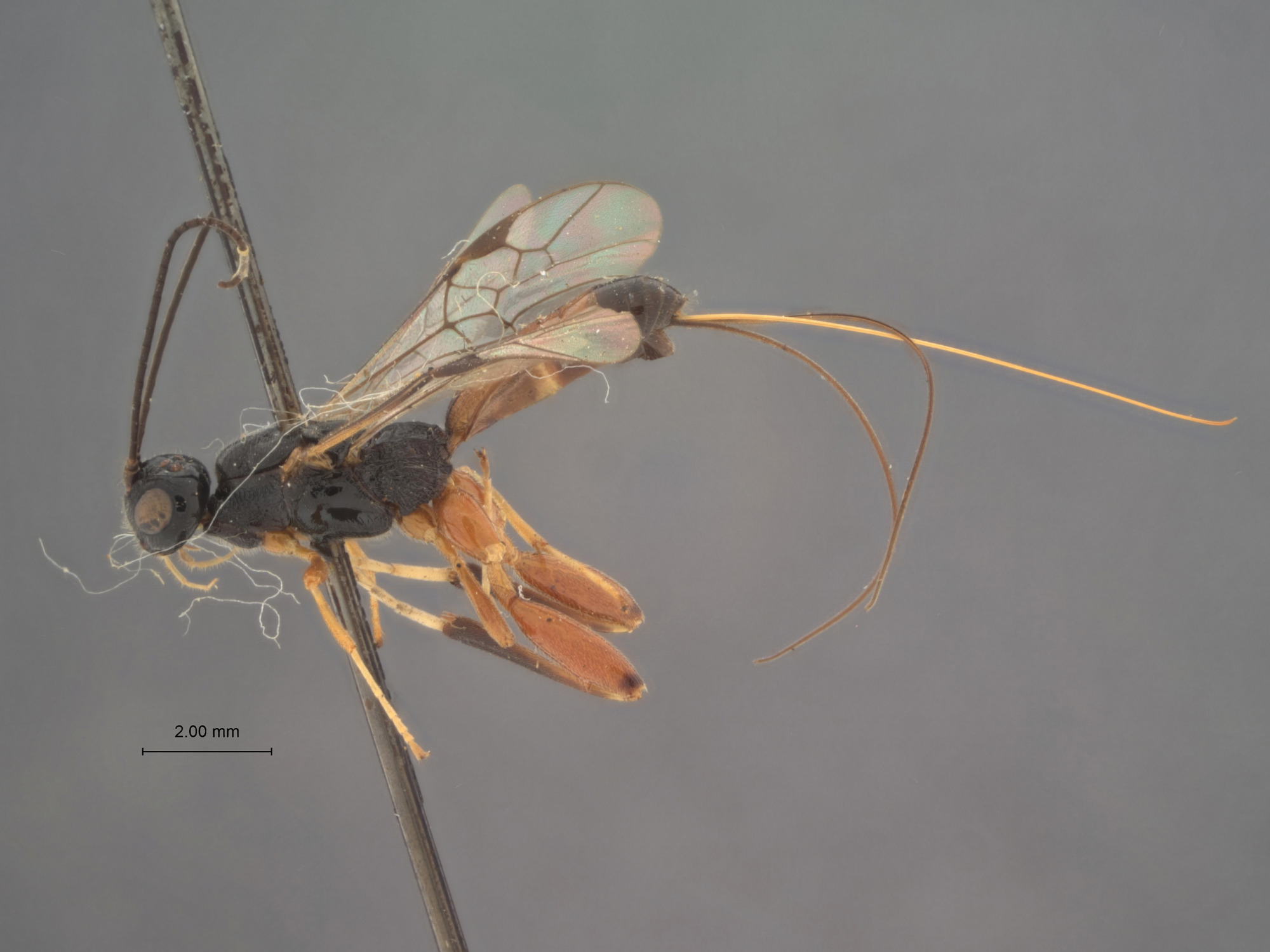
Wroughtonia castaneae

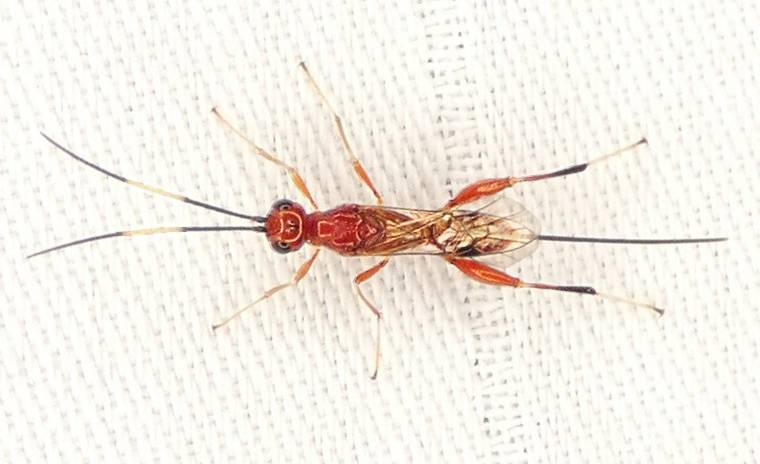
Wroughtonia ferruginea

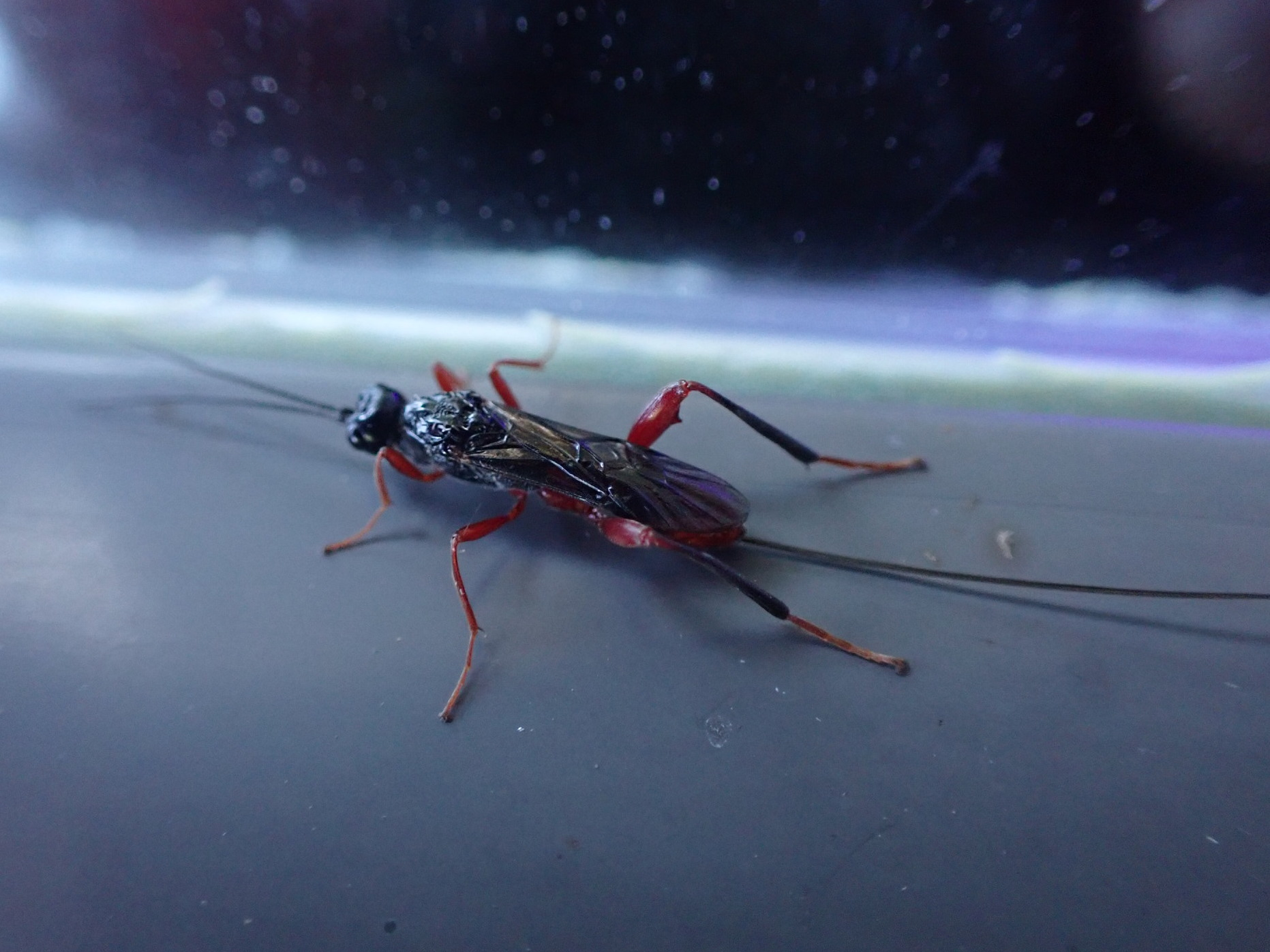
Wroughtonia frigida

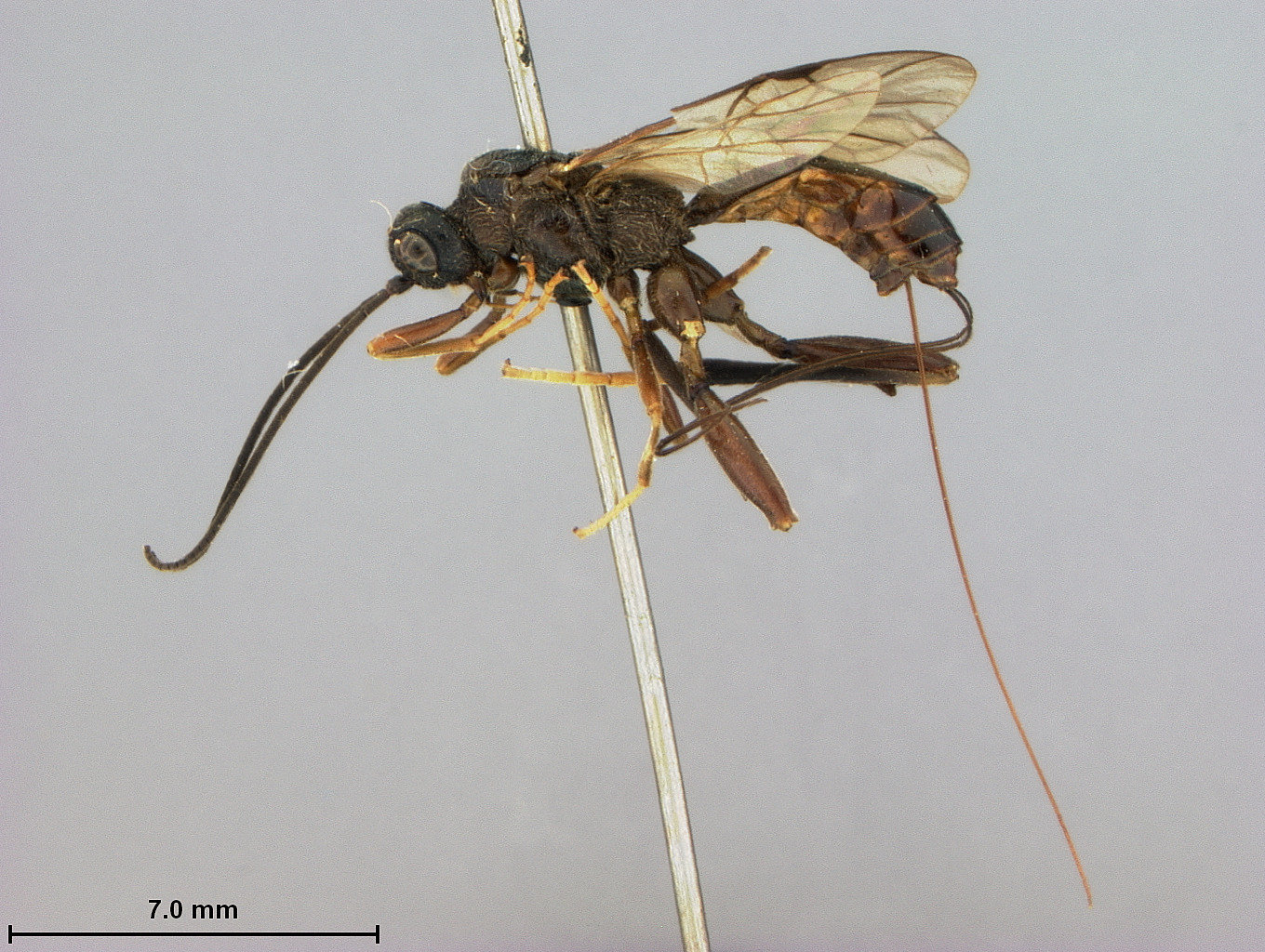
Wroughtonia grandis

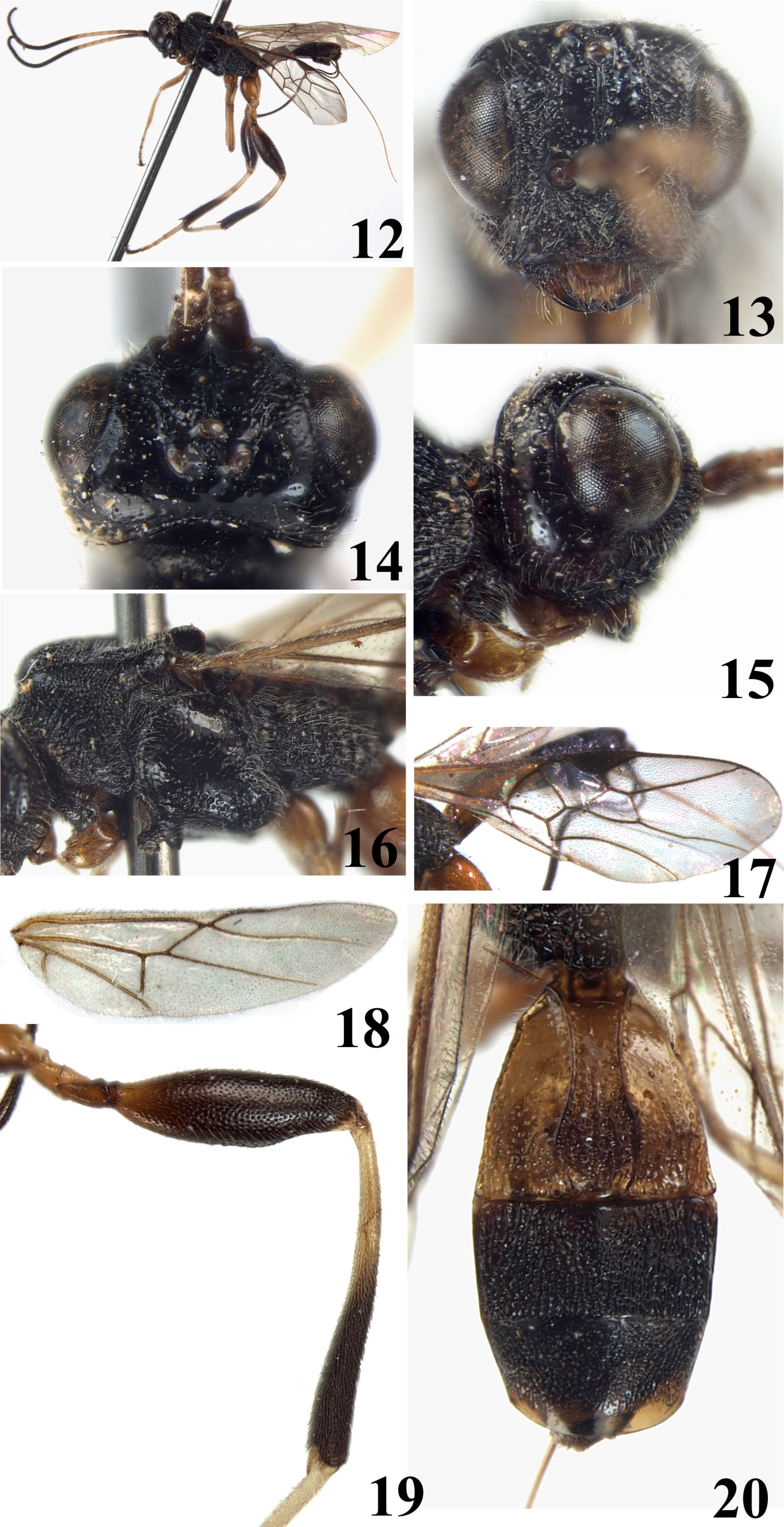
Wroughtonia indica

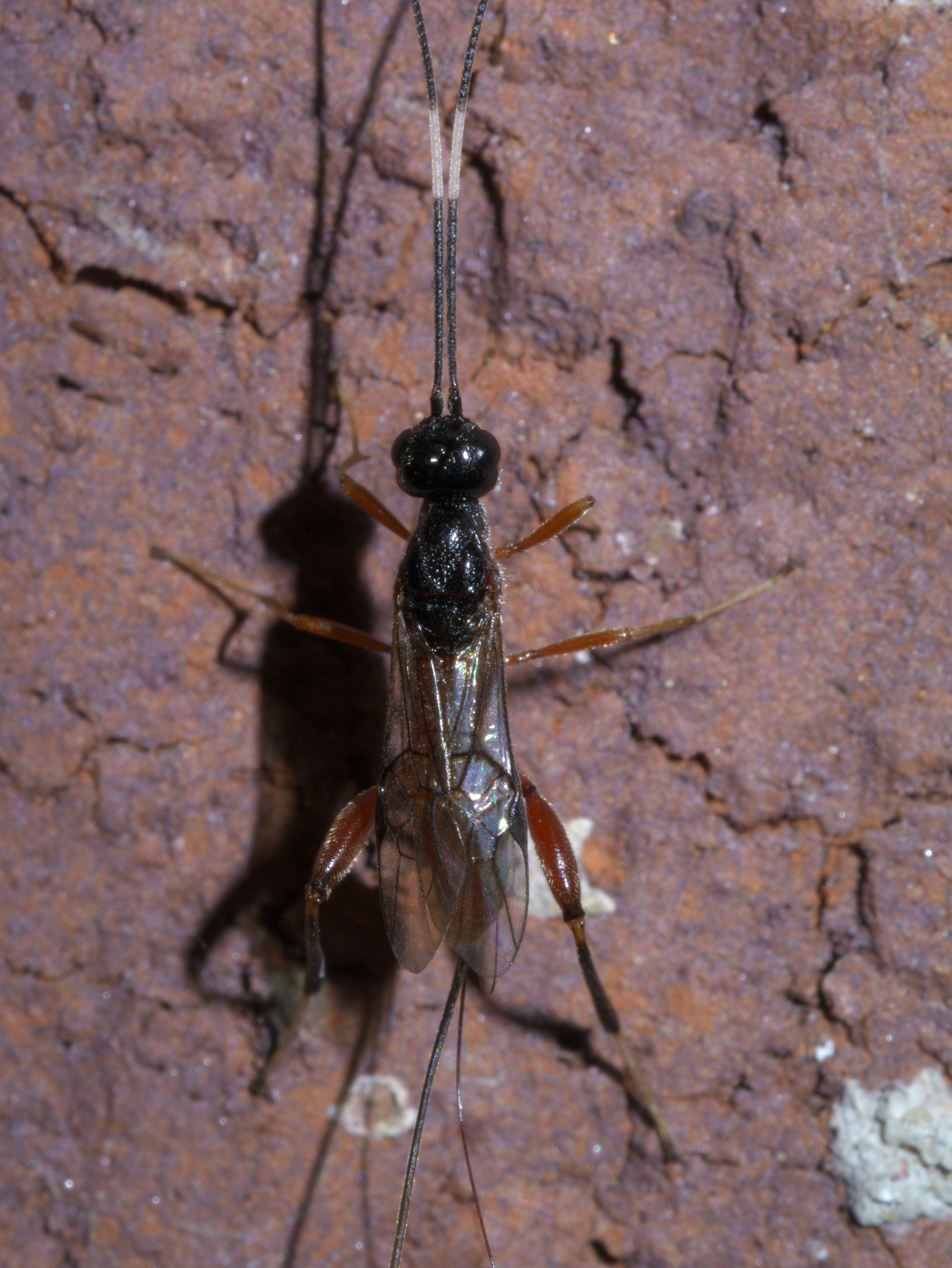
Wroughtonia ligator

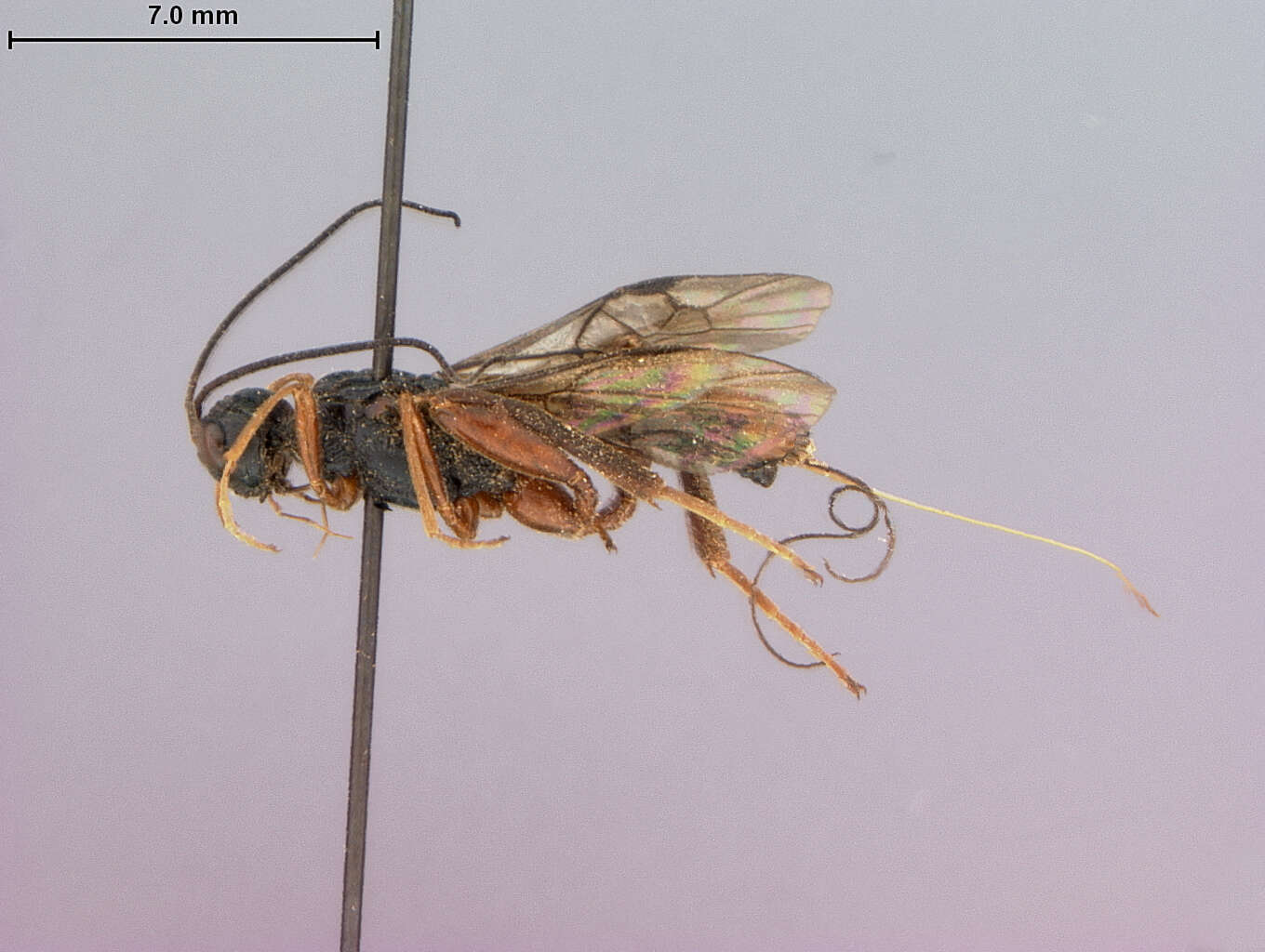
Wroughtonia necydalidis

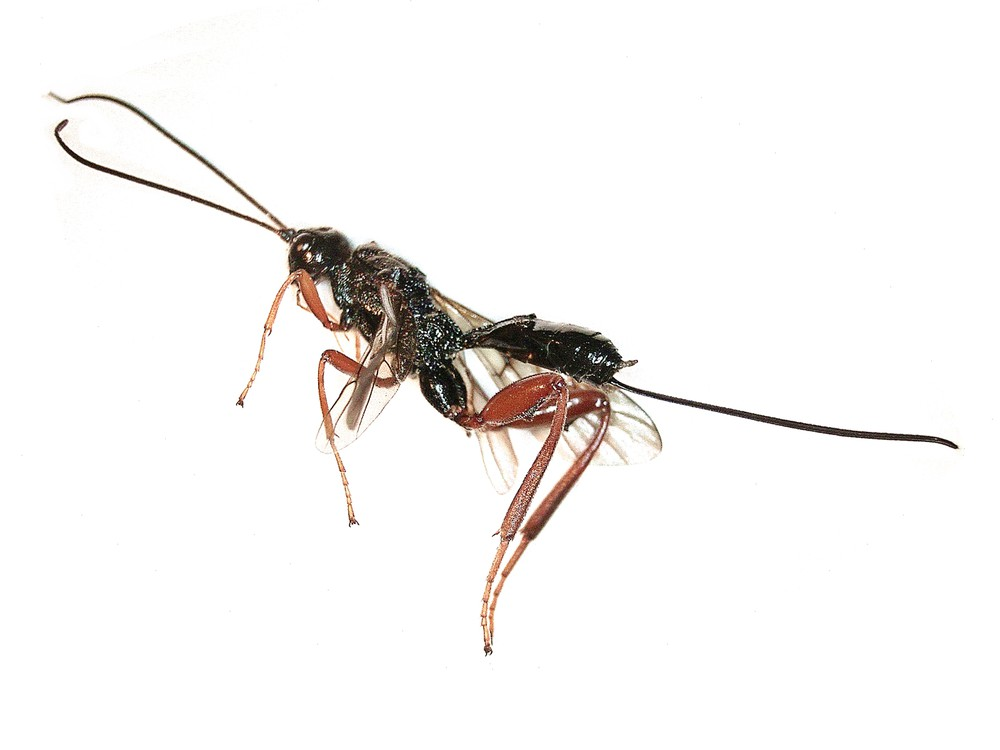
Wroughtonia ruspator

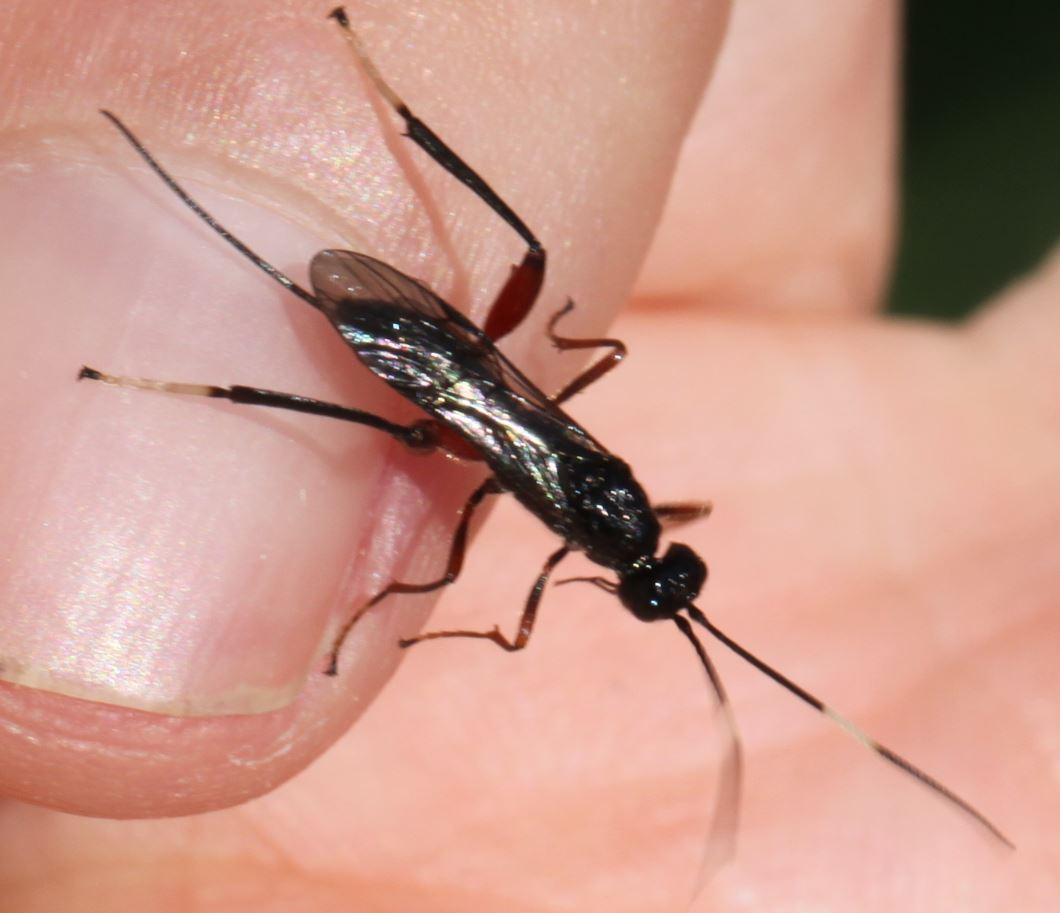
Wroughtonia spinator
