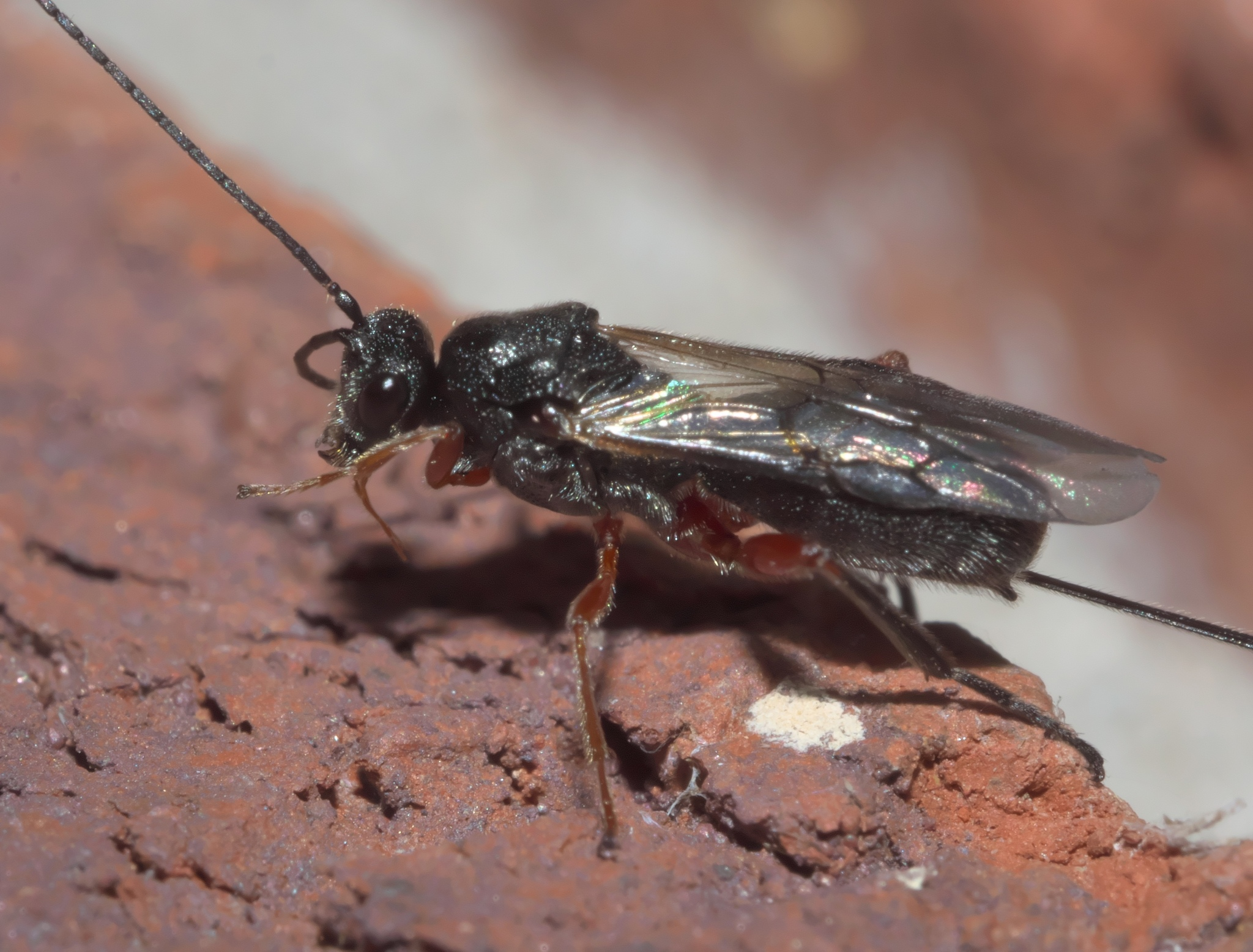
- Urosigalphus, Oklahoma

Scientific classification
- Kingdom: Animalia
- Phylum: Arthropoda
- Class: Insecta
- Order: Hymenoptera
- Family: Braconidae
- Subfamily: Acampsohelconinae
- Genus: Urosigalphus; Ashmead, 1889

= Urosigalphus =

Genus of wasps

Urosigalphus is a genus of wasp in the family Braconidae. There are more than 100 described species in Urosigalphus, found in North, Central, and South America.

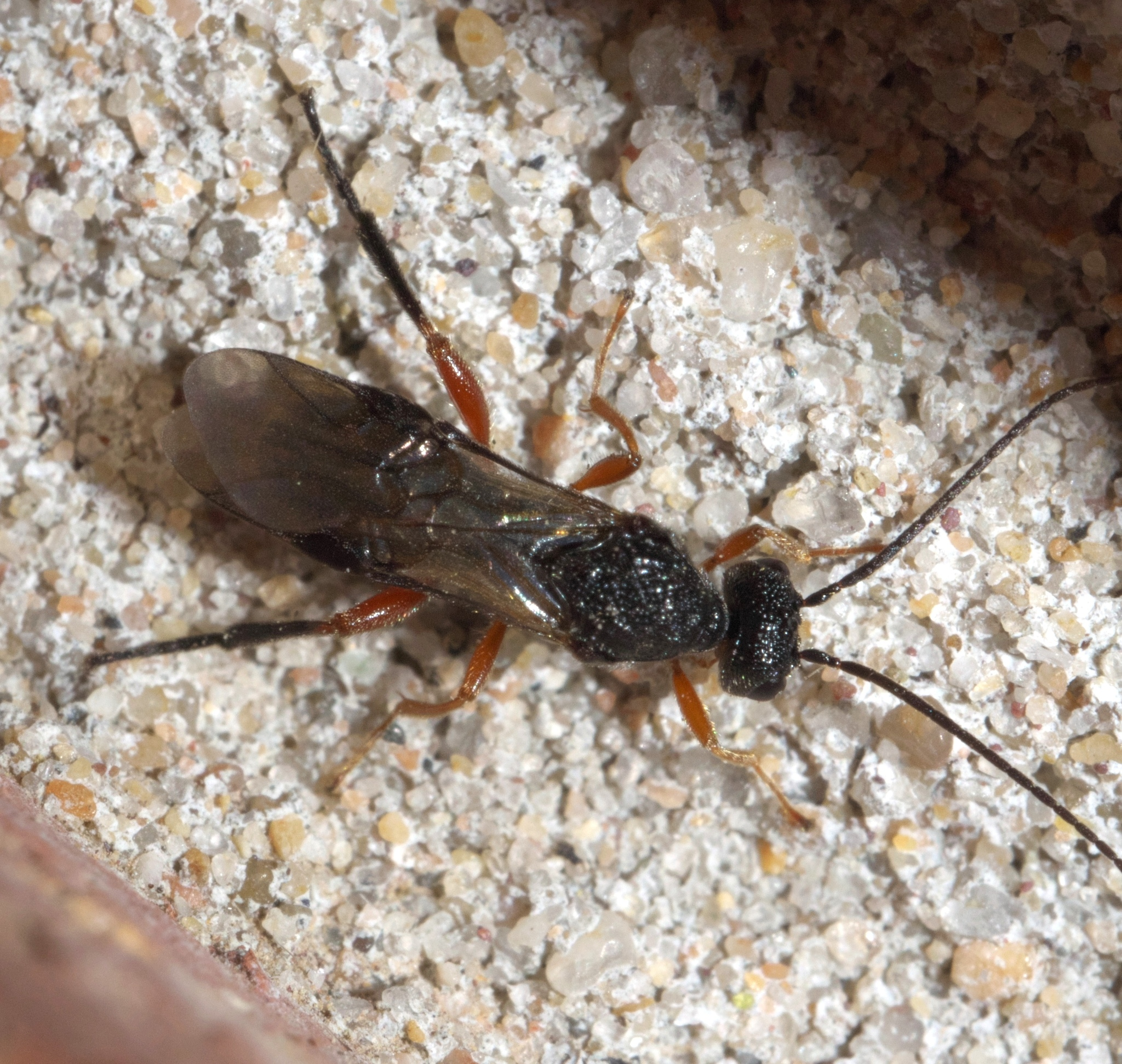
Urosigalphus, Oklahoma

== Species ==
These 109 species belong to the genus Urosigalphus:

- Urosigalphus acutulus Gibson, 1972
- Urosigalphus acutus Gibson, 1974
- Urosigalphus addabruchus Gibson, 1974
- Urosigalphus aeternus Brues, 1910
- Urosigalphus alius Gibson, 1982
- Urosigalphus aliuslongitudinis Arias-Penna
- Urosigalphus amandae Arias-Penna
- Urosigalphus anthonomi Crawford, 1907
- Urosigalphus aquilus Gibson, 1972
- Urosigalphus armatus Ashmead, 1889
- Urosigalphus australis Gibson, 1974
- Urosigalphus avocadoae Gibson, 1972
- Urosigalphus barberi Crawford, 1914
- Urosigalphus bicolor Gibson, 1974
- Urosigalphus bidentatus Gibson, 1974
- Urosigalphus braziliensis Gibson, 1974
- Urosigalphus breviovipositorus Gibson, 1972
- Urosigalphus bruchi Crawford, 1907 (Parasitoid wasp)
- Urosigalphus bruchivorus Crawford, 1914
- Urosigalphus bugabensis (Cameron, 1887)
- Urosigalphus carinaverticis Arias-Penna
- Urosigalphus cautus Gibson, 1974
- Urosigalphus cavusscuti Arias-Penna
- Urosigalphus chalcodermi Wilkinson, 1930
- Urosigalphus clarus Gibson, 1972
- Urosigalphus colombiensis Arias-Penna
- Urosigalphus colordissimilis Arias-Penna
- Urosigalphus confusor Gibson, 1972
- Urosigalphus crassisculptus Cushman, 1922
- Urosigalphus curculionis Gibson, 1972
- Urosigalphus dakotaensis Gibson, 1972
- Urosigalphus diversus Gibson, 1982
- Urosigalphus donnae Gibson, 1972
- Urosigalphus durangoensis Gibson, 1972
- Urosigalphus eulechriopis Cushman, 1926
- Urosigalphus faciescarinae Arias-Penna
- Urosigalphus femoratus Crawford, 1914
- Urosigalphus fimbriaeplanae Arias-Penna
- Urosigalphus flavens Gibson, 1972
- Urosigalphus flexus Gibson, 1982
- Urosigalphus floridaensis Gibson, 1972
- Urosigalphus forbesi Martin, 1956
- Urosigalphus frequens Arias-Penna
- Urosigalphus griseae Gibson, 1972
- Urosigalphus hondurensis Gibson, 1972
- Urosigalphus hubbardi Crawford, 1914
- Urosigalphus ignotus Gibson, 1972
- Urosigalphus inaequalis Arias-Penna
- Urosigalphus iowensis Gibson, 1972
- Urosigalphus islandicus Gibson, 1972
- Urosigalphus macarenaensis Arias-Penna
- Urosigalphus margo Arias-Penna
- Urosigalphus meridianus Gibson, 1982
- Urosigalphus metanotuminsignum Arias-Penna
- Urosigalphus mexicanus Gibson, 1972
- Urosigalphus mimosestes Gibson, 1972
- Urosigalphus monotonus Gibson, 1972
- Urosigalphus monticola Arias-Penna
- Urosigalphus muesebecki Gibson, 1972
- Urosigalphus neoarmatus Gibson, 1972
- Urosigalphus neobruchi Gibson, 1972
- Urosigalphus neomexicanus Crawford, 1914
- Urosigalphus neopunctifrons Gibson, 1972
- Urosigalphus neoschwarzi Gibson, 1972
- Urosigalphus nigrescens Martin, 1956
- Urosigalphus nigripes Crawford, 1914
- Urosigalphus notauliremoti Arias-Penna
- Urosigalphus novissimus Gibson, 1972
- Urosigalphus obscurus Gibson, 1974
- Urosigalphus obsoletus Gibson, 1974
- Urosigalphus ocellivicini Arias-Penna
- Urosigalphus ordoincompositus Arias-Penna
- Urosigalphus ornatus Gibson, 1974
- Urosigalphus otidocephali Cushman, 1922
- Urosigalphus panamaensis Gibson, 1972
- Urosigalphus paraguayensis Gibson, 1974
- Urosigalphus pardus Gibson, 1972
- Urosigalphus porteri Gibson, 1982
- Urosigalphus pseudochelonus Gibson, 1974
- Urosigalphus pullatus Gibson, 1974
- Urosigalphus punctifrons Crawford, 1914
- Urosigalphus robustus Ashmead, 1889
- Urosigalphus rubicarapace Gibson, 1974
- Urosigalphus rubicorpus Gibson, 1974
- Urosigalphus rubidus Gibson, 1972
- Urosigalphus rufiventris (Philippi, 1873)
- Urosigalphus rufus Gibson, 1972
- Urosigalphus rugosocorpus Gibson, 1972
- Urosigalphus rugosus (Cameron, 1904)
- Urosigalphus safflavus Gibson, 1974
- Urosigalphus salsola Gibson, 1972
- Urosigalphus sanguineus Gibson, 1974
- Urosigalphus schwarzi Crawford, 1907
- Urosigalphus sharkeyi Arias-Penna
- Urosigalphus singularis Arias-Penna
- Urosigalphus spinatus Gibson, 1974
- Urosigalphus subtropicus Gibson, 1972
- Urosigalphus surinamensis Gibson, 1982
- Urosigalphus tamaulipas Gibson, 1972
- Urosigalphus taniae Arias-Penna
- Urosigalphus tarsalis (Szepligeti, 1902)
- Urosigalphus tredecimantennae Arias-Penna
- Urosigalphus triacarinae Arias-Penna
- Urosigalphus trinidadensis Gibson, 1974
- Urosigalphus trituberculatus Gibson, 1972
- Urosigalphus tuberculatus Gibson, 1974
- Urosigalphus venezuelaensis Gibson, 1974
- Urosigalphus whitfieldi Arias-Penna
- Urosigalphus yucatanensis Gibson, 1982
