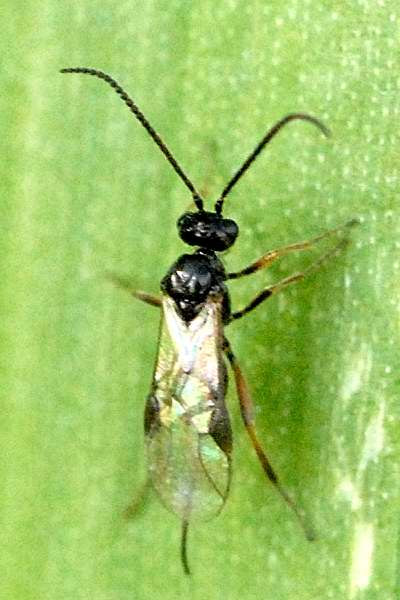
- Eubazus

Scientific classification
- Kingdom: Animalia
- Phylum: Arthropoda
- Clade: Pancrustacea
- Class: Insecta
- Order: Hymenoptera
- Family: Braconidae
- Subfamily: Brachistinae

Tribes
- Blacini; Brachistini; Brulleiini; Diospilini; Tainitermini

= Brachistinae =

Subfamily of wasps

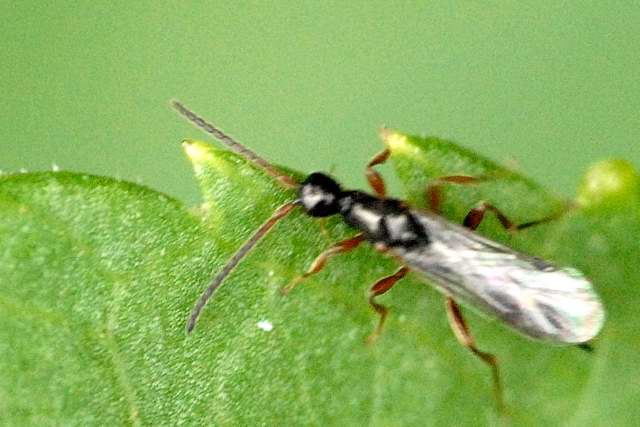
Blacus

Brachistinae is a subfamily of wasp in the family Braconidae.

== Taxonomy and phylogeny ==
The genera of Brachistinae were formerly classified as tribes under the subfamily Helconinae. The tribe Blacini was split into a separate subfamily, Blacinae. Blacinae was subdivided into the tribes Blacini, Blacozonini, Chalaropini, Dyscoletini, Stegnocellini, and Xyeloblacini. The Helconinae tribes Diospilini, Brulleiini and Brachistini were later split into another subfamily, Brachistinae. Phylogenetic studies by Sharanowski et al. in 2011 found the Blacinae and Brachistinae to represent a monophyletic lineage, resulting in the synonymization of Blacinae under Brachistinae. However, further phylogenomic studies by Jasso-Martínez et al. in 2022 found Dyscoletes to be distant and not monophyletic with other Brachistinae so considered it incertae sedis. The authors also noted weaknesses in the phylogenetics of Brachistinae due to genera being omitted.

== Genera ==
The genera of the subfamily Brachistinae include:

=== Tribe Blacini ===
- Apoblacus van Achterberg, 1976
- Blacometeorus Tobias, 1976^{c g}
- Blacus Nees von Esenbeck, 1818^{c g b}
- †Palaeoblacus Statz, 1936

==== Tribe Blacini or Blacozonini ====
- Blacozona van Achterberg, 1976
- Glyptoblacus van Achterberg, 1995
- Grypokeros van Achterberg, 1988

==== Tribe Blacini or Chalaropini ====
- Chalarope van Achterberg, 1988

==== Tribe Blacini, Dyscoletini, or incertae sedis ====
- Dyscoletes Westwood, 1840^{c g}
- Hellenius (wasp) Nees, 1811

==== Tribe Blacini or Stegnocellini ====
- Mesoxiphium van Achterberg, 1976
- Stegnocella van Achterberg, 1976

==== Tribe Blacini or Xyeloblacini ====
- Xyeloblacus van Achterberg, 1997^{c g}

=== Tribe Brachistini ===
- Brachistes Wesmael, 1835
- Dicyrtaspis van Achterberg, 1980
- Eubazus Nees von Esenbeck, 1812^{c g b}
- Foersteria Szépligeti, 1896^{i c g}
- Nealiolus Mason, 1974
- Niteobrachis Aranguren, 1999
- Schizoprymnus Förster, 1862^{c g b}
- Triaspis Haliday, 1838^{c g b}

=== Tribe Brulleiini ===
- Brulleia Szépligeti, 1904^{c g}
- Parabrulleia van Achterberg, 1983^{c g}

=== Tribe Diospilini ===
- Aspicolpus Wesmael, 1838^{c g}
- Aspigonus Wesmael, 1835^{c g}
- Atree Ranjith, van Achterberg & Priyadarsanan, 2022
- Depelbus Papp, 1993
- Diospilus Haliday, 1833^{c g b}
- Nipponocolpus Belokobylskij & Fujie, 2017
- Schauinslandia Ashmead, 1900
- Taphaeus Wesmael, 1835^{c g}
- Topaldios Papp, 1995
- Vadumasonium Kammerer, 2006^{c g}

=== Tribe Tainitermini ===
- Tainiterma van Achterberg & Shaw, 2001

Data sources: i = ITIS, c = Catalogue of Life, g = GBIF, b = Bugguide.net
