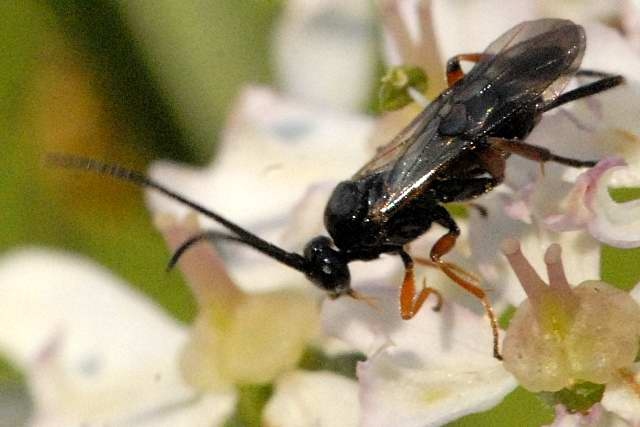
- Triaspis luteipes

Scientific classification
- Kingdom: Animalia
- Phylum: Arthropoda
- Class: Insecta
- Order: Hymenoptera
- Family: Braconidae
- Subfamily: Brachistinae
- Genus: Triaspis; Haliday, 1838

= Triaspis (wasp) =

Genus of wasps

Triaspis is a genus of wasp in the family Braconidae. There are at least 110 described species in Triaspis.

== See also ==
- List of Triaspis species
