= Diospilus =

Scientific classification
- Domain: Eukaryota
- Kingdom: Animalia
- Phylum: Arthropoda
- Class: Insecta
- Order: Hymenoptera
- Family: Braconidae
- Genus: Diospilus; Haliday, 1833

Genus of wasps

Diospilus is a genus of insects belonging to the family Braconidae. They more specifically belong to the subfamily Brachistinae.

The genus has cosmopolitan distribution.

Species:

- Diospilus abbreviator (Schiodte, 1839)
- Diospilus acourti Cockerell, 1921
- Diospilus adustior Papp, 2012
- Diospilus assimulatus Papp, 2013
- Diospilus belokobylskiji Beyarslan, 2008
- Diospilus capito (Nees, 1834)
- Diospilus curticaudis Gahan, 1927
- Diospilus sisyphus Sánchez, Figueroa and Sharkey 2012
- Diospilus sulphureus Papp, 2012
