= Jan Šnoflák =

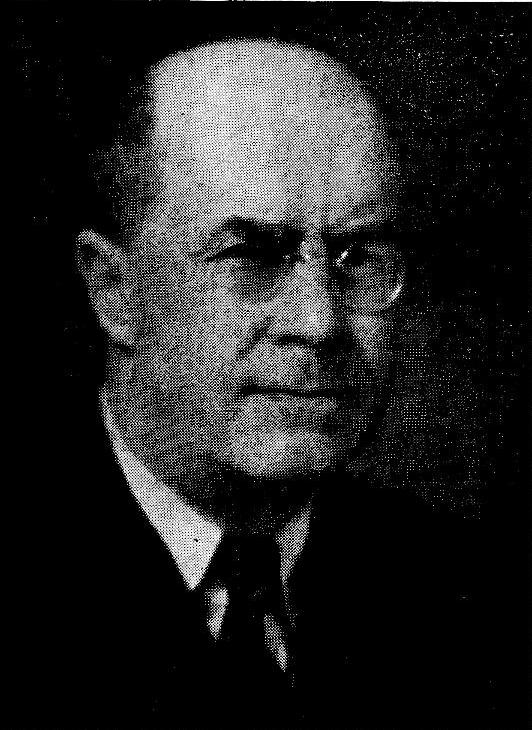
Jan Šnoflák's portrait in the Entomologické listy magazine

Jan Šnoflák (4 May 1891 – 9 April 1954) was a Czech entomologist and school teacher. He studied the Hymenoptera of the Moravian region. He specialized on the Sphecidae, Braconidae, and the Apidae and Vespoidea of the Mohelenská hadcová step ('Mohelno serpentine steppe').

Šnoflák was born in Římov near Třebíč, Austria-Hungary. He became interested in nature through his mother who was a mushroom collector. He was influenced by the malacologist Josef Uličný and the botanist Rudolf Dvořák. After studies at the Třebíč gymnasium he went to Charles University to study natural history. World War I interrupted his studies and he served on the front for six years and he returned to finish his studies only in 1920. He then worked in Hodonín and later in Znojmo as a teacher. When World War II broke out with the occupation of Sudetenland, he escaped to Lipník nad Bečvou and then taught at Brno at the teacher's institute and then taught Russian at the gymnasium in Brno-Žabovřesky. In 1938 he attended the entomological congress and after that he concentrated on entomological research in collaboration with František Gregor, especially on the Hymenoptera. He worked at the Agricultural Research Institute in Brno. His collection of insects with nearly 50,000 specimens is held at the Moravské zemské muzeum in Brno. He published a monograph on the Sphecidae of Czechoslovakia in 1948 in collaboration with Vilém Zavadil (1876–1953). He also studied the genera Spilomena, Ammoplanus, Ammophila, Phanerotoma, Phanerotomella, and Chelonus.

He was a member of the Moravian-Silesian Academy of Natural Sciences and the Czechoslovak Entomological Society.
