= Kammeri =

Village in Estonia

- village
- Location in Estonia
- Coordinates: 58°10′28″N 26°38′18″E
- Country: Estonia
- County: Tartu County
- Municipality: Kambja Parish
- First mentioned: 16th century

Population (01.01.2000)
  - Total: 92

Kammeri is a village in Kambja Parish, Tartu County in southern Estonia, located about 23 km south of the city of Tartu. In 2000 Kammeri had a population of 92.

Kammeri Manor (German: Gut Dückershof) was first mentioned in the middle of the 16th century, when it belonged to the Dückers. Other owners include the Fersens, Rennenkampffs, Helmersens and Stadens. After the dispossession in 1919 the manor building was used as a school. The building was demolished in 2009 to build a modern schoolhouse.

Kammeri village school was established in 1765.

Baltic German geologist Gregor von Helmersen (1803–1885) was born in Kammeri Manor. Also the German diplomat Berndt von Staden (de) (born 1919) spent his childhood in the manor.
