= Louis Sébastien Tredern de Lézérec =

French physician and embryologist (1780–1818)

Louis Sébastien Marie de Tredern de Lézérec (14 September 1780 – 8 November 1818) was a French biologist, physician, and pioneer embryologist who examined the growth of the chicken embryo. His 1808 medical dissertation Dissertatio Inauguralis Medica Sistens Ovi Avium Historiae et Incubationis Prodromum (preliminary contribution to the history of the avian egg and its incubation) on the embryo of the chick was examined by Karl Ernst von Baer and is considered a landmark in the history of vertebrate embryology.

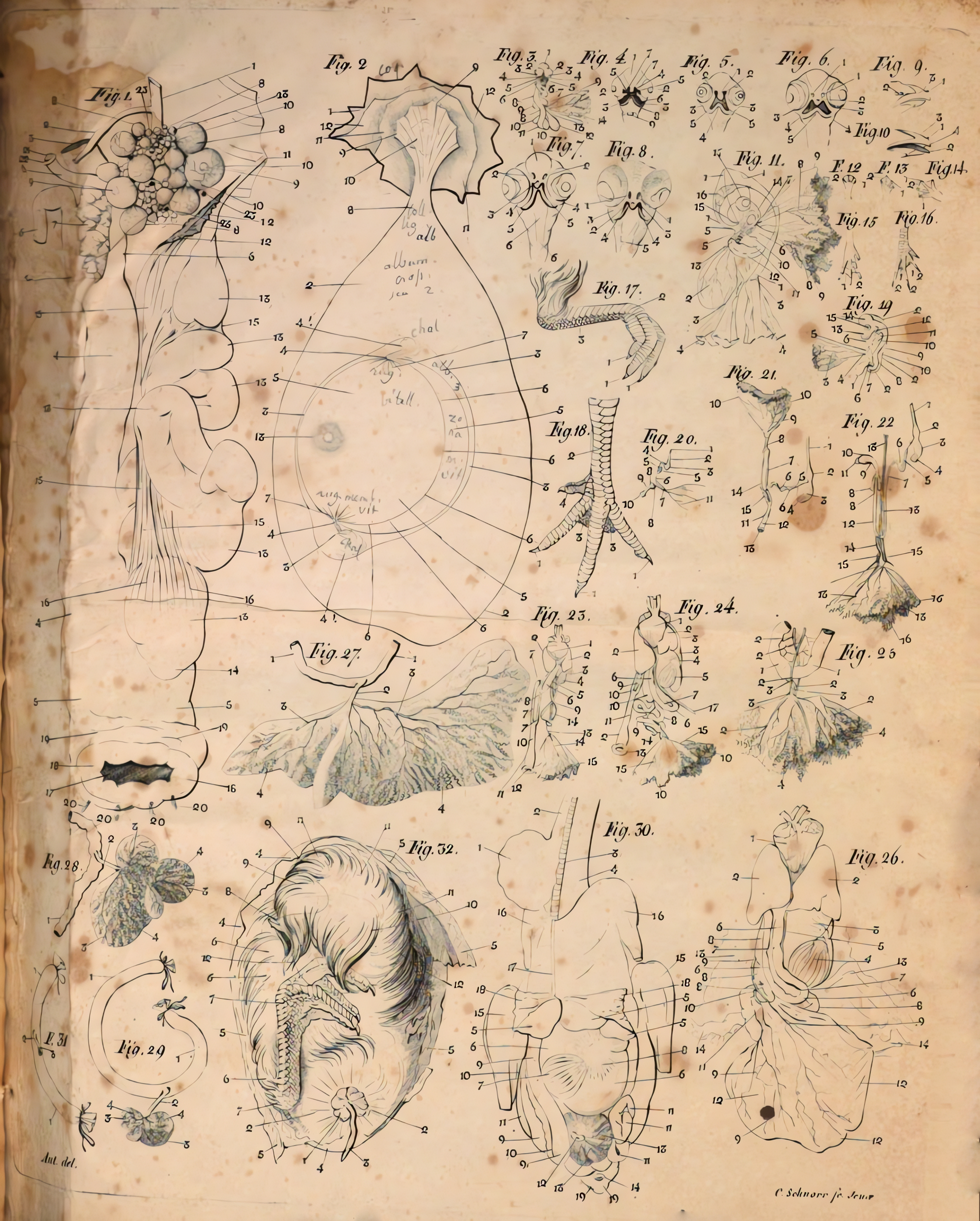
Illustration of chick embryo and development

== Life and work ==
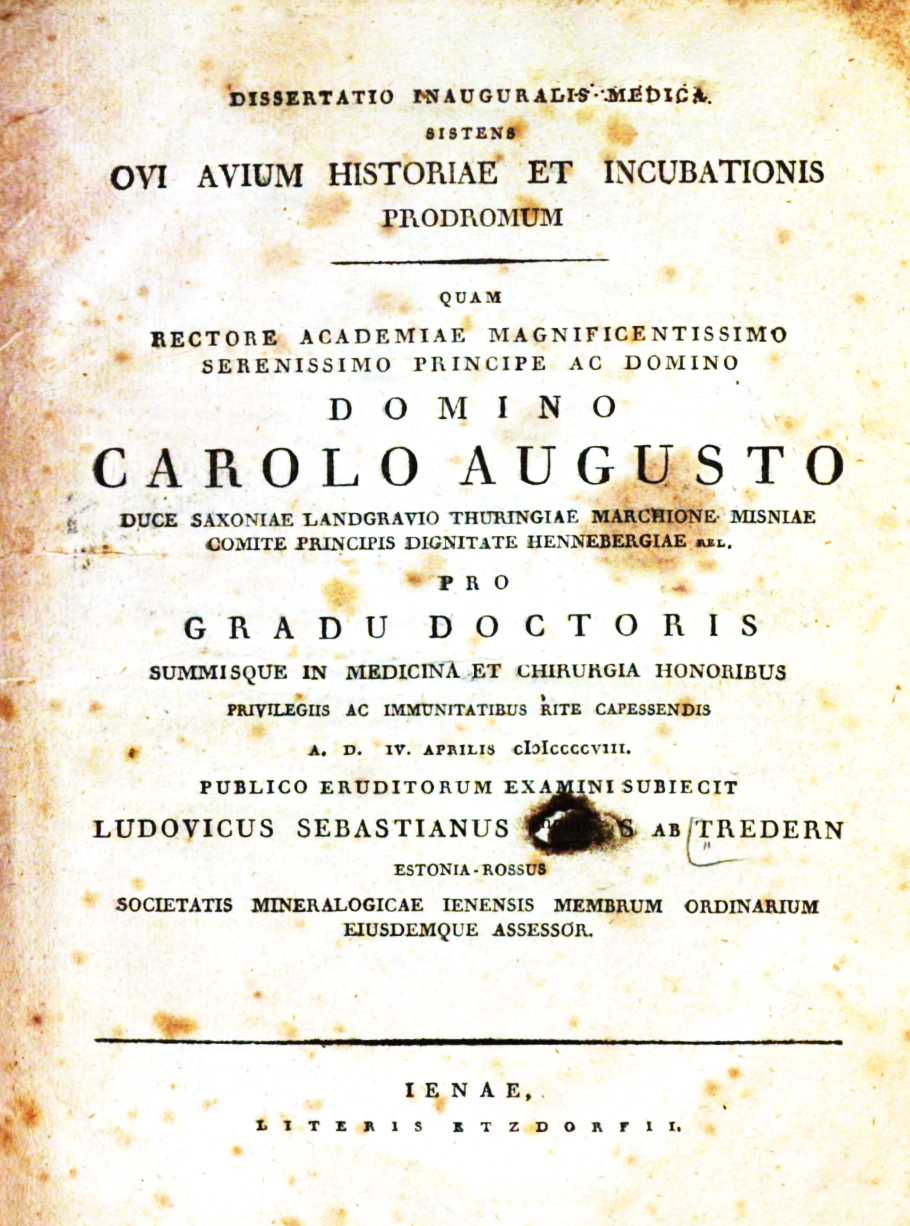
Title page of thesis

Tredern was born in Brest, Brittany, where his father Jean Louis (1742–1807) had been a French Imperial navy captain.René Laennec was a second cousin on his father's side while Pierre Marie Sébastien Bigot de Morogues was a maternal cousin who later became a geologist and member of the Jena Academy. Shortly after the French Revolution, the family moved to St. Petersburg in 1796 and Tredern joined as a midshipman in Tallinn in 1797 aboard a Russian battleship, The Pimen. He apparently took an interest in anatomy and conducted dissections in his cabin. In 1801 the family returned to France where the senior Tredern died at Quimper. Tredern studied at the Parisian Academy for painting and sculpture declaring himself to be a Russian born in Reval (Tallinn) and studied under the painter Henri Regnault around 1803. Tredern then enrolled for medical studies initially at the Paris School of Medicine but later at the University of Würzburg in 1804 and studied under Ignaz Döllinger. In 1807 he went to the University of Göttingen where he wrote a thesis, with support from Johann Friedrich Blumenbach, on the chick embryo for his dissertation which was finally submitted to Jena University (1808), possibly through the influence of Lorenz Oken. Tredern also spent some time at Dreissigacker in the school of forestry where he may have collaborated with Johann Matthäus Bechstein (1757–1822) who was interested in bird anatomy and had a lot of knowledge on artificial incubation of eggs. Karl Ernst von Baer found Tredern's thesis and was so impressed by the work that he tried to learn about its author. He had assumed that Tredern was Estonian until he was sent a birth register from Brest in 1873. Tredern was a correspondent of the Société des Sciences physiques, médicales et d’agriculture d’Orléans living around 1810 in Paris. Tredern worked on a second dissertation in medicine in 1811 which was submitted to the Paris medical school. This was about hygiene and the organization and building of hospitals. He became a librarian at the Mazarin Library in Paris in 1913. He was also a sworn expert physician for the Imperial Court of Justice from 1813. In 1817 he went to the Guadeloupe Island possibly to establish a hospital and here he died from yellow fever.

Tredern examined the growth of the chick head, the beak and the digits growing from a limb bud. He examined the sequence of development and illustrated his findings in detail. He especially considered the growth of the wing, legs and beak. His thesis introduced the author as being an Estonian-Russian. He made use of artificial incubation in earthen vessels filled with sand and warmed.
