= Sonanus =

Scientific classification
- Kingdom: Animalia
- Phylum: Arthropoda
- Class: Insecta
- Order: Hymenoptera
- Family: Braconidae
- Subfamily: Doryctinae
- Tribe: Doryctini
- Genus: Sonanus; Belokobylskij & Konishi, 2001

Type species
- Sonanus senzuensis Belokobylskij & Konishi, 2001

Diversity
- 5

Genus of wasps

Sonanus is a genus of parasitoid wasps in the Doryctini tribe of the subfamily Doryctinae in the family Braconidae. It was first described in 2001 by the Russian entomologist, Sergey A. Belokobylskij, and the Japanese entomologist, Kazuhiko Konishi.

== Species ==
Species listed by GBIF are:

- Sonanus senzuensis Belokobylskij & Konishi, 2001
- Sonanus indicus Belokobylskij, 2005
- Sonanus bamagaus Belokobylskij, Iqbal & Austin, 2004
- Sonanus chinensis Belokobylskij & Chen, 2005
- Sonanus tselikhae Belokobylskij & Ku, 2023
