= Vasily Helmersen =

Baltic-German artist

Wilhelm von Helmersen
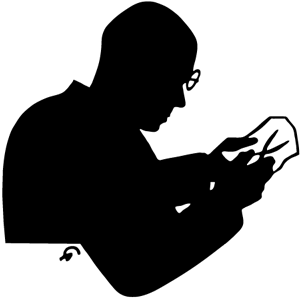
- Wilhelm von Helmersen, a portrait by V.A. Svitalsky, Solovki prison camp, 1932
- Born: August 23, 1873
- Died: 9 December 1937 (aged 64); Sandarmokh, Karelian ASSR, Russian SFSR, Soviet Union
- Other names: Vassily Gelmersen
- Known for: Silhouette art
- Notable work: Illustrations to Eugene Onegin

Wilhelm Paul Christian Nikolai von Helmersen (Russian: Василий Васильевич Гельмерсен, tr. Vasiliy Vasil’evich Gel’mersen; August 23, 1873 – December 9, 1937) was a Baltic German artist and book illustrator. He is known mostly for his illustrations to Eugene Onegin.

== Biography ==
Wilhelm von Helmersen was born in 1873 into the Baltic German noble Helmersen family, and was the grand nephew of the genealogist Gregor von Helmersen. In 1899 he graduated from the Saint Petersburg University and began his career in the Ministry of the Imperial Court. By 1908, he had risen to a Court Councilor and received the rank of Chamber Junker. However, in 1914, he quit the Ministry to work as an assistant director in the Palace Library of Nicholas II.

Since 1900, Helmersen was known for his silhouette artworks. He created illustrations to Eugene Onegin, War and Peace, Dead Souls, A Hero of Our Time, The Shot. His works were included in the exhibitions at the Imperial Academy of Arts.

After the Revolution, Helmersen worked in the State Russian Museum and in the Russian Academy of Sciences. In 1930, he was arrested as a result of a purge in the state institutions and sent to one of the Gulag prison camps. In 1937, he was executed like many other victims of the Great Purge.

== Eugene Onegin ==
Helmersen's most famous work was a series of 100 illustrations to Eugene Onegin. One of them was published in Vengerov's six-volume edition of Pushkin's works.

In 1910s Nikolay Lerner intended to publish an edition of Eugene Onegin illustrated by Helmersen, but this was not realized (most likely because of the World War and the Revolution).

In the Soviet period, another edition of Onegin with Helmersen's illustrations was prepared in the State Literary Museum to commemorate the 100th anniversary of Pushkin's death, but it was also canceled. The illustrations, however, were displayed in the State Historical Museum during the Pushkin Anniversary Exhibition in 1937.

== Gallery ==
From the illustrations to Eugene Onegin
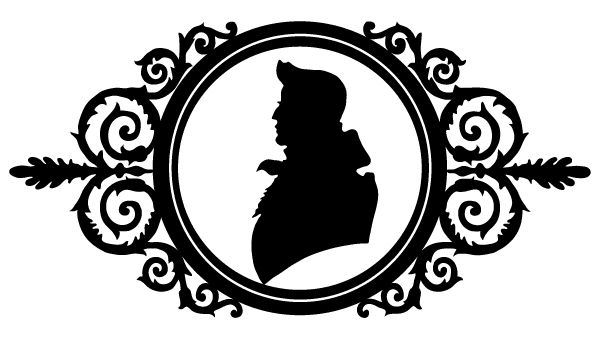
Eugene Onegin

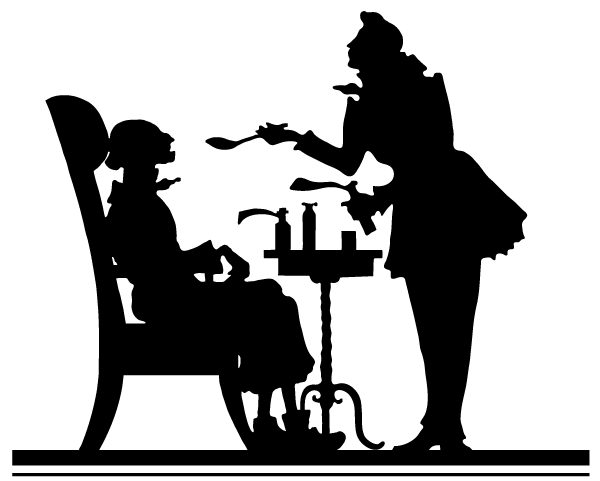
Onegin and his uncle

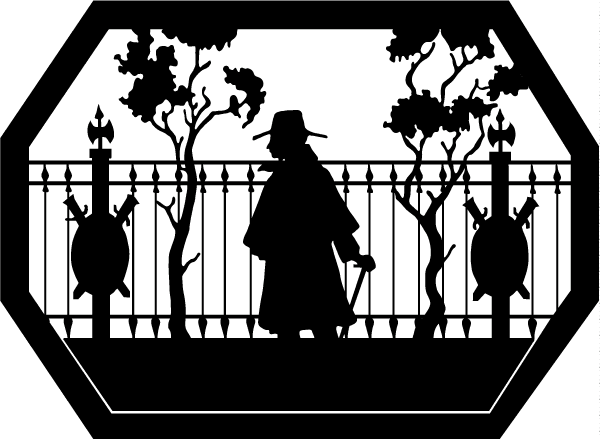
Pushkin

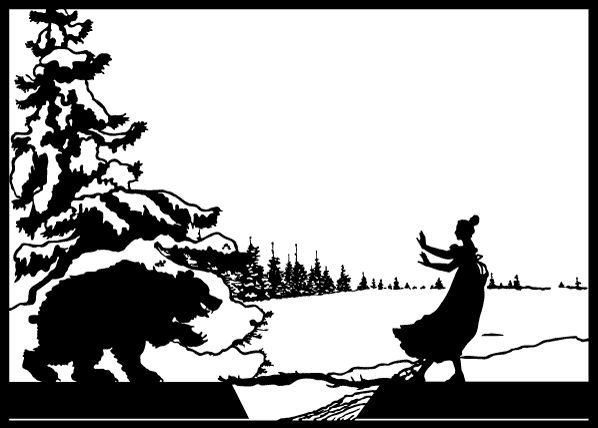
Tatiana's dream

== See also ==
- List of Baltic German artists
