= Sonanus senzuensis =

Scientific classification
- Kingdom: Animalia
- Phylum: Arthropoda
- Clade: Pancrustacea
- Class: Insecta
- Order: Hymenoptera
- Family: Braconidae
- Subfamily: Doryctinae
- Tribe: Doryctini
- Genus: Sonanus
- Species: S. senzuensis

Binomial name
- Sonanus senzuensis Belokobylskij & Konishi, 2001

Species of wasps

Sonanus senzuensis is a species of parasitoid wasp in the Doryctini tribe of the subfamily Doryctinae in the family Braconidae. It was first described in 2001 by the Russian entomologist, Sergey A. Belokobylskij, and the Japanese entomologist, Kazuhiko Konishi.
