= Baer Museum =

Museum in Tartu, Estonia

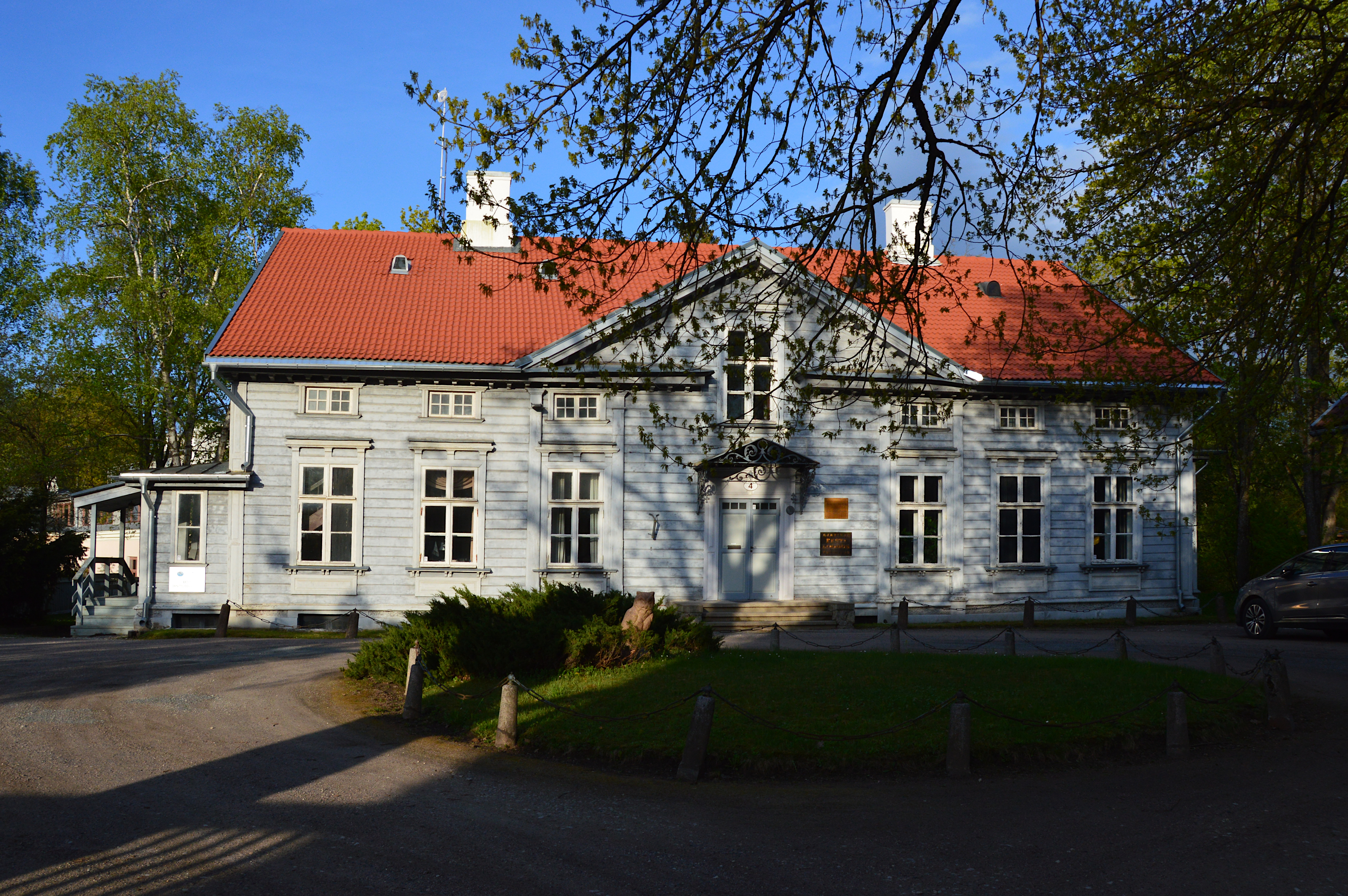
- Baer's House in 2022

The Baer Museum is a museum located at Veski 4, Tartu, opened in 1976. The museum exhibits materials related to the life and scientific work of Karl Ernst von Baer, who lived in this house during the final years of his life. The Baer Museum is part of the Estonian University of Life Sciences, having been transferred to the university following the merger of the Institute of Zoology and Botany with the university.

Between 1864 and 1867, the house was also home to Ludwig Schwabe, director of the University of Tartu Art Museum and a professor of aesthetics and art history.

The Baer Museum was established on the initiative of Eerik Kumari. In 1965, Baer researcher Yevgeny Pavlovsky visited Tartu and expressed surprise at the city's inactivity regarding the legacy of the great scientist and the fact that his house had not yet been turned into a museum.

The editorial office of the magazine Eesti Loodus is also located in this house.

== Architecture ==
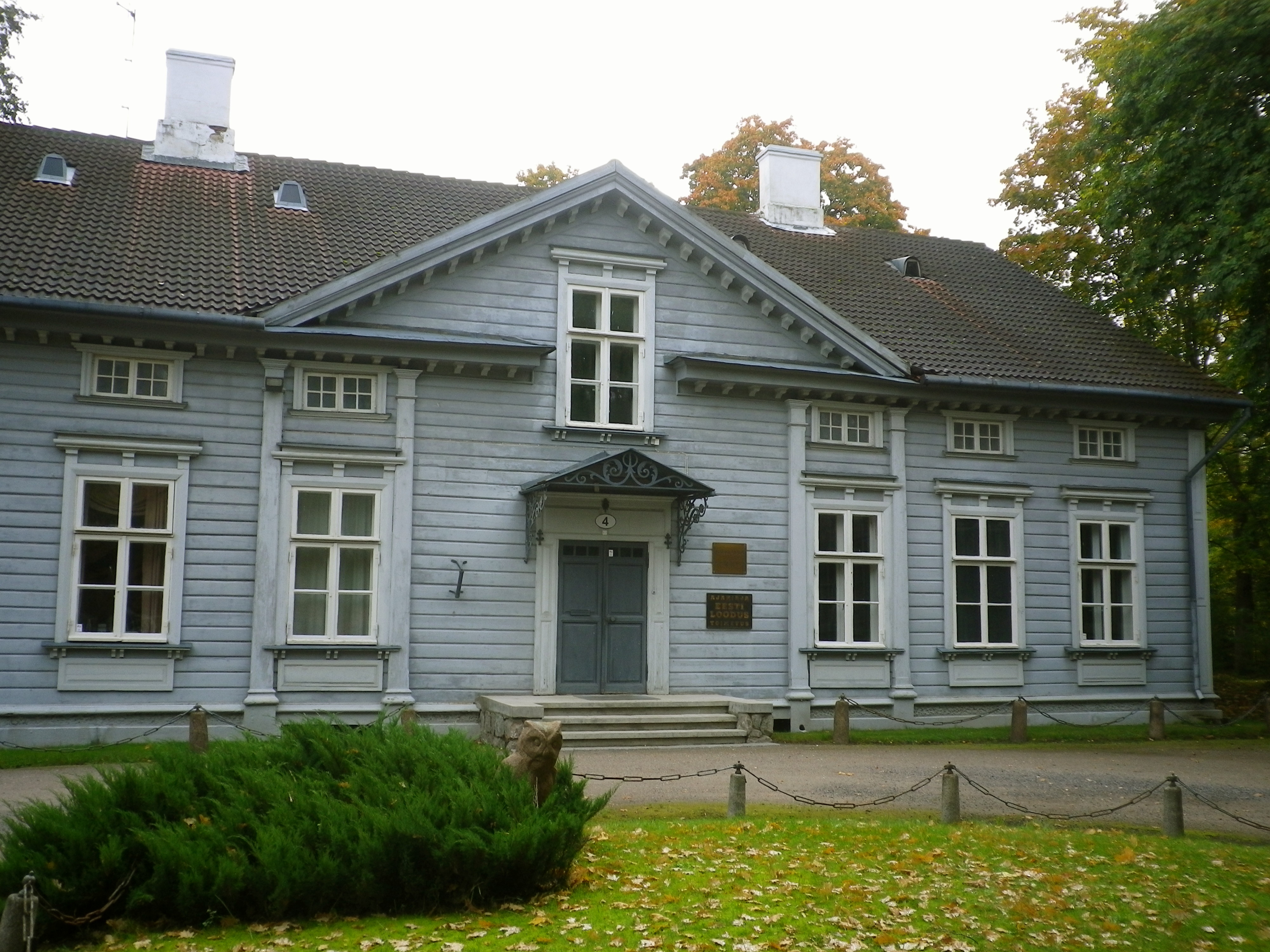
The Baer Museum in 2011

When the house was built, it was located on a plot owned by the University of Tartu and was one of the first buildings in its area, beyond which began the fields of the Tähevere Manor. Due to its elevated location, the balcony provided a broad view of the ruins of the Tartu Cathedral.

In front of the house is a circular driveway, a motif borrowed from manor architecture, flanked by auxiliary buildings: on one side, a granary, carriage shed, and stable, and on the other, a woodshed.

The architect of the house is believed to be Karl Rathaus, although the original plans have not survived. The Baer's House was completed in 1861 and is one of the few remaining single-story wooden houses in the late classicist style. The house is single-story with a large attic apartment, a mezzanine floor, and a balcony.

The building has a rectangular floor plan, with a simple, symmetrical façade featuring a central risalite, whose gable is decorated with a dentil cornice. Similar dentil decorations are found on the rear gable and beneath the eaves. The mezzanine floor has a row of double-pane windows. The main entrance is approached via a four-step staircase. Originally, there were six pilasters, but today only four remain (the two closest to the portal are missing). The corner lesenes with decorative panels are characteristic of the neo-Renaissance. Earlier eight-pane windows have been replaced with six-pane ones, framed by decorative wooden casings. The dormer window was later extended downward into the gable area and also converted to a six-pane style (originally four-pane). Decorative details such as diamond-shaped and rectangular motifs between the windows, as well as the transom above the portal, have been removed. On the garden side, there is a roofed area supported by four columns, forming an open balcony.
