= Lasila =

Village in Estonia

Coordinates: 59°15′N 26°13′E

- Village
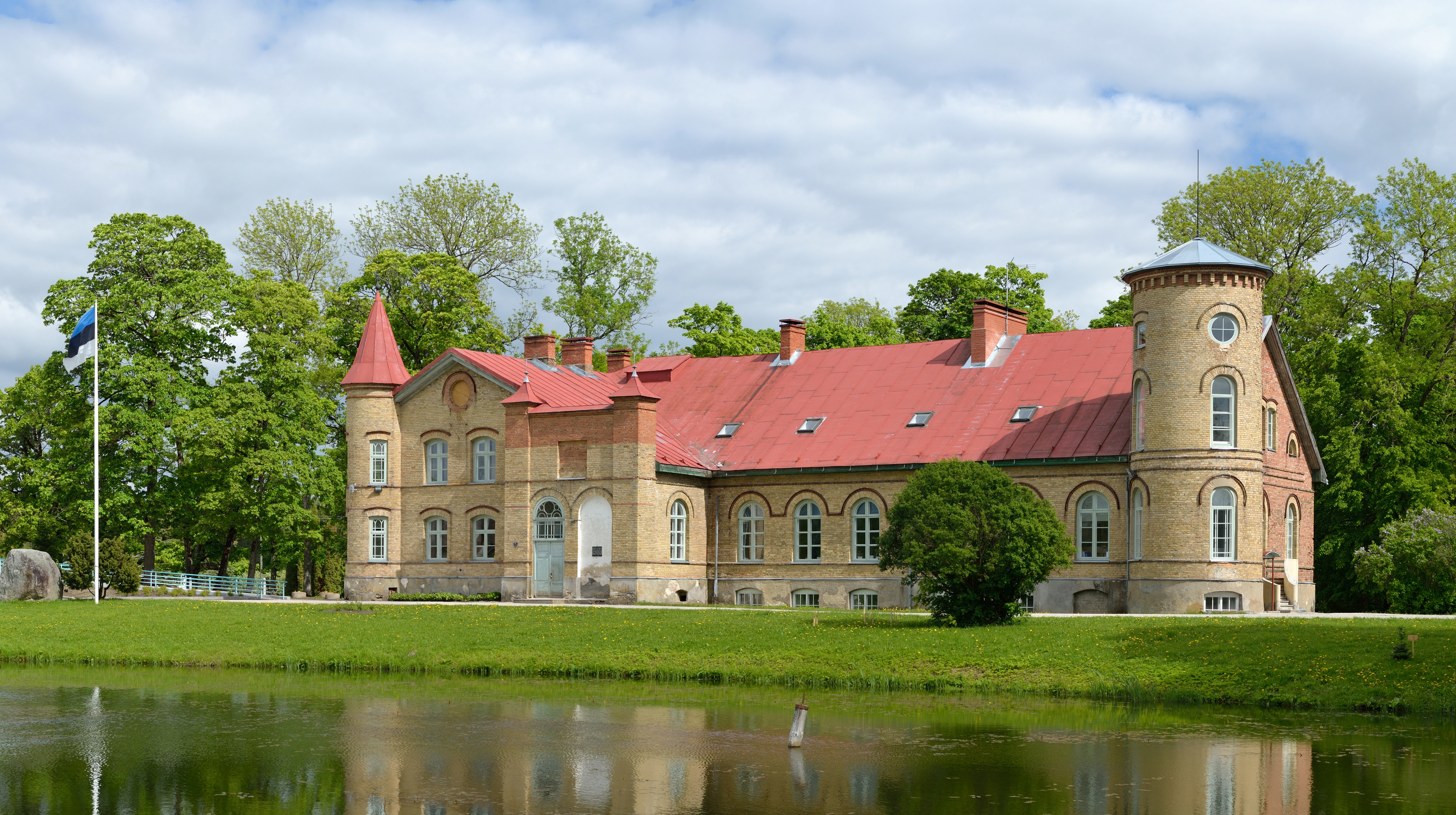
- Lasila manor
- Interactive map of Lasila
- Country: Estonia
- County: Lääne-Viru County
- Parish: Rakvere Parish
- Time zone: UTC+2 (EET)
  - Summer (DST): UTC+3 (EEST)

Lasila is a village in Rakvere Parish, Lääne-Viru County, in northeastern Estonia.

== Lasila manor ==
Lasila estate dates from the end of the 17th century. The current building was erected in 1862 in a romantic, neo-Gothic style. The interiors were restored in 1976. Embryologist Karl Ernst von Baer spent his early childhood at the manor house, which belonged to his paternal uncle, and a monument commemorating him stands in front of the building. Today, the manor is used as a school.

=== See also ===
- List of palaces and manor houses in Estonia
