= Carriage shed =

A carriage shed may refer to:

- A carriage shed (rail), an undercover facility for storing, maintaining, and preparing passenger rail vehicles
- An outbuilding used for the storage of horse-drawn road vehicles
