= Karl Ernst von Baer =

Baltic German scientist (1792–1876)

Ritter Karl Ernst von Baer ForMemRS
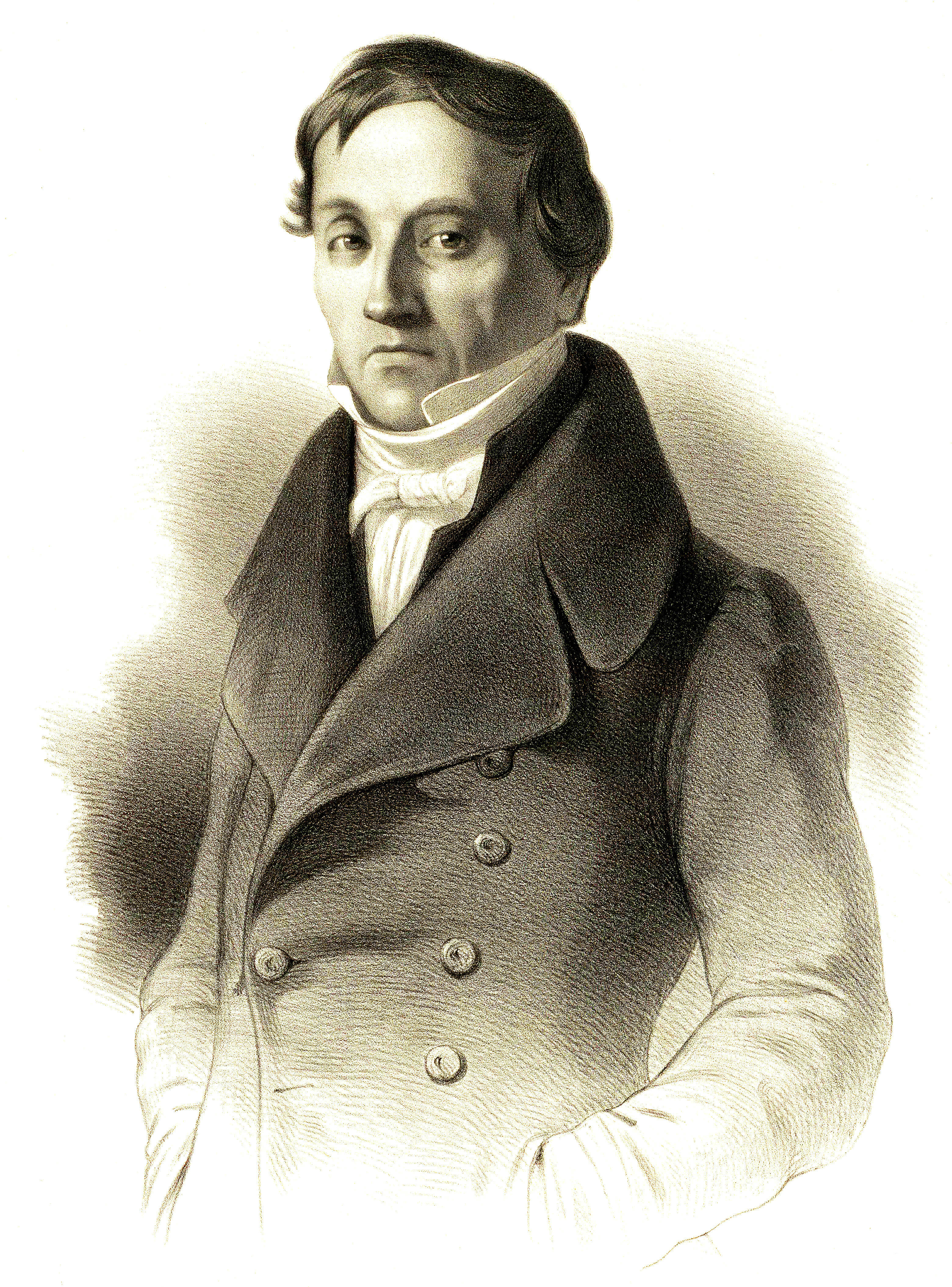
- Born: 28 February [O.S. 17 February] 1792; Piep, Jerwen County, Governorate of Estonia, Russian Empire (now Estonia)
- Died: 28 November [O.S. 16 November] 1876 (aged 84); Dorpat, Livonia Governorate, Russian Empire (now Estonia)
- Citizenship: Russian Empire
- Education: Imperial University of Dorpat
- Known for: The discovery of the mammal egg cell; Exploring European Russia and Scandinavia; von Baer's laws; Baer–Babinet law
- Scientific career
- Fields: Biology, embryology, geology, meteorology, geography
- Workplaces: Imperial University of Dorpat, University of Königsberg, Russian Academy of Sciences, Russian Geographical Society

Karl Ernst Ritter von Baer Edler von Huthorn (Russian: Карл Макси́мович Бэр; 28 February [O.S. 17 February] 1792 – 28 November [O.S. 16 November] 1876) was a Baltic German scientist and explorer. Baer was a naturalist, biologist, geologist, meteorologist, geographer, and is considered a, or the, founding father of embryology. He was a member of the Russian Academy of Sciences, a co-founder of the Russian Geographical Society, and the first president of the Russian Entomological Society, making him one of the most distinguished Baltic German scientists.

== Life ==
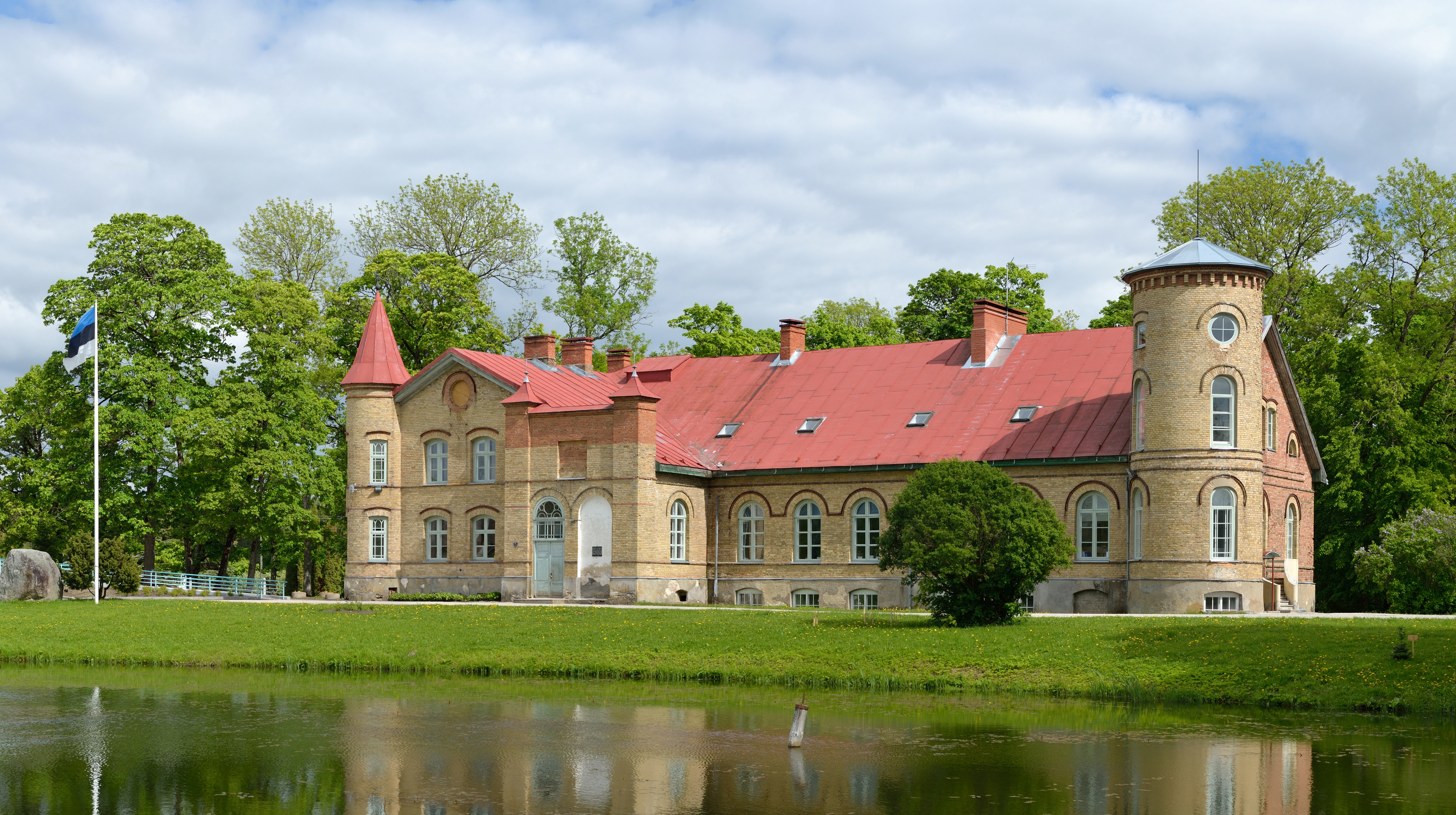
Lasila manor, Estonia, where von Baer spent his early childhood

Karl Ernst von Baer was born into the Baltic German noble Baer family (et) in the Piep Manor (et), Jerwen County, Governorate of Estonia (in present-day Lääne-Viru County, Estonia), as a knight by birthright. His patrilineal ancestors were of Westphalian origin and originated in Osnabrück. He spent his early childhood at Lasila manor, Estonia. He was educated at the Knight and Cathedral School in Reval (Tallinn) and the Imperial University of Dorpat (Tartu). In 1812, during his tenure at the university, he was sent to Riga to aid the city after Napoleon's armies had laid siege to it. As he attempted to help the sick and wounded, he realised that his education at Dorpat had been inadequate, and upon his graduation, he notified his father that he would need to go abroad to "finish" his education. In his autobiography, his discontent with his education at Dorpat inspired him to write a lengthy appraisal of education in general, a summary that dominated the content of the book. After leaving Tartu, he continued his education in Berlin, Vienna, and Würzburg, where Ignaz Döllinger introduced him to the new field of embryology.

In 1817, he became a professor at Königsberg University and full professor of zoology in 1821, and of anatomy in 1826. In 1829, he taught briefly in St Petersburg, but returned to Königsberg (Kaliningrad). In 1834, Baer moved back to St Petersburg and joined the St Petersburg Academy of Sciences, first in zoology (1834–46) and then in comparative anatomy and physiology (1846–62). His interests while there were anatomy, ichthyology, ethnography, anthropology, and geography. While embryology had kept his attention in Königsberg, then in Russia von Baer engaged in a great deal of field research, including the exploration of the island Novaya Zemlya. The last years of his life (1867–76) were spent in Dorpat, where he became a major critic of Charles Darwin.

== Contributions ==
=== Embryology ===
Von Baer studied the embryonic development of animals, discovering the blastula stage of development and the notochord. Together with Heinz Christian Pander and based on the work by Caspar Friedrich Wolff, he described the germ layer theory of development (ectoderm, mesoderm, and endoderm) as a principle in a variety of species, laying the foundation for comparative embryology in the book Über Entwickelungsgeschichte der Thiere (On the evolutionary history of animals)(1828). Baer was inspired by the 1818 dissertation of Louis Sébastien Tredern de Lézérec on the development of the chicken embryo. In 1826, Baer discovered the mammalian ovum. The human ovum was first described by Edgar Allen in 1928. In 1827, he completed research Ovi Mammalium et Hominis genesi for St Petersburg's Academy of Science (published at Leipzig). In 1827 von Baer became the first person to observe human ova. Only in 1876 did Oscar Hertwig prove that fertilization is due to fusion of an egg and sperm cell.

Von Baer formulated what became known as Baer's laws of embryology:

1. General characteristics of the group to which an embryo belongs develop before special characteristics.
2. General structural relations are likewise formed before the most specific appear.
3. The form of any given embryo does not converge upon other definite forms, but separates itself from them.
4. The embryo of a higher animal form never resembles the adult of another animal form, such as one less evolved, but only its embryo.

=== Permafrost research ===
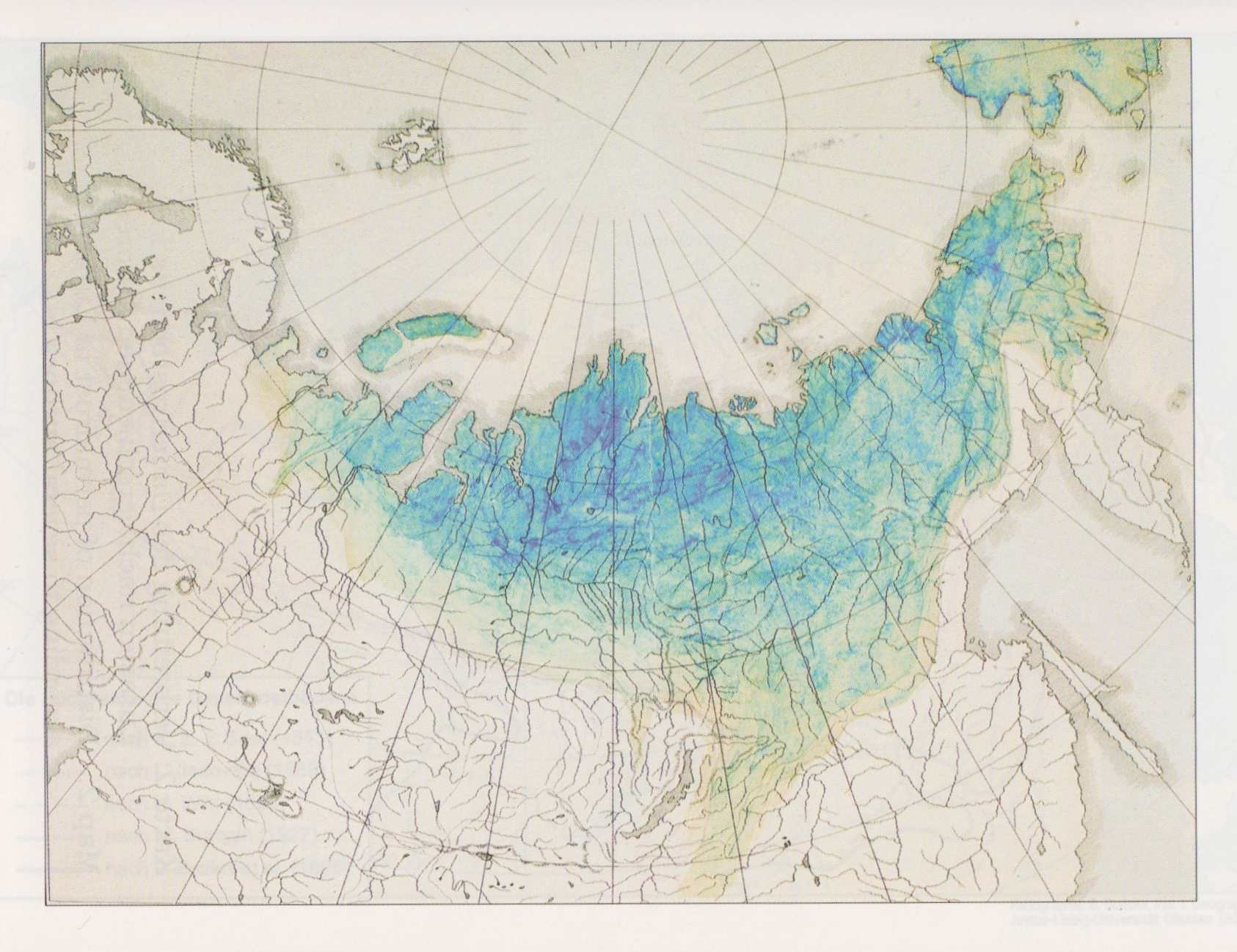
Permafrost occurrences and southern limit of permafrost according to Karl Ernst von Baer, 1843

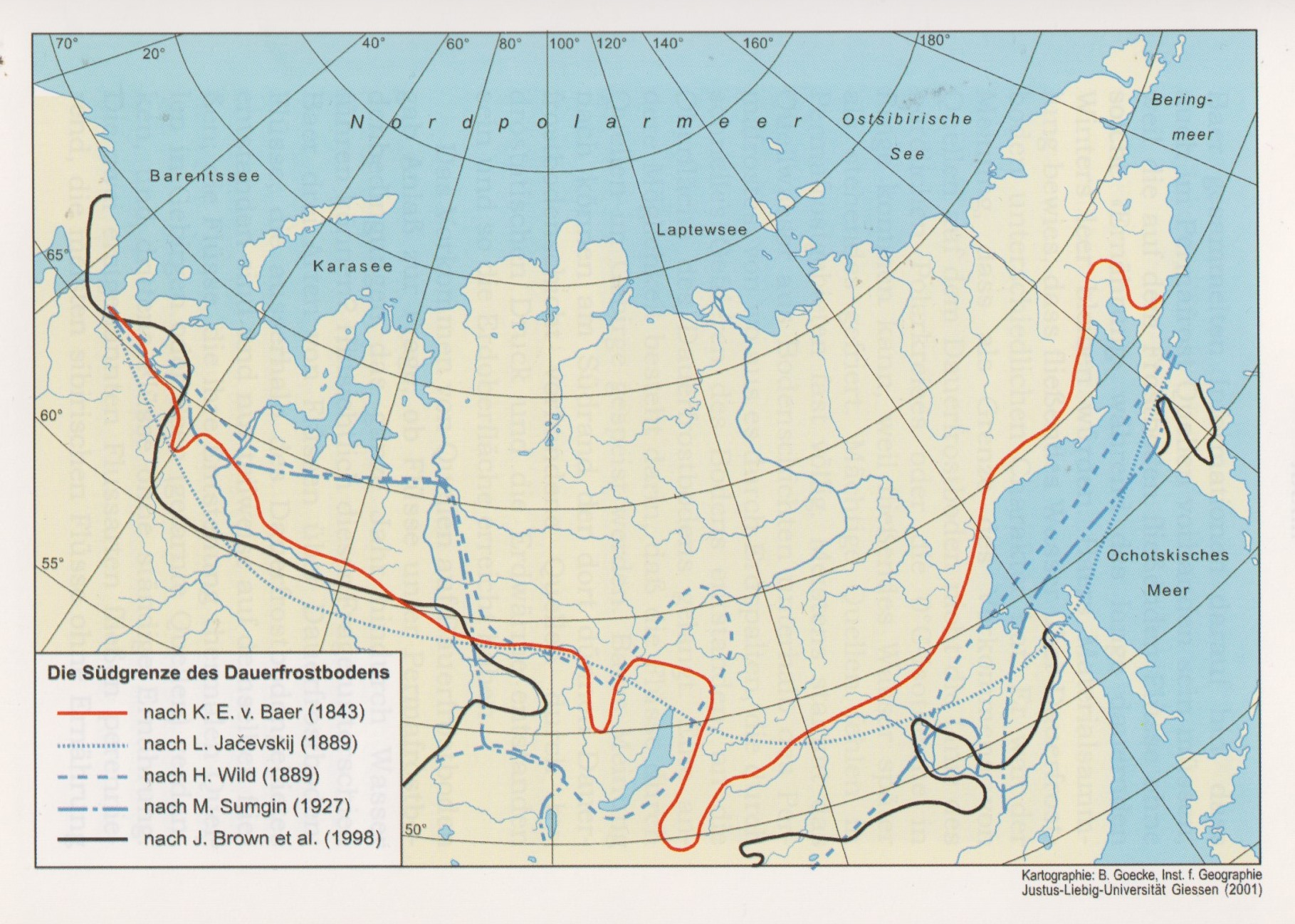
Southern limit of permafrost according to Karl Ernst von Baer (1843), and other authors. The southern limit of permafrost as delineated by Baer in 1843 corresponds well with the actual limit defined by Jerry Brown (1998).

Baer was a genius scientist covering not only the topics of embryology and ethnology, he also was especially interested in the geography of the northern parts of Russia, and explored Novaya Zemlya in 1837. In these arctic environments, he was studying periglacial features, permafrost occurrences, and collecting biological specimens. Other travels led him to subarctic regions of the North Cape and Lapland, but also to the Caspian Sea. He was one of the founders of the Russian Geographical Society.

Thanks to Baer's research expeditions, the scientific investigation of permafrost began in Russia. Baer recorded the importance of permafrost research even before 1837 when observing in detail the geothermal gradient from a 116.7 m deep shaft in Yakutsk. At the end of the 1830s, he recommended sending expeditions to explore permafrost in Siberia and suggested Alexander von Middendorff as leader. Baer's expedition instructions written for Middendorff comprised over 200 pages. Baer summarised his knowledge in 1842/43 in a print-ready typescript. The German title is „Materialien zur Kenntniss des unvergänglichen Boden-Eises in Sibirien“ (Materials for the Knowledge of the Perennial Ground Ice in Siberia). This world's first permafrost textbook was conceived as a complete work for printing. But it remained lost for more than 150 years. However, from 1838 onwards, Baer published a larger number of small publications on permafrost. Numerous of Baer's papers on permafrost were already published as early as 1837 and 1838. Well known was his paper "On the Ground Ice or Frozen Soil of Siberia", published in the Journal of the Royal Geographical Society of London (1838, pp. 210–213) and reprinted 1839 in the American Journal of Sciences and Arts by S. Silliman. There are many other publications and small notes on permafrost by Baer, as shown in the Karl Ernst von Baer museum in Tartu (Estonia), now part of the Estonian University of Life Sciences.

There are quite a number of studies in Russian about the origin of permafrost research. Russian authors usually relate with it the name Alexander von Middendorff (1815–1894), as he did much scientific work during the years 1842–1845 concerning permafrost on Taimyr Peninsula and in East-Siberia. However, Russian scientists during the 1940s also realised, that it was K. E. Baer who initiated this expedition and that the origin of scientific permafrost research must be fixed with Baer's thorough earlier scientific work. They even believed, that the scepticism about the permafrost findings and publications of Middendorff would not have risen, if Baer's original "materials for the study of the perennial ground-ice" would have been published in 1842 as intended. This was realised also by the Russian Academy of Sciences that honoured Baer with the publication of a tentative Russian translation done already in 1842 by Sumgin. These facts were completely forgotten until after the Second World War.

In North America, permafrost research started after the Second World War with the creation of the Cold Regions Research and Engineering Laboratory (CRREL), a division of the US army. It was realised that the understanding of frozen ground and permafrost are essential factors in strategic northern areas during the Cold War. In the Soviet Union, the Melnikov Permafrost Institute in Yakutsk had similar aims. The first post-World War major contact between groups of senior Russian and American frozen ground researchers took place in November 1963 in Yakutsk.However, Baer's permafrost textbook remained still undiscovered.

Thus in 2001 the discovery and annotated publication of the typescript from 1843 in the library archives of the University of Giessen was a scientific sensation. The full text of Baer's work is available online (234 pages). The editor Lorenz King added to the facsimile reprint a preface in English, two colour permafrost maps of Eurasia and some figures of permafrost features. Baer's text is introduced with detailed comments and references on additional 66 pages written by the Estonian historian Erki Tammiksaar.

Baer's observations on permafrost distribution and his periglacial morphological descriptions are largely still correct today. He distinguished between "continental" and "insular" permafrost, saw the temporary existence of permafrost and postulated the formation and further development of permafrost as a result of the complex physio-geographical, geological and floristic site conditions. With his permafrost classification Baer laid the foundation for the modern permafrost terminology of the International Permafrost Association. With his compilation and analysis of all available data on ground ice and permafrost, Karl Ernst von Baer must be given the attribute "founder of scientific permafrost research".

=== Evolution ===
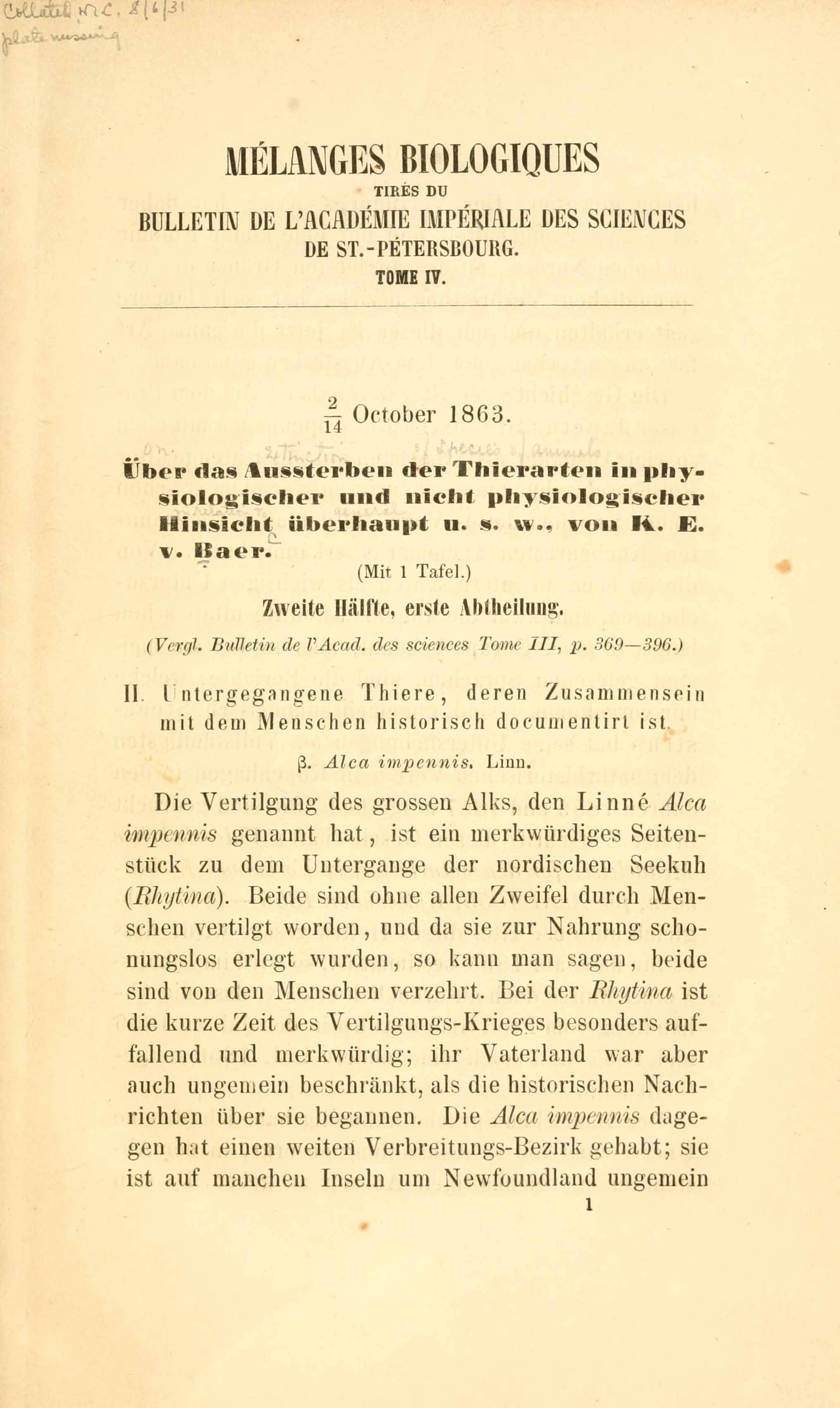
Über das Aussterben der Thierarten in physiologischer und nicht physiologischer Hinsicht überhaupt, 1863

From his studies of comparative embryology, Baer had believed in the transmutation of species but rejected later in his career the theory of natural selection proposed by Charles Darwin. He produced an early tree-like branching diagram illustrating the sequential origins of derived character states in vertebrate embryos during ontogeny that implies a pattern of phylogenetic relationship.

In the fifth edition of On the Origin of Species published in 1869, Charles Darwin added a Historical Sketch giving due credit to naturalists who had preceded him in publishing the opinion that species undergo modification, and that the existing forms of life have descended by true generation from pre-existing forms. According to Darwin:

"Von Baer, towards whom all zoologists feel so profound a respect, expressed about the year 1859... his conviction, chiefly grounded on the laws of geographical distribution, that forms now perfectly distinct have descended from a single parent-form."

He was a pioneer in studying biological time – the perception of time in different organisms. Baer believed in a teleological force in nature which directed evolution (orthogenesis).

=== Other topics ===
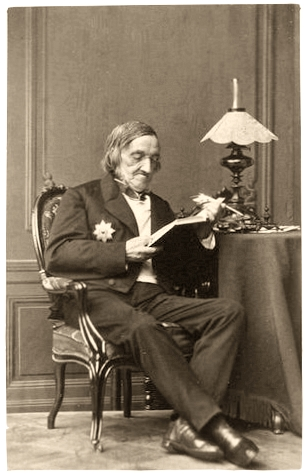
K. Baer, 1865

The term Baer's law is also applied to the unconfirmed proposition that in the Northern Hemisphere, erosion occurs mostly on the right banks of rivers, and in the Southern Hemisphere on the left banks. In its more thorough formulation, which Baer never formulated himself, the erosion of rivers depends on the direction of flow, as well. For example, in the Northern Hemisphere, a section of river flowing in a north–south direction, according to the theory, erodes on its right bank due to the coriolis effect, while in an east–west section there is no preference. However, this was repudiated by Albert Einstein's tea leaf paradox.

Baer investigated peculiar landforms in the vicinity of Volga Delta: groups of knolls with heights up to 25 m named Baer knolls after him.

== Awards and distinctions ==
In 1849, he was elected a foreign honorary of the American Academy of Arts and Sciences. He was elected a foreign member of the Royal Swedish Academy of Sciences in 1850. In 1852, he was conferred the title of Honorary Fellow of the University of Tartu. He was the president of the Estonian Naturalists' Society in 1869–1876, and was a co-founder and first president of the Russian Entomological Society. In 1875, he became a foreign member of the Royal Netherlands Academy of Arts and Sciences.

== Legacy ==
A statue honouring him can be found on Toome Hill in Tartu, as well as at Lasila manor, Estonia, and at the Zoological Museum in St Petersburg, Russia. In Tartu, there is also located Baer House which also functions as Baer Museum.

Before the Estonian conversion to the euro, the 2-kroon bank note bore his portrait. Baer Island in the Kara Sea was named after Karl Ernst von Baer for his important contributions to the research of arctic meteorology between 1830 and 1840. A duck, Baer's pochard, was also named after him.

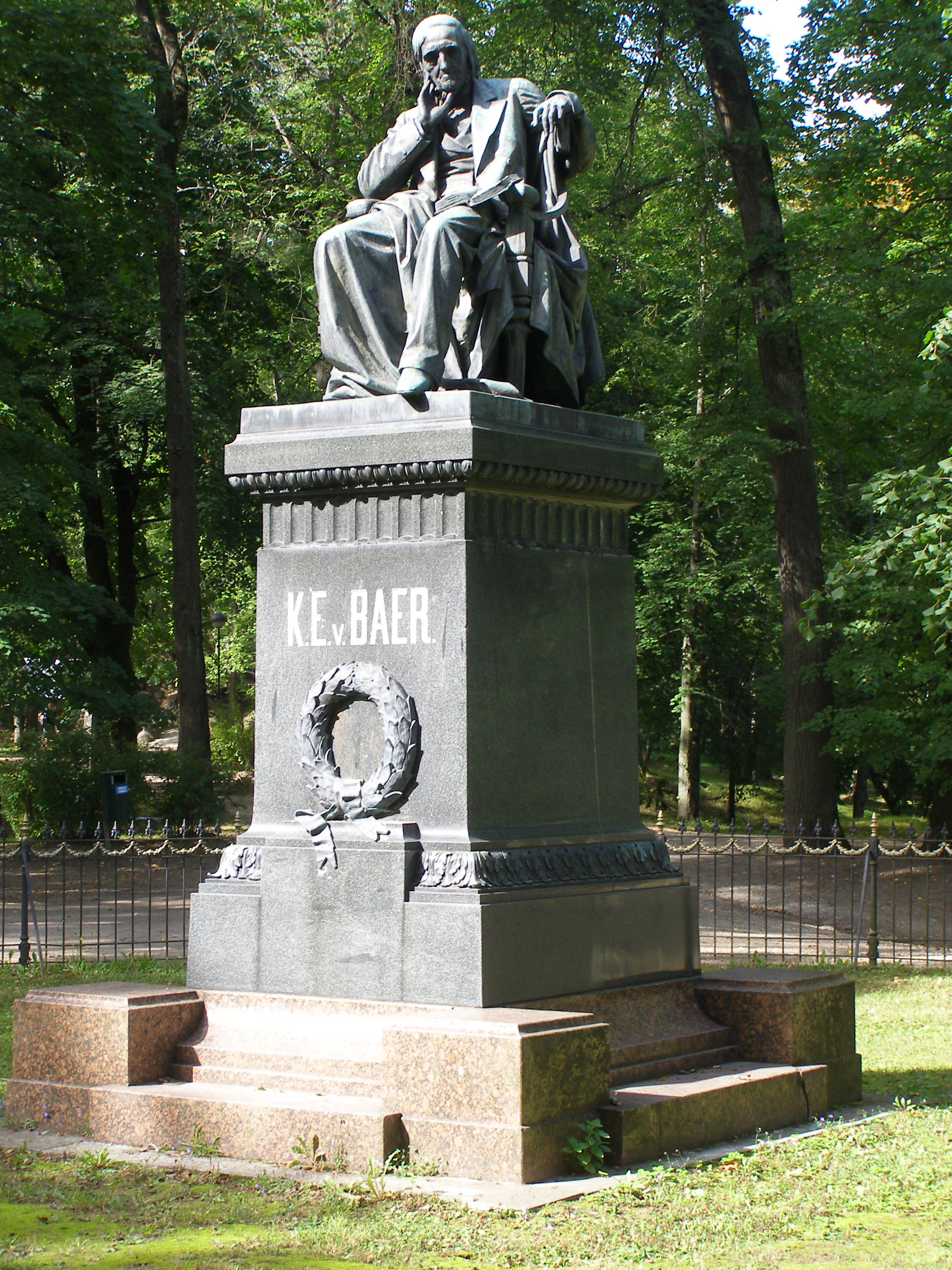
Statue of Karl Ernst von Baer on Toome Hill, Tartu: As a tradition, students wash the statue's head with champagne every Walpurgis Night.

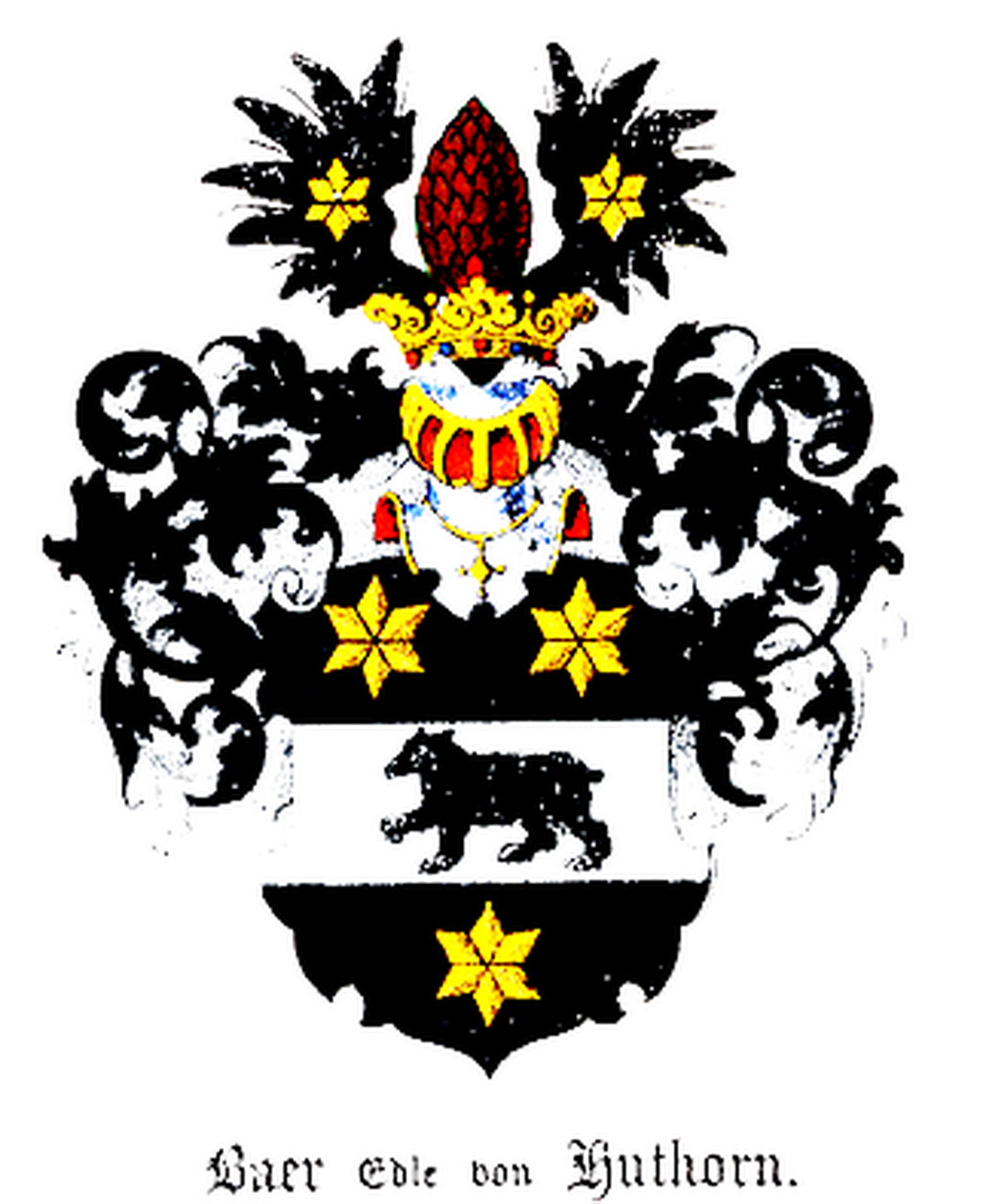
Coat of arms of the Baer Edle von Huthorn family of 1749, in the Baltic Coat of arms book by Carl Arvid von Klingspor in 1882

== Works ==
- Karl Ernst von Baer, Gregor von Helmersen. Beiträge zur Kenntniss des Russischen Reiches und der angränzenden Länder Asiens, 2 vols. Kaiserlichen Akademie der Wissenschaften, 1839. Google Books.
- Karl Ernst von Baer, Welche Auffassung der lebenden Natur ist die richtige? Berlin, 1862
