= Beiträge zur Kenntniss des Russischen Reiches und der angrenzenden Länder Asiens =

Beiträge zur Kenntniss des Russischen Reiches und der angränzenden Länder Asiens
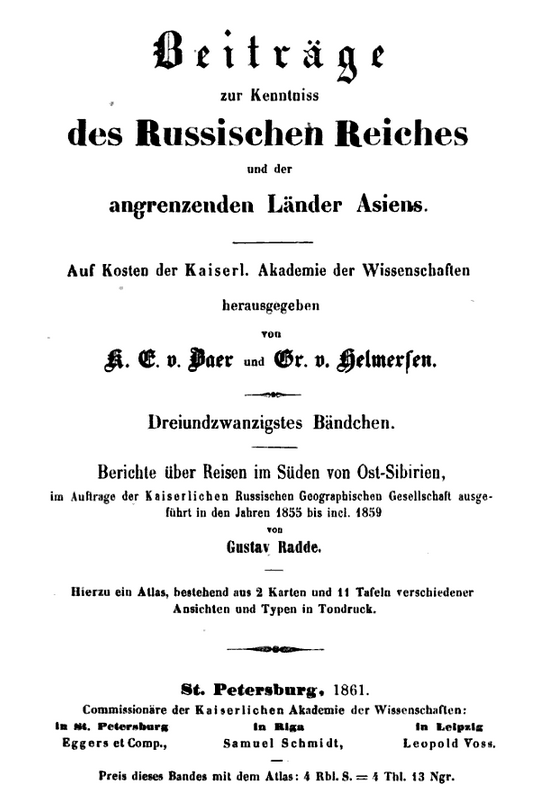
- Cover of an 1861 issue of the journal
- Language: German

Publication details
- History: 1839-?
- Publisher: Imperial Saint Petersburg Academy of Sciences (Russia)

Standard abbreviations
- ISO 4: Beitr. Kennt. Russ. Reiches Angränzenden Länder Asiens

Indexing
- OCLC no.: 73627821

Beiträge zur Kenntniss des Russischen Reiches und der angränzenden Länder Asiens (Contributions to Knowledge of the Russian Empire and Neighboring Countries of Asia; est. 1839) was a scholarly periodical published by the Imperial Saint Petersburg Academy of Sciences in Russia. Editors included Karl Ernst von Baer and Gregor von Helmersen.
