= Ignaz Döllinger =

German doctor, anatomist and physiologist

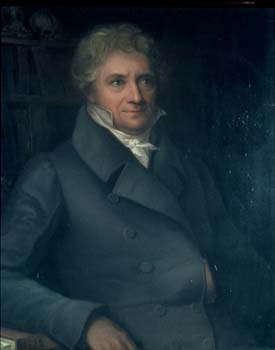
- Born: 24 May 1770; Bamberg, Prince-Bishopric of Bamberg
- Died: 14 January 1841 (aged 70); Munich, Kingdom of Bavaria
- Education: University of Bamberg; University of Würzburg; University of Pavia; University of Vienna
- Scientific career
- Fields: Medicine, anatomy, physiology
- Workplaces: University of Bamberg; University of Würzburg; Ludwig-Maximilians-Universität München
- Academic advisors: Antonio Scarpa
- Doctoral students: Johann Lukas Schönlein

Ignaz Döllinger (24 May 1770 – 14 January 1841) was a German medical doctor, anatomist and physiologist and as a professor at the Ludwig-Maximilians-Universität München, he was among the first to understand and treat medicine as a natural science. He was especially interested in the early development of organisms and was a major influence on several pioneer embryologists.

== Biography ==
Döllinger was born in 1770 in Bamberg, where his father Ignaz (1721-1800) was a professor at the University of Bamberg and physician to the Prince-Bishop Franz Ludwig von Erthal. His mother Magdalena (1737–1801) was the daughter of a church official Ignaz Flöckher (1701–63). He commenced his studies in his native town and went to the University of Bamberg to study natural sciences. He shifted to medicine continuing at the University of Würzburg, the University of Pavia, and the University of Vienna, before returning to the University of Bamberg. Soon after gaining his doctorate in 1794, he worked as a physician in Bamberg, and two years later, he became professor for physiology and general pathology at the University of Bamberg, but was called to a professorship of anatomy and physiology at the University of Würzburg in 1803 as the successor to the former city doctor, physiologist and natural philosopher Johann Joseph Dömling (1771–1803). In 1823, he moved to Munich (to the Academy, as the University was still in Landshut at this time) as a successor to Samuel Thomas von Sömmerring. When the Ludwig-Maximilians-Universität finally moved to Munich, he transferred there. His best known students were Louis Agassiz, Karl Ernst von Baer, Lucas Schönlein, Christian Heinrich von Pander, Lorenz Oken and Philipp Franz von Siebold. He was also an influence on the embryologist Louis Sébastien Tredern de Lézérec. In 1836, he was in charge of dealing with a cholera epidemic, and he too was affected. He died in Munich after bleeding internally from a stomach ulcer.

Döllinger's importance comes from his contributions to the understanding of human development and comparative anatomy, based on his knowledge in all areas of morphology and physiology. He was one of the first workers to perceive and treat medicine as a natural science – his work on the circulation of blood, secretory processes and the first stages of embryological development are exemplary here. At the same time, he was aware that simply collecting scientific facts was just as ineffective as pure speculation, and it was because of this attitude that he is considered a natural philosopher. He became interested in embryology and the ideas of Caspar Wolff that broke away from older ideas of preformation. He conducted experiments with his students Karl von Baer, Christian Heinrich von Pander, and others, making use of novel techniques including artificial incubation. He encouraged the use of microscopic observations and made improvements to instruments with Joseph von Fraunhofer and Georg Merz.
