= Sergey A. Belokobylskij =

Sergey Alexandrovich Belokobylskij
- Born: September 13, 1958; Spassk-Dalny, Primorsky Krai, Russia
- Citizenship: Soviet Union → Russia
- Education: Far Eastern State University, Vladivostok
- Known for: Studies on Braconidae; taxonomy of parasitic wasps
- Scientific career
- Fields: Entomology, Paleontology
- Workplaces: Zoological Institute of the Russian Academy of Sciences

Sergey Alexandrovich Belokobylskij (born 13 September 1958) is a Russian entomologist, Chief Researcher at the Zoological Institute of the Russian Academy of Sciences in Saint Petersburg. He holds a Doctor of Biological Sciences degree (1995). Between 2012 and 2017 he served as Vice President of the Russian Entomological Society. Belokobylskij is a leading specialist on parasitic wasps of the family Braconidae, having described over 700 new species and other taxa of insects.

== Biography ==
Belokobylskij was born on 13 September 1958 in Spassk-Dalny, Primorsky Krai, Russia. In 1980, he graduated from the Far Eastern State University in Vladivostok. From 1983 to 1986, he worked as a junior researcher at the Laboratory of Terrestrial Arthropods, Biology and Soil Institute, Far Eastern Scientific Center, USSR Academy of Sciences (Vladivostok). Since 1986, he has worked in the Laboratory of Insect Systematics at the Zoological Institute of the Russian Academy of Sciences in Saint Petersburg. In 1995, he defended his doctoral dissertation titled "Braconid wasps of the subfamilies Rhyssalinae, Doryctinae, Histeromerinae, and Exothecinae: morphology, biology, distribution and systematics". He currently serves as Chief Researcher and, since 2002, Head of the Hymenoptera Department at the same institute.

Belokobylskij is also Deputy Editor-in-Chief of Entomological Review, and a member of the Russian Entomological Society (Scientific Secretary 1998–2013; Vice President 2012–2017).

Since 2022, he has been the Editor-in-Chief of Proceedings of the Russian Entomological Society.

== Works ==
Belokobylskij has described 11 tribes, 19 subtribes, 49 genera, 18 subgenera, and more than 700 species of parasitic Braconidae wasps from all zoogeographic regions. He is the author, coauthor, and editor of several major monographs and identification guides on insect fauna.

=== Books and monographs ===
- Belokobylskij S.A. et al. Annotated Catalogue of the Hymenoptera of Russia. Volume II. Apocrita: Parasitica. Saint Petersburg: Zoological Institute RAS, 2019. (Proceedings of the Zoological Institute RAS, Supplement 8). ISBN 978-5-98092-067-8.
- Belokobylskij S.A. et al. Annotated Catalogue of the Hymenoptera of Russia. Volume I. Symphyta and Apocrita: Aculeata. Saint Petersburg: Zoological Institute RAS, 2017. (Proceedings of the Zoological Institute RAS, Supplement 6). ISBN 978-5-98092-062-3.
- Belokobylskij S.A., Tobias V.I., Sharkey M.J., Taeger A. (eds.). Key to the Insects of the Russian Far East. Vol. 4, Part 3–5. Family Braconidae. Vladivostok: Dal’nauka.
- Belokobylskij S.A., Maeto K. (2009). Doryctinae (Hymenoptera, Braconidae) of Japan. (Fauna mundi, Vol. 1). Warsaw: Warszawska Drukarnia Naukowa. 806 pp. ISBN 978-83-918040-8-7.
- Ku D.-S., Belokobylskij S.A., Cha J.-Y. (2001). Hymenoptera (Braconidae). Economic Insects of Korea 16. Insecta Koreana. Suppl. 23. 281 pp.
- Peris Felipo F.J., Belokobylskij S.A., Jiménez-Peydró R. (2014). "Revision of the Western Palaearctic species of the genus Dinotrema Foerster, 1862 (Hymenoptera, Braconidae, Alysiinae)". Zootaxa 3885(1): 1–483. https://doi.org/10.11646/zootaxa.3885.1.1
- Tang P., Belokobylskij S.A., Chen X.-X. (2015). "Spathius Nees, 1818 (Hymenoptera: Braconidae: Doryctinae) from China with a key to species." Zootaxa 3960(1): 1–132. https://doi.org/10.11646/zootaxa.3960.1.1
- Rosa P., Belokobylskij S.A., Zaytseva L.A. (2015). The Chrysididae types described by Semenov-Tian-Shanskij and deposited at the Zoological Institute of the Russian Academy of Sciences, Saint Petersburg (Insecta: Hymenoptera). Proceedings of the Zoological Institute RAS, Supplement 5. 266 pp.

=== Research grants and projects ===
- RFBR No. 19-04-00027_a: "Phylogenetic and morpho-biological foundations of the systematics and global biodiversity of problematic groups of higher Hymenoptera" (PI: S.A. Belokobylskij).
- RFBR No. 16-04-00197_a: "Parasitic and aculeate Hymenoptera: current issues of systematics, phylogeny and biodiversity" (PI: S.A. Belokobylskij).
- RFBR No. 15-29-02466_a: "Revision of taxonomic and genetic structure of biodiversity of Hymenoptera insects of Russia for the rational use of their natural potential" (PI: S.A. Belokobylskij).
- RFBR No. 13-04-00026_a: "Classification, phylogeny, biological and taxonomic diversity of problematic groups of higher Hymenoptera" (PI: S.A. Belokobylskij).

== Eponymy ==
Several animal species have been named in Belokobylskij’s honor, including:

- Arachnospila belokobylskii Loktionov & Lelej, 2011 (Pompilidae)
- Campodorus belokobylskii Kasparyan, 2005 (Ichneumonidae)
- Dacnusa belokobylskii Tobias, 1998 (Braconidae)
- Dendrocerus sergii Alekseev, 1994 (Megaspilidae)
- Dipara belokobylskii Dzhanokmen, 1993 (Pteromalidae)
- Exochus belokobylskii Tolkanitz, 2001 (Ichneumonidae)
- Gelanes belokobylskii Khalaim, 2002 (Ichneumonidae)
- Microleptes belokobylskii Humala, 2003 (Ichneumonidae)
- Neoitamus belokobylskii Lehr, 1999 (Asilidae)
- Orientopius belokobylskii Tobias, 1998 (Braconidae)
- Polyblastus belokobylskii Kasparyan, 1999 (Ichneumonidae)
- Priocnemis belokobylskii Lelej, 1988 (Pompilidae)
- Rhabdoblatta belokobylskii Anisyutkin, 2005 (Blaberidae)
- Stilbops belokobylskii Kasparyan & Kuslitzky, 1999 (Ichneumonidae)
- Vinata belokobylskii (Emeljanov, 1992) (Derbidae, Fulgoroidea)
