= Carriage shed (rail) =

In the context of rail transport, a carriage shed, car shed or coach shed is an undercover facility for storing, maintaining, and preparing passenger rail vehicles, usually known as carriages, cars or coaches, for service. These sheds protect the vehicles from the weather and provide space for repairs and servicing, allowing them to be stabled or housed between journeys.
