= Dreissigacker (Thuringia) =

Town in Germany

Coordinates: 50°33′35″N 10°23′14″E

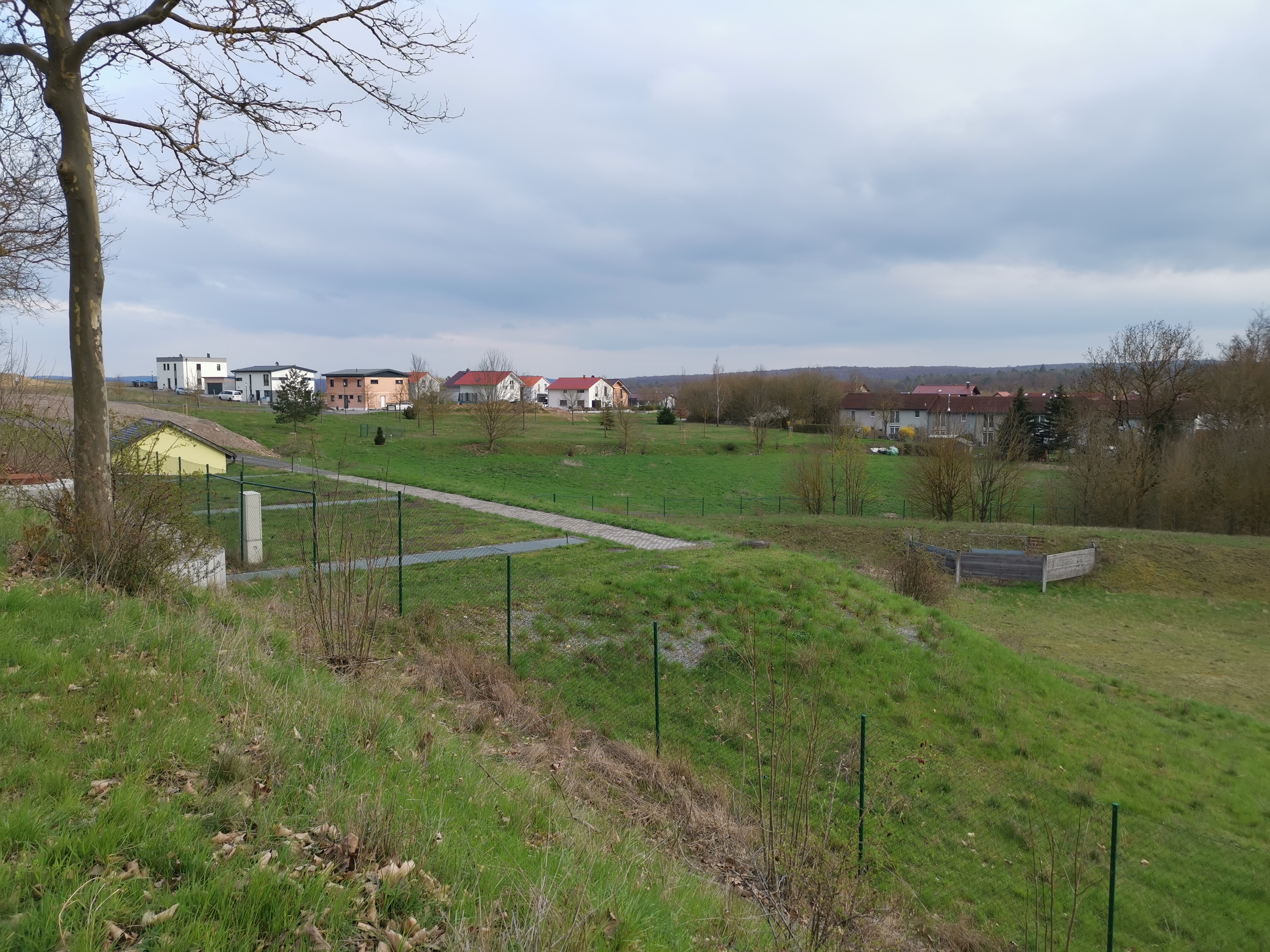

Dreissigacker (German: Dreißigacker [ˈdʁaɪsɪçˌʔakɐ], translated to "30 acres") is a town in the Duchy of Saxony-Meiningen in the state of Thuringia in Germany. The town is located one kilometer west of Meiningen, which is the economic and cultural center of the southern state of Thuringia.

== History ==
Dreissigacker is mentioned for the first time in a document dated August 22, 1311 written by Bartholod VII, count of Henneberg-Schleusingen, and is called Drizichaccher. On October 13, 1320, it was mentioned again, when 30 acres of forest were cleared for farmers to settle, which also explains the town name.

Between the years 1611 and 1658, a witch hunt took place in the town, during which four women and a man came to trial. 80-year-old Anna Gramann was executed at the stake in 1611; The outcome of the other four trials is unknown.

In 1641, during the Thirty Years' War, imperial soldiers destroyed the place by setting it on fire.

In 1710, Duke Ernst Ludwig I built a hunting lodge in Dreissigacker which housed Thuringia's first forestry college, the Dreissigacker Forest Academy, from 1801 to 1843.

In 1990, over 1300 residents lived in the town.

== Politics ==
The district council is made up of eight elected councilors. In the local elections on May 26, 2019, eight new council members were elected, all of whom belong to the Dreissigacker voting community . The community of voters achieved 1.3% of the vote in the Meiningen city council election, which is not enough for a seat on the city council.
