= Russian Entomological Society =

Russian scientific society

The Russian Entomological Society is a Russian scientific society devoted to entomology.

The Society was founded in 1859 in St. Petersburg by Karl Ernst von Baer, Johann Friedrich von Brandt who was then the director of the Zoological Museum of the Russian Academy of Science, Ya. A. Kushakevich, Colonel Alexander Karlovich Manderstern, Alexander von Middendorff and Colonel of General Staff Victor Ivanovitsch Motschulsky. Another society founder was Ferdinand Morawitz.

Karl v. Baer was elected the first president of the Society.

== See also ==
- List of Russian biologists
