= Gregor von Helmersen =

Baltic German geologist (1803–1885)

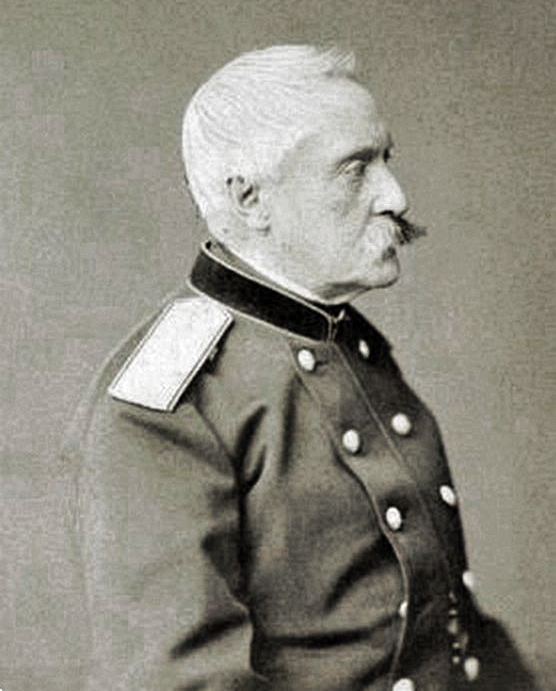
- Born: 11 October [O.S. 29 September] 1803; Duckershof Manor, Duckershof, Kreis Dorpat, Governorate of Livonia, Russian Empire (present-day Kammeri, Tartu County, Estonia)
- Died: 15 February [O.S. 3 February] 1885 (aged 81); St. Petersburg, Russian Empire
- Resting place: Raadi Cemetery, Tartu, Estonia
- Citizenship: Russian
- Scientific career
- Fields: Geology

Gregor von Helmersen or Grigory Petrovich Helmersen (Russian: Григорий Петрович Гельмерсен, 11 October [O.S. 29 September] 1803 – 15 February [O.S. 3 February] 1885) was a Baltic German geologist.

== Biography ==
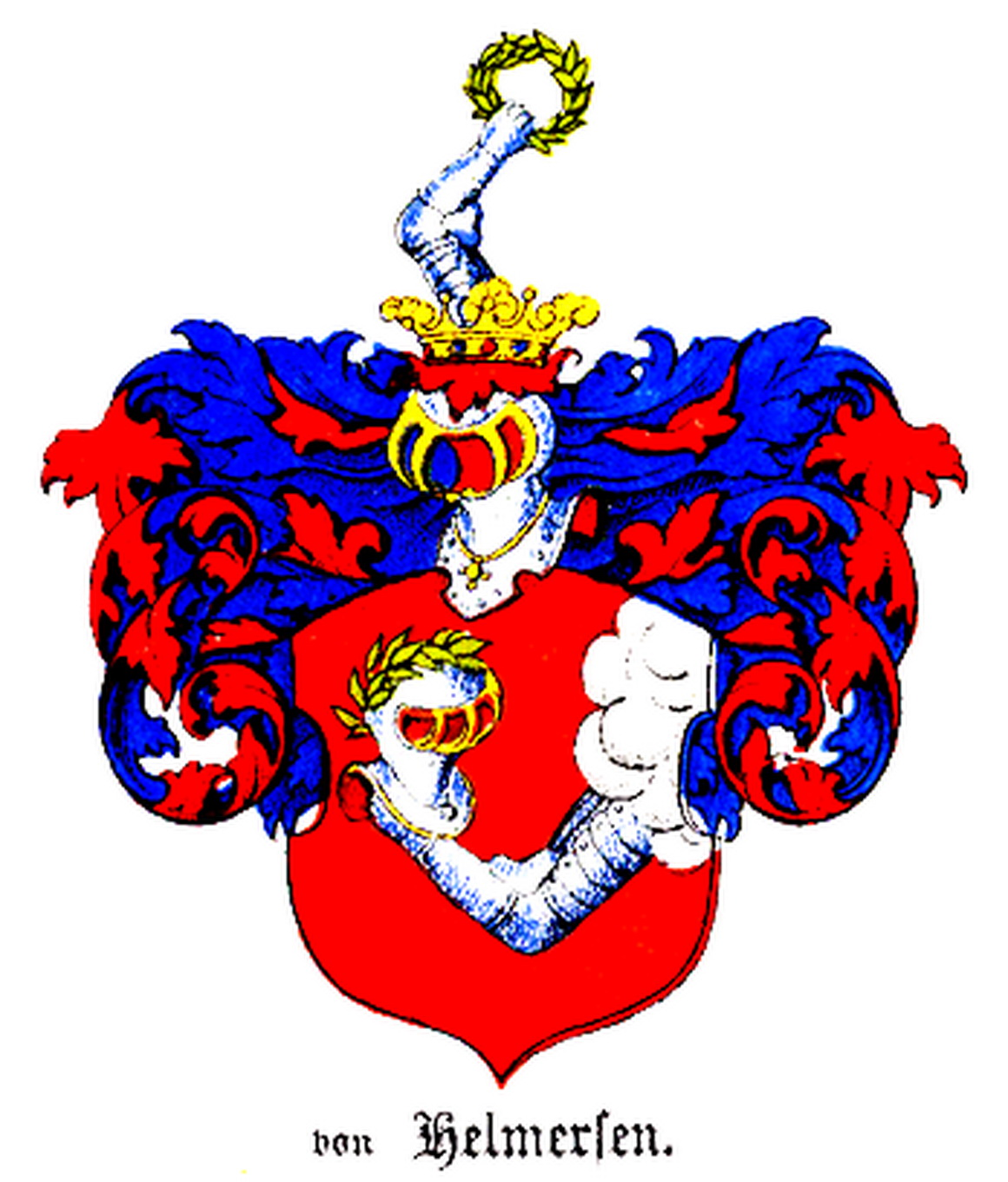
Coat of arms of the Helmersen family of 1643, in the Baltic Coat of arms book by Carl Arvid von Klingspor in 1882.

Helmersen was born in Duckershof, Livonia (now in Estonia) and went to boarding school in St. Petersburg. He graduated from the University of Dorpat in 1825 and joined the finance ministry. He accompanied Alexander von Humboldt into the Orenburg region and was recommended, along with E.K. Hoffman, by the minister E.F. Kankrin to be sent for higher education. The two travelled and listened to lectures in the universities of Berlin, Heidelberg, and Bonn. In 1835 he was put in the Corps of Mining Engineers and in 1838 he became professor of geology in the Mining Institute at Saint Petersburg of which he was also director.

In 1839, along with Karl Ernst von Baer, he founded the first serial natural scientific publication in Russia known as Beiträge zur Kenntniss des Russischen Reiches.

In 1850, he became an academician of the Russian Academy of Sciences in St Petersburg. He founded and became the first head of the Russian Geological Committee in 1882.

He was an author of numerous memoirs on the geology of Russia, especially on coal and other mineral deposits of the country; and he wrote also some explanations to accompany separate sheets of the geological map of Russia.

His geological work was continued to an advanced age, one of the later publications being Studien über die Wanderblöcke und die Diluvialgebilde Russlands (1869 and 1882). Most of his memoirs were published by the Imperial Academy of Sciences at Saint Petersburg.

== See also ==
- List of Baltic German scientists
