= Helmersen =

Baltic German noble family

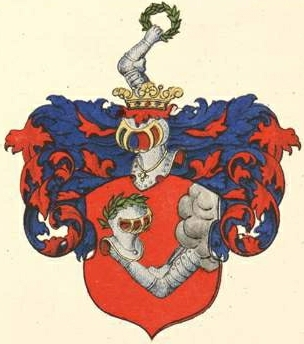
Coat of arms of Helmersen

The Helmersen family (earlier Helmes) was noble family which roots came from Hamburg, Germany. Helmersens lived in Sweden and Imperial Russia, including the Governorate of Livonia and Governorate of Estonia.

In 1651, Swedish Queen Christina gave noble status to Paul and Johann Helmes and they became von Helmersen.

== Notable members ==
- Gregor von Helmersen
- Vasily Helmersen
