= Kiltsi =

Village in Estonia

Coordinates: 59°05′24″N 26°10′36″E

- Village
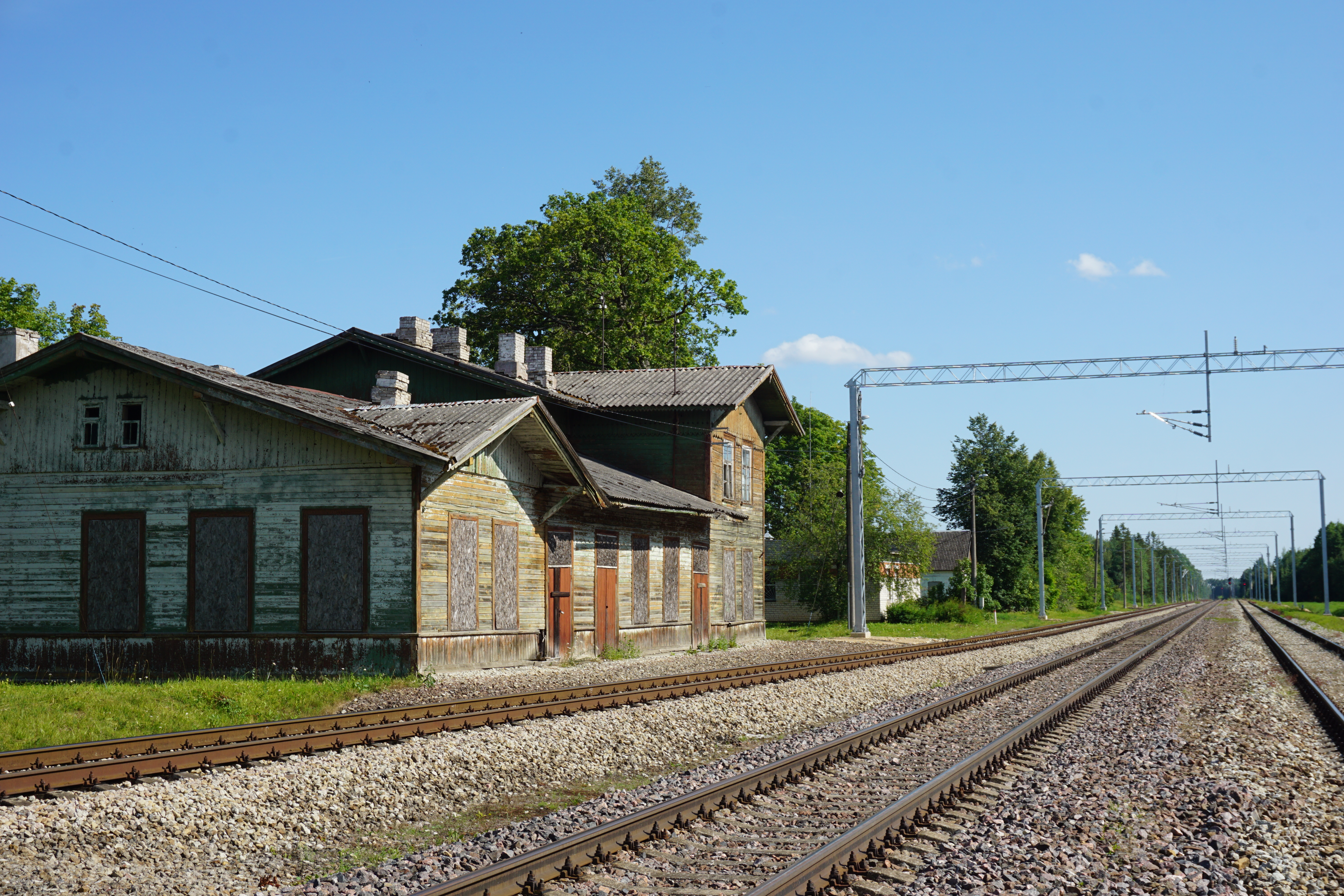
- Kiltsi railway station
- Interactive map of Kiltsi
- Country: Estonia
- County: Lääne-Viru County
- Parish: Väike-Maarja Parish
- Time zone: UTC+2 (EET)
  - Summer (DST): UTC+3 (EEST)

Kiltsi is a village in Väike-Maarja Parish, Lääne-Viru County, in northeastern Estonia.

Historical centre of Kiltsi Manor lies in Liivaküla, south of Kiltsi village.

Preceding station	Elron	Following station
Tamsalu towards Tallinn	Tallinn–Tartu–Valga	Rakke towards Valga
Tamsalu towards Tallinn	Tallinn–Tartu–Koidula	Rakke towards Koidula
