= Lahu =

Lahu may refer to:

- Lahu Band from Islamabad, Pakistan
- Lahu people
- Lahu language
- Lahu, Estonia, village in Väike-Maarja Parish, Lääne-Viru County, Estonia

== See also ==
- Laho (disambiguation)
