= August Jürima =

Estonian politician (1887–1942)

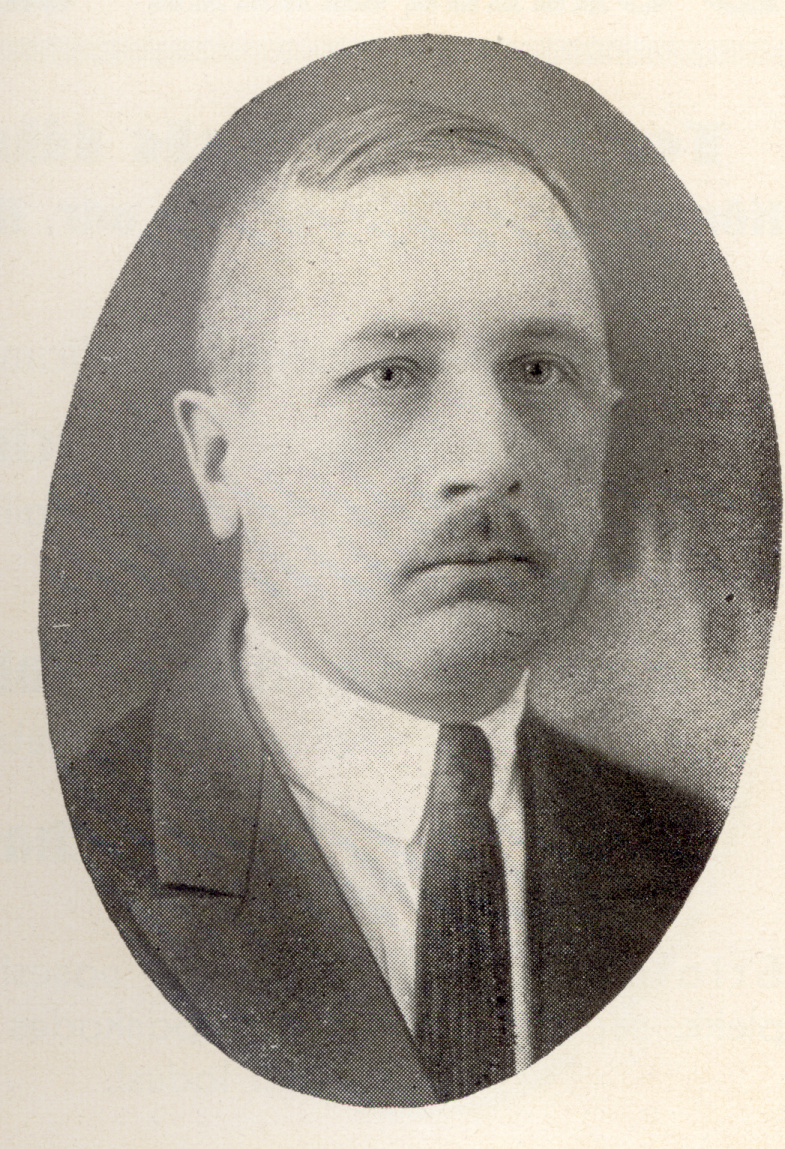
- August Jürima
- Born: August 23, 1887; Villakvere, Vaimastvere Parish (now Väike-Maarja Parish), Kreis Dorpat, Governorate of Livonia, Russian Empire
- Died: June 15, 1942; Kirov Oblast, Russian SFSR, Soviet Union
- Occupations: Agronomist; economist; politician
- Known for: Member of V Riigikogu; Minister of Economic Affairs (1932–1933)

August Jürima (also Jürman or Jürmann; 23 August 1887 in Villakvere, Vaimastvere Parish (now Väike-Maarja Parish), Kreis Dorpat – 15 June 1942 in Kirov Oblast) was an Estonian agronomist, economist, and politician. He was a member of V Riigikogu. From 1932 to 1933, he was Minister of Economic Affairs.
