= Triigi =

Triigi may refer to several places in Estonia:

- Triigi, Harju County, village in Kose Parish, Harju County
- Triigi, Lääne-Viru County, village in Väike-Maarja Parish, Lääne-Viru County
- Triigi, Saare County, village in Saaremaa Parish, Saare County
