= Kannukula =

Kannukula may refer to:

- Kännuküla, village in Lääne-Viru County, Estonia
- Kannuküla, village in Viljandi County, Estonia
