= Pudivere =

Pudivere may refer to several places in Estonia:

- Pudivere, Jõgeva County, village in Põltsamaa Parish, Jõgeva County
- Pudivere, Lääne-Viru County, village in Väike-Maarja Parish, Lääne-Viru County
