= Uuemõisa =

Uuemõisa may refer to several places in Estonia:

- Uuemõisa (borough), small borough in Haapsalu municipality, Lääne County
- Uuemõisa, Lääne County (village), village in Haapsalu municipality, Lääne County
- Uuemõisa, Lääne-Viru County, village in Väike-Maarja Parish, Lääne-Viru County
- Uuemõisa, Saare County, village in Saareamaa Parish, Saare County

== See also ==
- Kose-Uuemõisa, small borough in Kose Parish, Harju County
