= Kurtna =

Kurtna may refer to several places in Estonia:

- Kurtna, Harju County, village in Saku Parish, Harju County
- Kurtna, Ida-Viru County, village in Alutaguse Parish, Ida-Viru County
- Kurtna, Lääne-Viru County, village in Väike-Maarja Parish, Lääne-Viru County
