= Koluvere =

Koluvere may refer to several places in Estonia:

- Koluvere, Lääne County, village in Lääne-Nigula Parish, Lääne County
  - Koluvere Castle
- Koluvere, Lääne-Viru County, village in Väike-Maarja Parish, Lääne-Viru County
