= Kaavere =

Kaavere may refer to several places in Estonia:

- Kaavere, Jõgeva County, village in Põltsamaa Parish, Jõgeva County
- Kaavere, Lääne-Viru County, village in Väike-Maarja Parish, Lääne-Viru County
- Kaavere, Viljandi County, village in Viljandi Parish, Viljandi County
