= Aavere =

Aavere may refer to several places in Estonia:

- Aavere, Harju County, village in Anija Parish, Harju County
- Aavere, Tapa Parish, village in Tapa Parish, Lääne-Viru County
- Aavere, Väike-Maarja Parish, village in Väike-Maarja Parish, Lääne-Viru County
- Aavere, part of Lemmatsi village, Kambja Parish, Tartu County
