= Orguse =

Orguse may refer to several places in Estonia:

- Orguse, Lääne-Viru County, village in Väike-Maarja Parish, Lääne-Viru County
- Orguse, Rapla County, village in Rapla Parish, Rapla County
