= Varangu Nature Reserve =

Protected area in Estonia

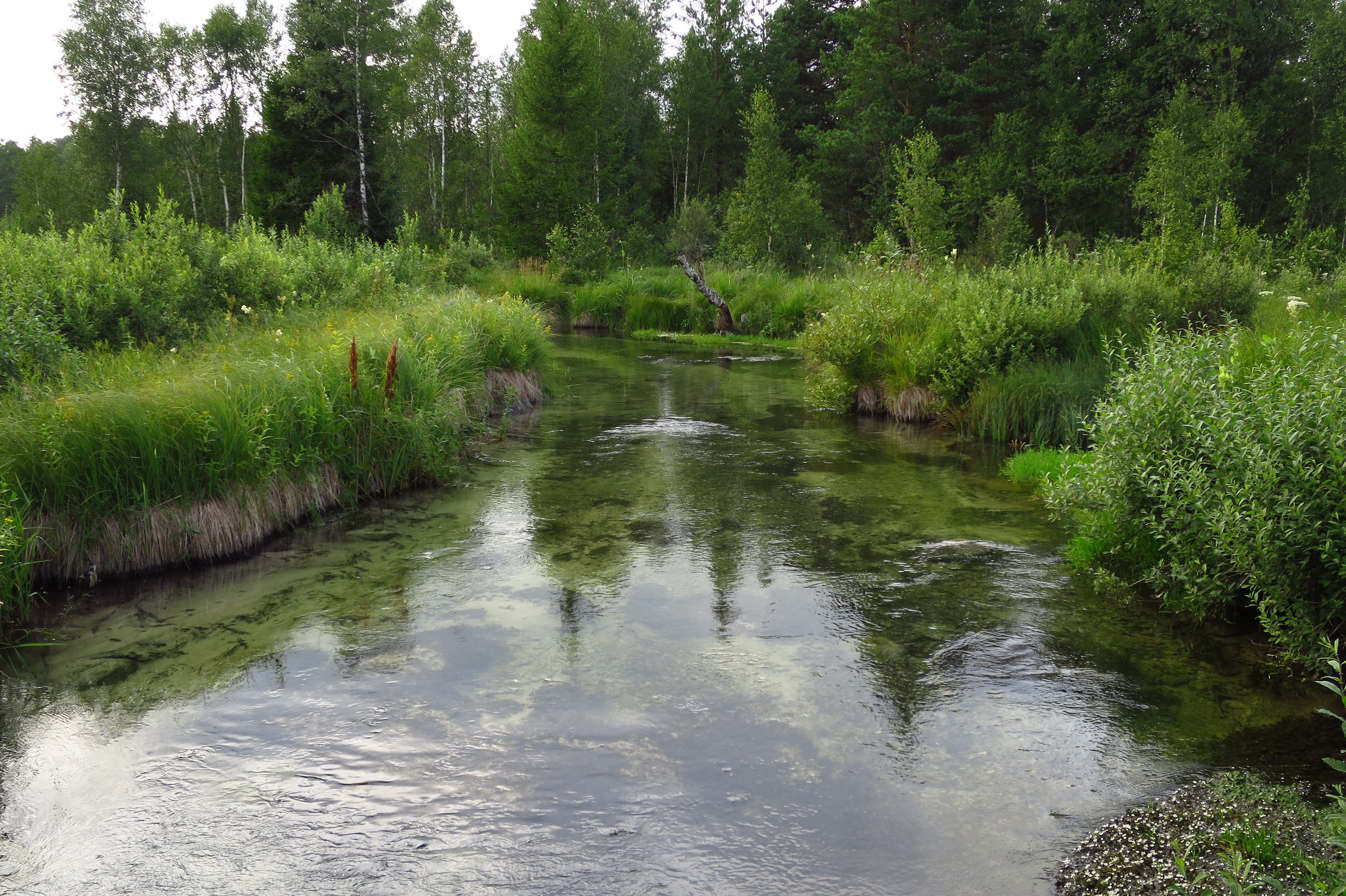

- Location within Estonia
- Location: Estonia
- Coordinates: 59°02′30″N 26°06′30″E
- Area: 105 ha (260 acres)
- Established: 1993 (2005)

Varangu Nature Reserve is a nature reserve which is located in Lääne-Viru County, Estonia.

The area of the nature reserve is 105 ha.

The protected area was founded in 1993 to protect the flora in Varangu village (Väike-Maarja Parish). In 2005, the protected area was designated to the nature reserve.
