= Vorsti =

Vorsti may refer to several places in Estonia:

- Vorsti, Jõgeva County, village in Põltsamaa Parish, Jõgeva County
- Vorsti, Lääne-Viru County, village in Väike-Maarja Parish, Lääne-Viru County
