= Lammasküla =

Village in Estonia

- Village
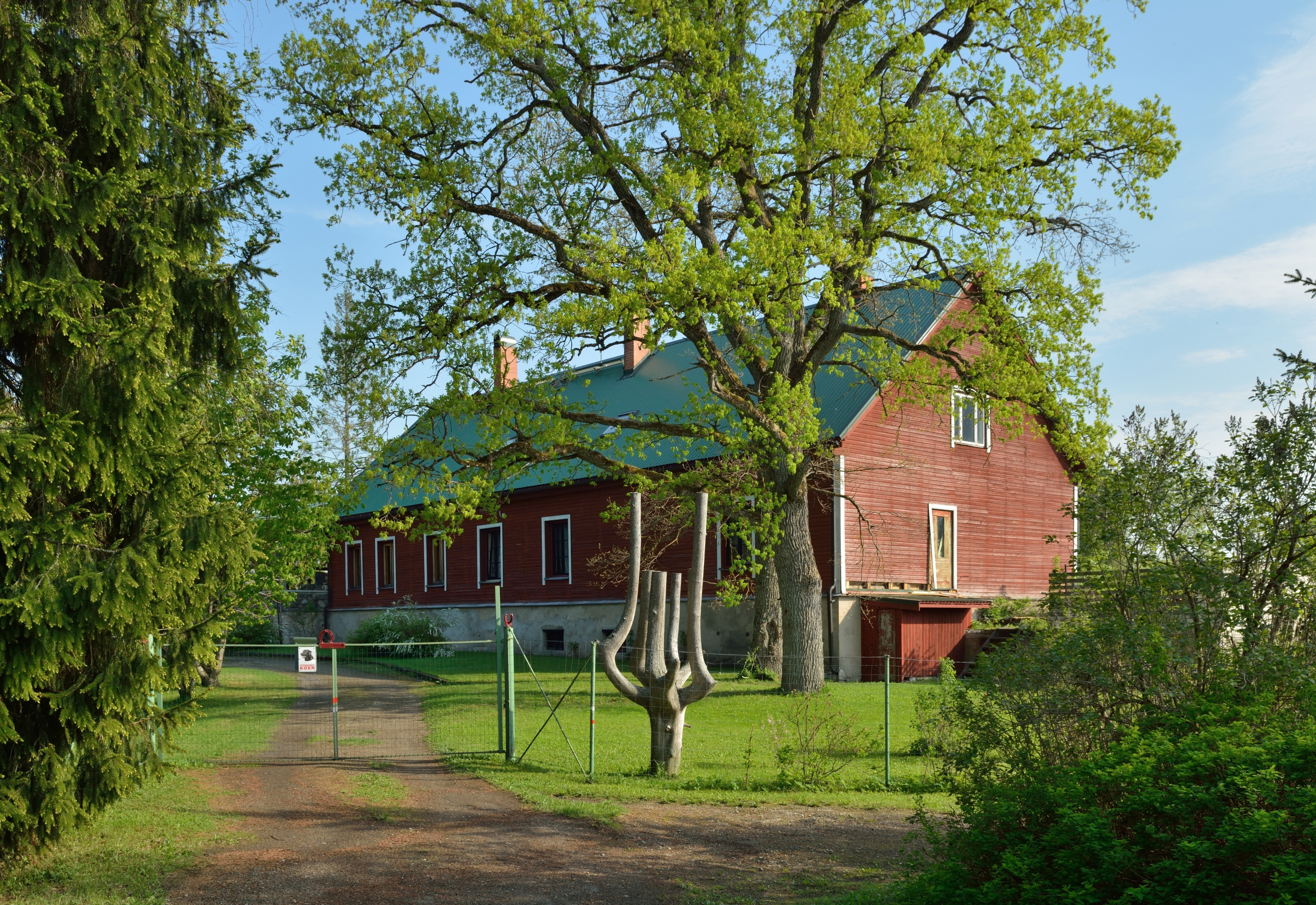
- Lammasküla manor

- Location within Estonia
- Coordinates: 59°N 26.271944444444°E
- Country: Estonia
- County: Lääne-Viru County
- Parish: Väike-Maarja Parish
- Time zone: UTC+2 (EET)
  - Summer (DST): UTC+3 (EEST)

Lammasküla is a village in Väike-Maarja Parish, Lääne-Viru County, in northeastern Estonia. Prior to the administrative reforms of Estonian municipalities in 2017, it was located in Rakke Parish.

Lammasküla half-manor (Lammasküll) was separated from the Ao Manor in 1819. In 1936 Lammasküla was again merged to Liigvalla Parish which was part of Järvamaa.

Lammasküla Manor had a starch factory.

Since 1856 Lammasküla was the location of a medical office which was served by Dr. O. L. Hoffmann, who also operated in Simuna, Väike-Maarja, Koeru and Järva-Jaani.
