= Pandivere =

Village in Estonia

- village
- Location in Estonia
- Coordinates: 59°09′39″N 26°17′43″E
- Country: Estonia
- County: Lääne-Viru County
- Municipality: Väike-Maarja Parish

Population (01.01.2011)
  - Total: 101

Pandivere (German: Pantifer) is a village in Väike-Maarja Parish, Lääne-Viru County, in northeastern Estonia. It has a population of 101 (as of 1 January 2011).

The surrounding upland Pandivere Heights (Pandivere kõrgustik) is named after the village.

Poet and writer Jakob Liiv worked as a schoolteacher in Pandivere from 1884 to 1886.

== Pandivere Manor ==
Pandivere Manor (German: Pantifer) was established in 1801 by detaching it from the nearby Kärsa Manor. It belonged to the Rennenkampffs. Nowadays, since a fire in the 1980s, the single-storey main building lies in ruins.
