= Koonu =

Village in Estonia

Coordinates: 59°09′N 26°16′E

- Village
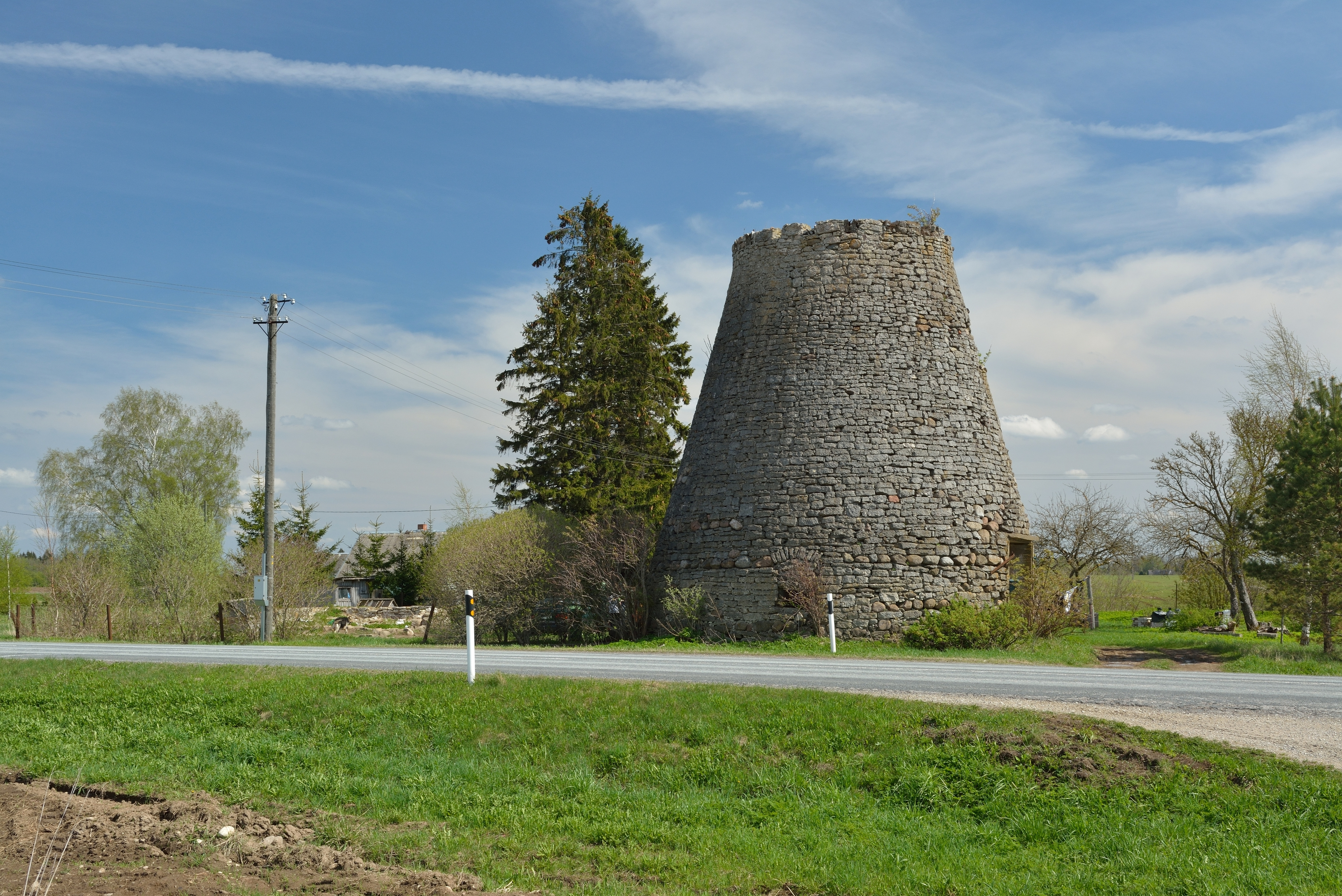
- Ruins of Koonu windmill
- Interactive map of Koonu
- Country: Estonia
- County: Lääne-Viru County
- Parish: Väike-Maarja Parish
- Time zone: UTC+2 (EET)
  - Summer (DST): UTC+3 (EEST)

Koonu (German: Kono) is a village in Väike-Maarja Parish, Lääne-Viru County, in northeastern Estonia.
