= Hirla =

Village in Estonia

Coordinates: 59°02′N 26°21′E

- Village
- Interactive map of Hirla
- Country: Estonia
- County: Lääne-Viru County
- Parish: Väike-Maarja Parish
- Time zone: UTC+2 (EET)
  - Summer (DST): UTC+3 (EEST)

Hirla is a village in Väike-Maarja Parish, Lääne-Viru County, in northeastern Estonia.
