= Müüriku =

Village in Estonia

Coordinates: 59°08′N 26°17′E

- Village
- Interactive map of Müüriku
- Country: Estonia
- County: Lääne-Viru County
- Parish: Väike-Maarja Parish
- Time zone: UTC+2 (EET)
  - Summer (DST): UTC+3 (EEST)

Müüriku (German: Marienhof) is a village in Väike-Maarja Parish, Lääne-Viru County, in northeastern Estonia.
