= Sandimetsa =

Village in Estonia

- Village
- Location within Estonia
- Coordinates: 59.0964°N 26.2417°E
- Country: Estonia
- County: Lääne-Viru County
- Parish: Väike-Maarja Parish
- Time zone: UTC+2 (EET)
  - Summer (DST): UTC+3 (EEST)

Sandimetsa is a village in Väike-Maarja Parish, Lääne-Viru County in Estonia.
