= Eipri =

Village in Estonia

Coordinates: 59°08′N 26°20′E

- Village
- Interactive map of Eipri
- Country: Estonia
- County: Lääne-Viru County
- Parish: Väike-Maarja Parish
- Time zone: UTC+2 (EET)
  - Summer (DST): UTC+3 (EEST)

Eipri is a village in Väike-Maarja Parish, Lääne-Viru County, in northeastern Estonia.
