= Rakke =

Borough in Estonia

- Small borough
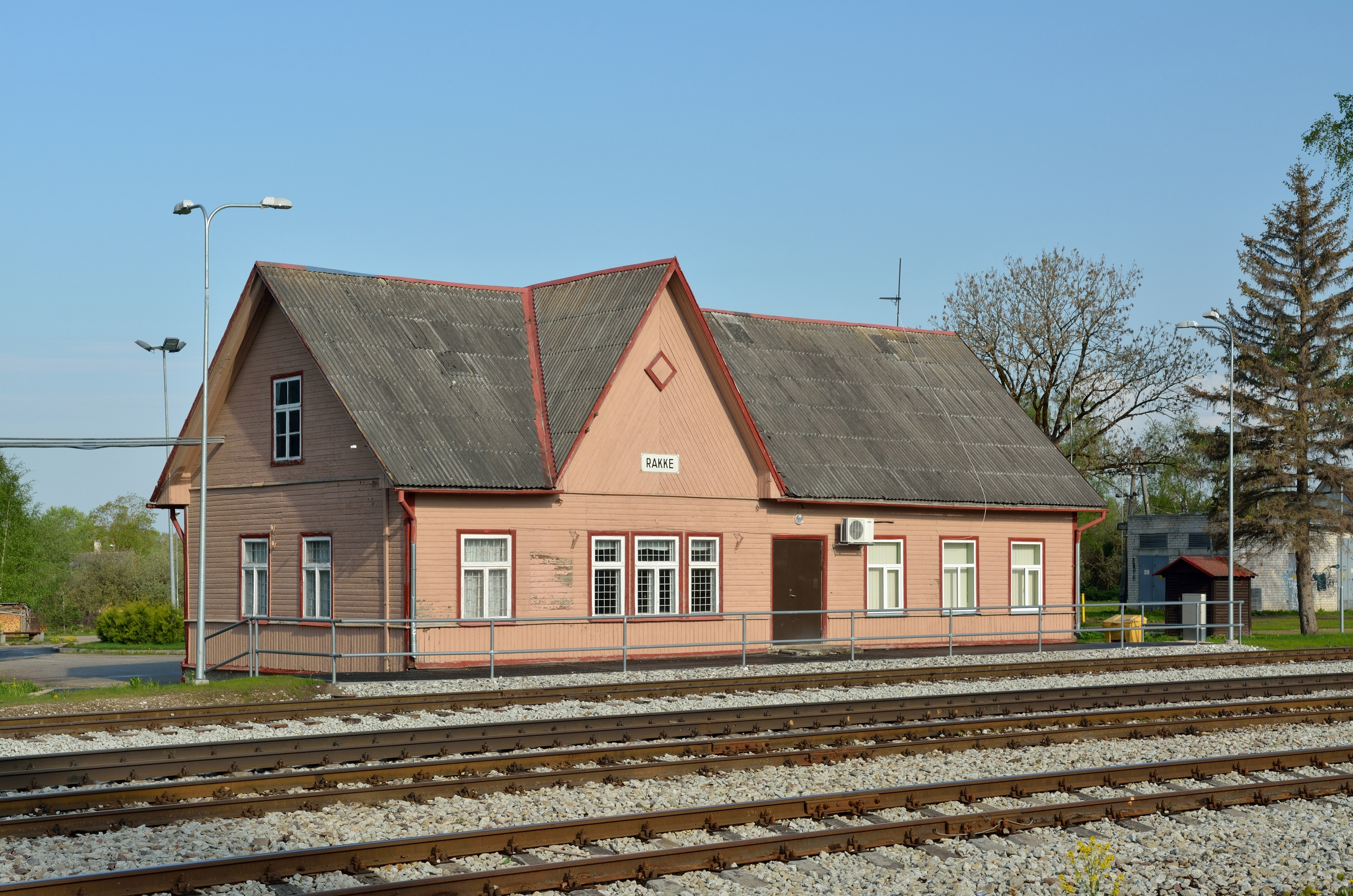
- Rakke station building

- Location in Estonia
- Coordinates: 58°59′11″N 26°14′50″E
- Country: Estonia
- County: Lääne-Viru County
- Municipality: Väike-Maarja Parish

Population
  - Total: 1,015

Rakke is a small borough (Estonian: alevik) in Väike-Maarja Parish, Lääne-Viru County, Estonia. Rakke has a population of 1015.

Before the 2017 Administrative Reform, Rakke was the administrative centre of Rakke Parish.

== Notable people ==
- Õnne Kurg (born 1973), cross-country skier, born in Rakke
- Hugo Raudsepp (1883–1952), writer, worked in Rakke in his youth
- Marta Sillaots (1887–1969), writer, translator, and literary critic, born in Rakke

Preceding station	Elron	Following station
Kiltsi towards Tallinn	Tallinn–Tartu–Valga	Vägeva towards Valga
Kiltsi towards Tallinn	Tallinn–Tartu–Koidula	Vägeva towards Koidula
