= Pandivere Upland =

Upland in Estonia

Coordinates: 59°14′N 26°17′E

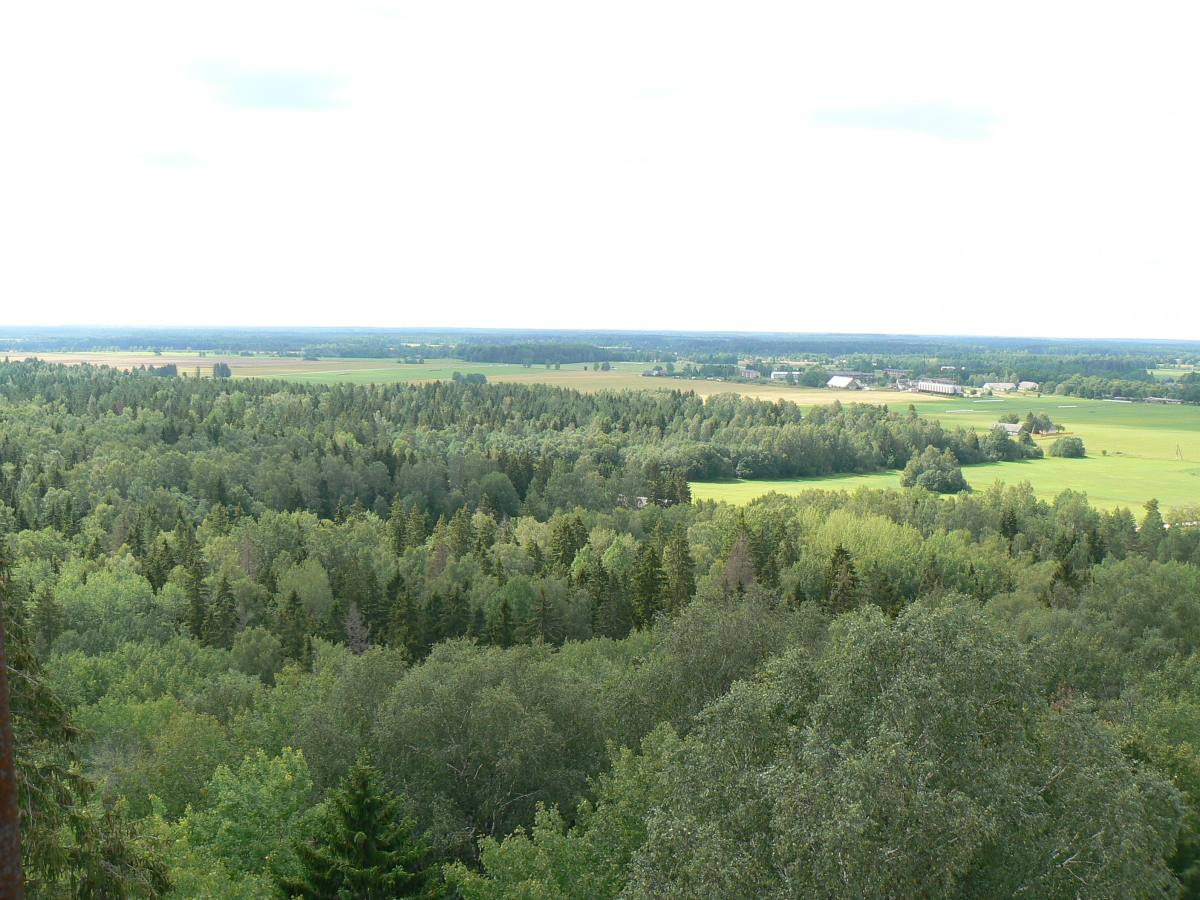
View from Ebavere Hill

Pandivere Upland (or Pandivere Heights, Estonian: Pandivere kõrgustik) is hilly area of higher elevation in Northern Estonia.

It contains the highest point of Northern Estonia: Emumägi (166 m).

The area is named for the village of Pandivere.
