= Kõpsta =

Village in Estonia

Coordinates: 58°57′N 26°09′E

- Village
- Interactive map of Kõpsta
- Country: Estonia
- County: Lääne-Viru County
- Parish: Väike-Maarja Parish
- Time zone: UTC+2 (EET)
  - Summer (DST): UTC+3 (EEST)

Kõpsta is a village in Väike-Maarja Parish, Lääne-Viru County, in northeastern Estonia.
