= Pudivere, Lääne-Viru County =

Village in Estonia

Pudivere
- village
- Location in Estonia
- Coordinates: 59°05′21″N 26°21′24″E
- Country: Estonia
- County: Lääne-Viru County
- Municipality: Väike-Maarja Parish

Population (01.01.2011)
  - Total: 41

Pudivere is a village in Väike-Maarja Parish, Lääne-Viru County, in northeastern Estonia. It has a population of 41 (as of 1 January 2011).

Pudivere Manor (German: Poidifer) was established in 1586 by detaching it from neighbouring Võivere Manor. Until the dispossessing in 1919 it belonged to the owners of Avanduse Manor the Bremen family. Since the fire in 1999 the 1896–97 built stylish wooden historicist main building is in the ruins.

Estonian writer Eduard Vilde was born in 1865 as the son of local overseer of Pudivere Manor. In his 100th anniversary in 1965 a memorial stone was opened 1 km east of Pudivere in a place known as Pelgulinn.
