= Koluvere, Lääne-Viru County =

Village in Estonia

Coordinates: 58°55′N 26°14′E

Koluvere
- Village
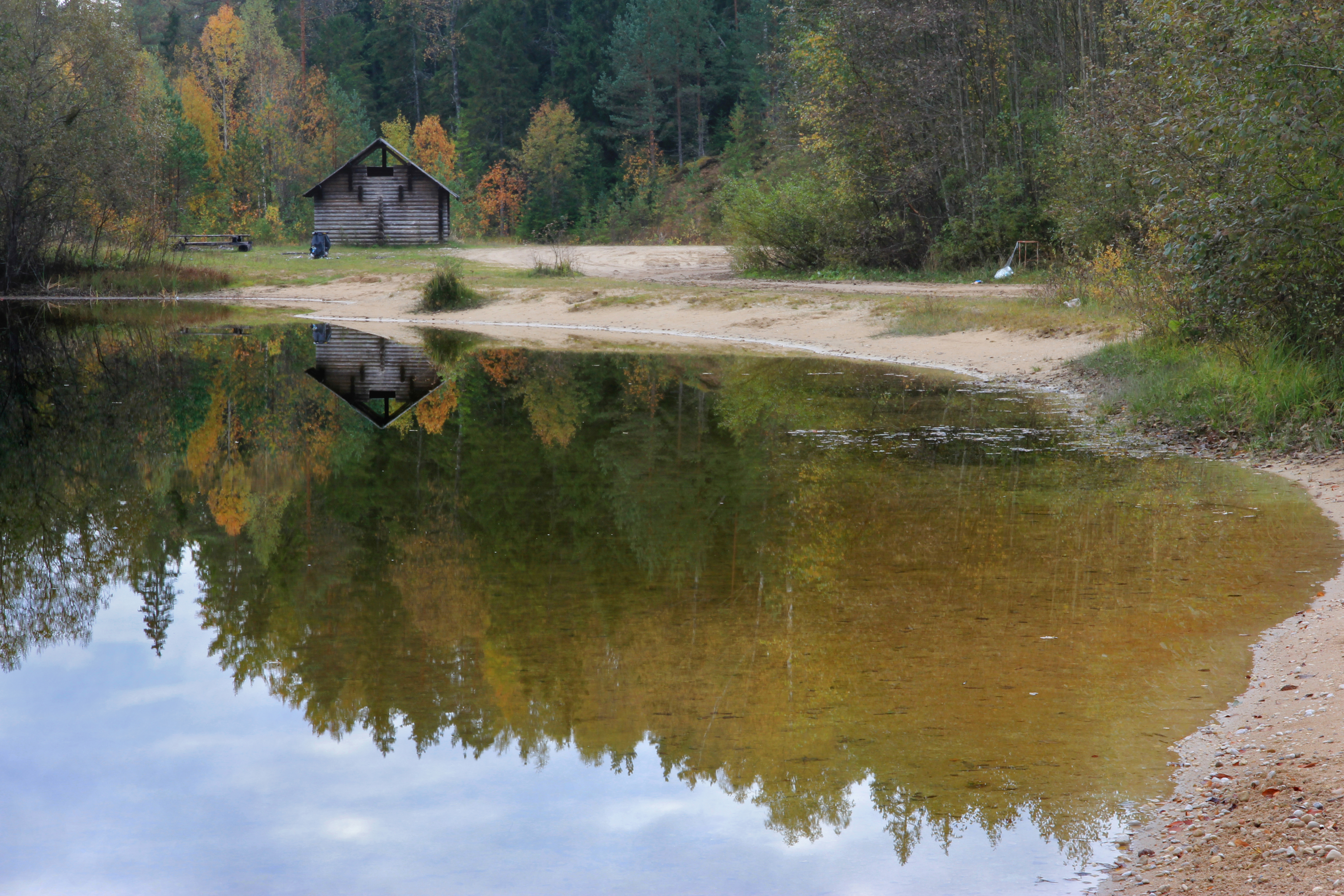
- Seljajärv, a lake in Koluvere
- Interactive map of Koluvere
- Country: Estonia
- County: Lääne-Viru County
- Parish: Väike-Maarja Parish
- Time zone: UTC+2 (EET)
  - Summer (DST): UTC+3 (EEST)

Koluvere is a village in Väike-Maarja Parish, Lääne-Viru County, in northeastern Estonia. Prior to the administrative reform of Estonian local governments in 2017, the village was located in to Rakke Parish.

Koluvere is located by Piibe Road between Piibe and Vägeva. The village borders the Endla Nature Reserve to the south and the Seljamäe Conservation Area to the north.
