= Liivaküla, Lääne-Viru County =

Village in Estonia

Liivaküla
- Village
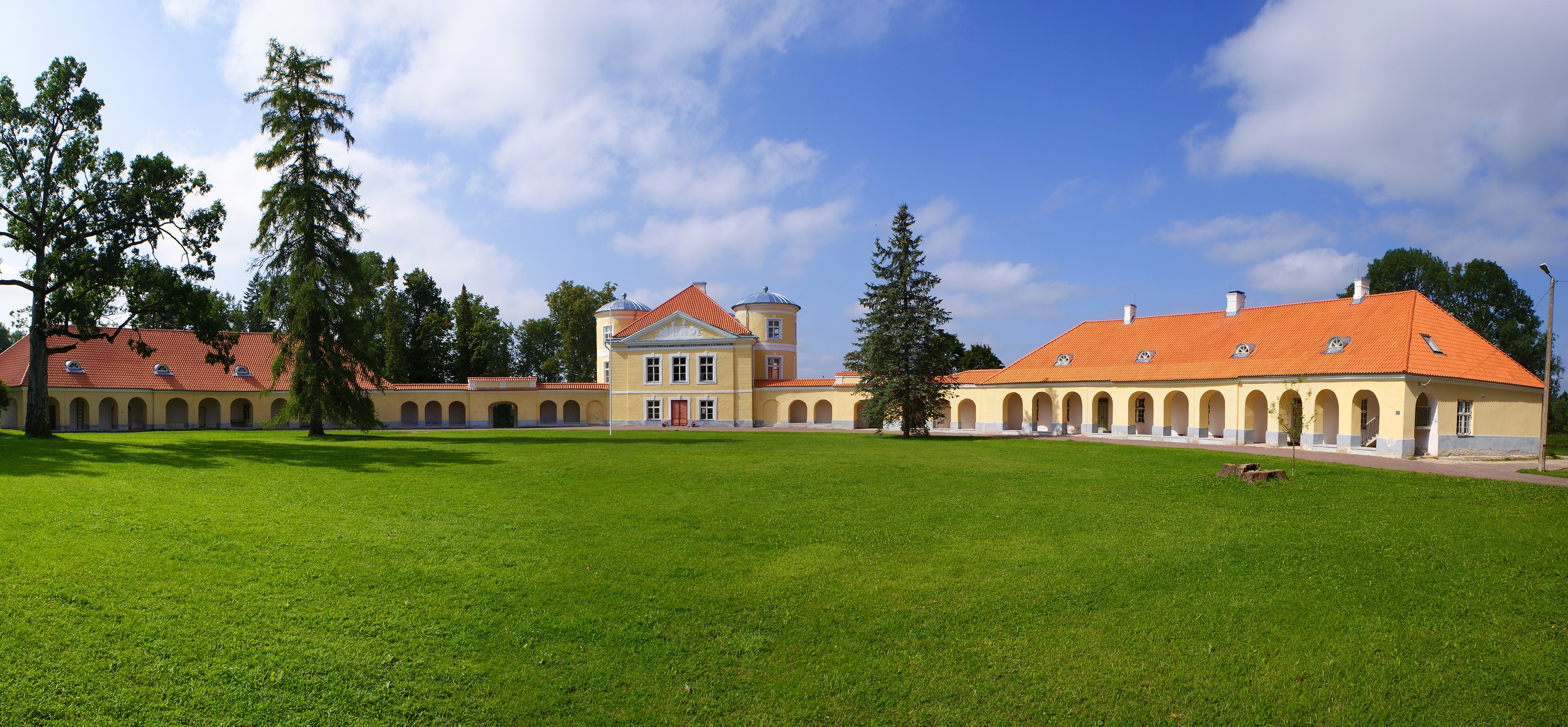
- Kiltsi Manor in Liivaküla.

- Location in Estonia
- Coordinates: 59°04′23″N 26°13′25″E
- Country: Estonia
- County: Lääne-Viru County
- Municipality: Väike-Maarja Parish

Population (01.01.2011)
  - Total: 79

Liivaküla is a village in Väike-Maarja Parish, Lääne-Viru County, in northeastern Estonia. It has a population of 79 (as of 1 January 2011).

The Kiltsi Manor, home of famous navigator Adam Johann von Krusenstern, is located in Liivaküla village.
