= Villakvere =

Village in Estonia

Coordinates: 58°54′N 26°24′E

- Village
- Interactive map of Villakvere
- Country: Estonia
- County: Lääne-Viru County
- Parish: Väike-Maarja Parish
- Time zone: UTC+2 (EET)
  - Summer (DST): UTC+3 (EEST)

Villakvere is a village in Väike-Maarja Parish, Lääne-Viru County, in northeastern Estonia.

Villakvere is situated within the rural landscape of Väike-Maarja Parish, an area with a long settlement history. The parish's official history records human occupation in the Pandivere Upland from at least the first century AD, while written references to settlements in the surrounding area date from the 13th century. Väike-Maarja church parish was established in the 14th century, contributing to the development of the wider region as an administrative and religious centre.
