= Suure-Rakke, Lääne-Viru County =

Village in Estonia

Coordinates: 58°21′N 26°11′E

Suure-Rakke
- Village
- Interactive map of Suure-Rakke
- Country: Estonia
- County: Lääne-Viru County
- Parish: Väike-Maarja Parish
- Time zone: UTC+2 (EET)
  - Summer (DST): UTC+3 (EEST)

Suure-Rakke is a village in Väike-Maarja Parish, Lääne-Viru County, in northeastern Estonia.
