= Jäätma, Väike-Maarja Parish =

Village in Estonia

Coordinates: 58°55′21″N 26°24′51″E

Jäätma
- Village
- Interactive map of Jäätma
- Country: Estonia
- County: Lääne-Viru County
- Parish: Väike-Maarja Parish
- Time zone: UTC+2 (EET)
  - Summer (DST): UTC+3 (EEST)

Jäätma is a village in Väike-Maarja Parish, Lääne-Viru County, in northeastern Estonia.
