= Mäiste =

Village in Estonia

Coordinates: 58°56′36″N 26°21′28″E

- Village
- Interactive map of Mäiste
- Country: Estonia
- County: Lääne-Viru County
- Parish: Väike-Maarja Parish
- Time zone: UTC+2 (EET)
  - Summer (DST): UTC+3 (EEST)

Mäiste is a village in Väike-Maarja Parish, Lääne-Viru County, in northeastern Estonia.
