= Kiltsi Manor =

Manor in Estonia

Coordinates: 59°4′39.01″N 26°11′39.65″E

- Kiltsi mõis
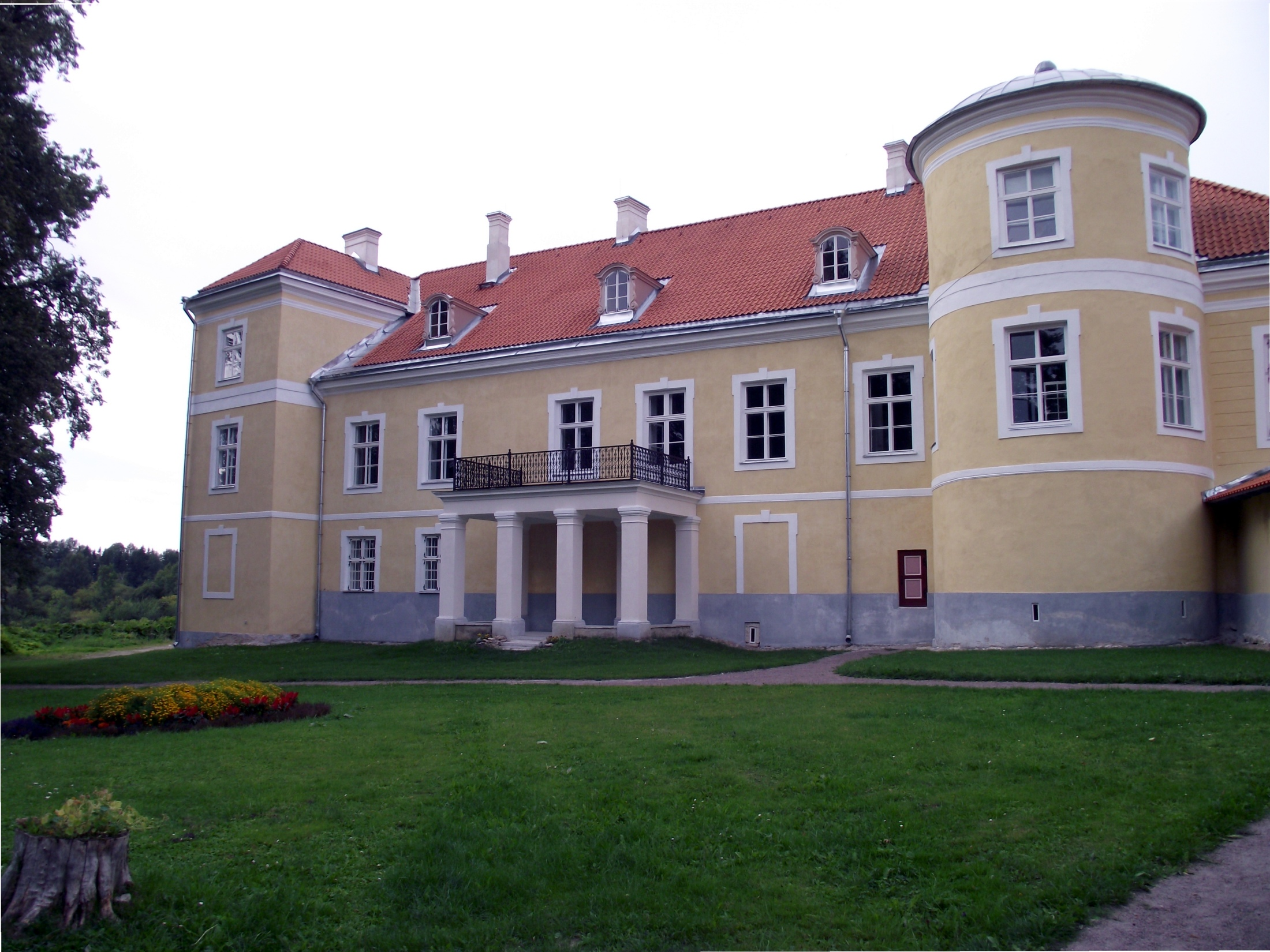
- View of Kiltsi Manor from the right
- Interactive map of the Kiltsi Manor area
- Alternative names: Schloß Aß, Schloss Ass, Gilsenhof

General information
- Location: Väike-Maarja Parish, Estonia
- Construction started: 1784
- Construction stopped: 1790
- Renovated: 2008-2010

Kiltsi Manor (Estonian: Kiltsi mõis) (also known as Schloß Aß, Schloss Ass, or Gilsenhof) is a knight’s manor in Väike-Maarja Parish, present day Lääne-Viru County, Estonia. It is number 16079 on the Estonian State Register of Cultural Monuments.

== History ==
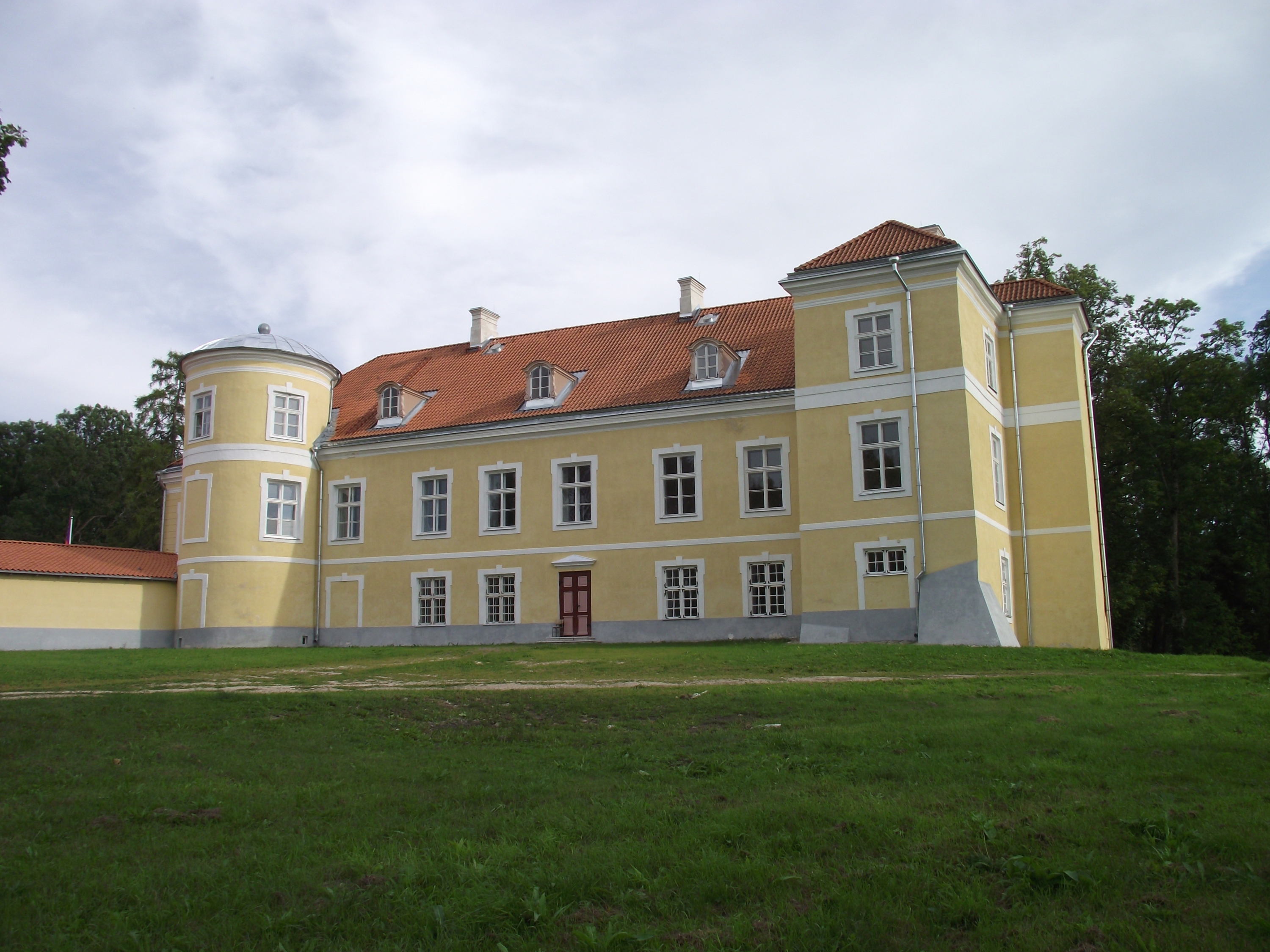
View from the left

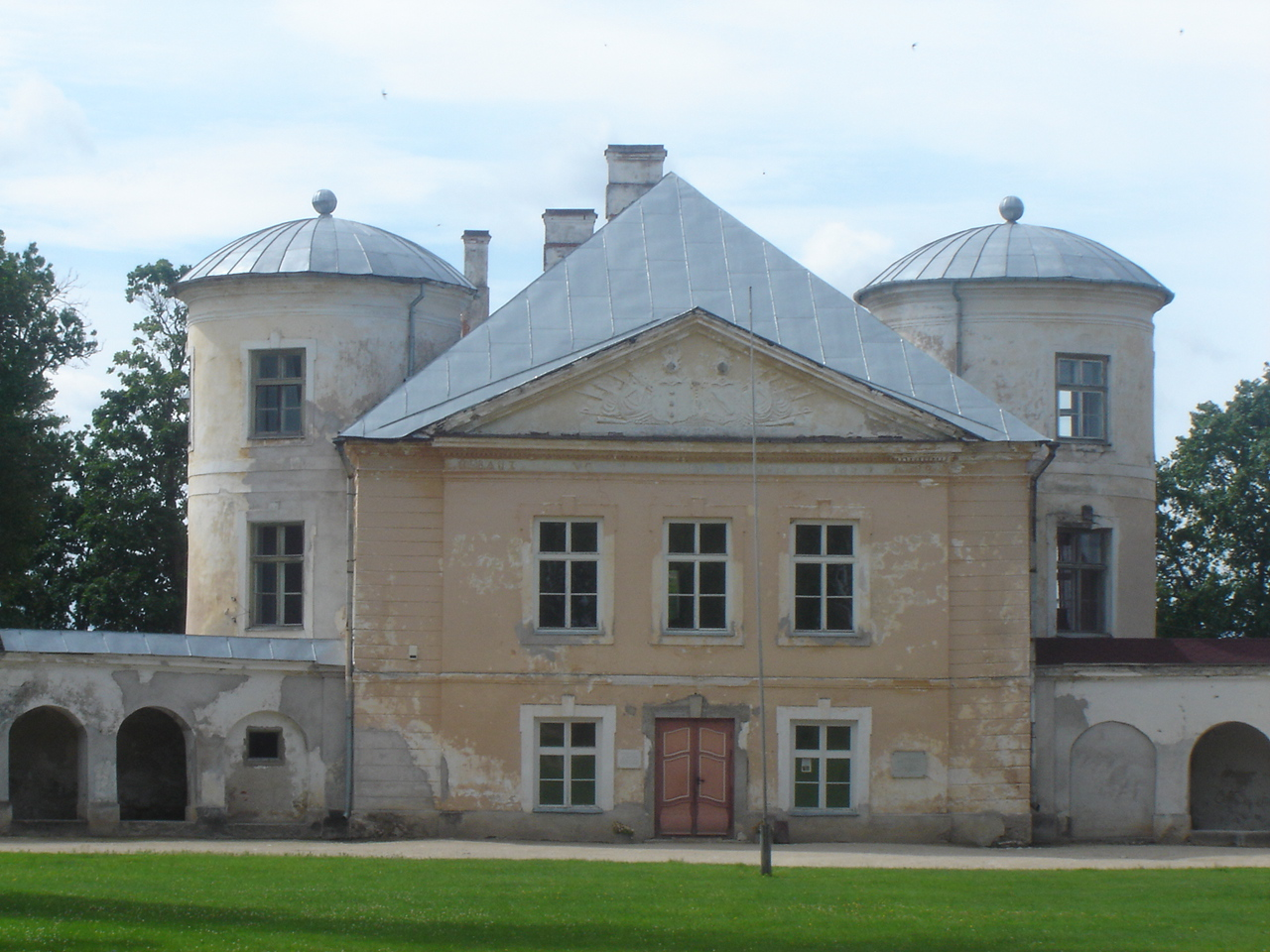
Kiltsi Manor main building before restoration work in 2008–2010

Kiltsi Manor is first recorded in 1466. It is believed to have been built in the 14th or 15th century in what was then Kiltsi Castle which was destroyed in the Livonian War. In the Middle Ages Kiltsi belonged to the Gilsens, from which it gets its German name Gilsenhof. In the 17th century, Kiltsi was in Asseri parish, and was thus under he ownership of the Uexküll, Zoeged, Mannteuffel, and Rosen families. In 1784 Kiltsi manor was acquired by Major Hermann Johann von Beckendorff, who built a new main house in early classical style (with non-classical turrets) within the manor walls in 1790. From 1816 the manor belonged to famed explorer and scholar Adam Johann von Krusenstern until his death at Kiltsi in 1846. The manor stayed in the Krusenstern family until the early part of the 20th century.

The manor’s last private owner was Alfred von Uexküll-Gyldenband. Since 1920 the manor has been home to a school.

== Gallery ==
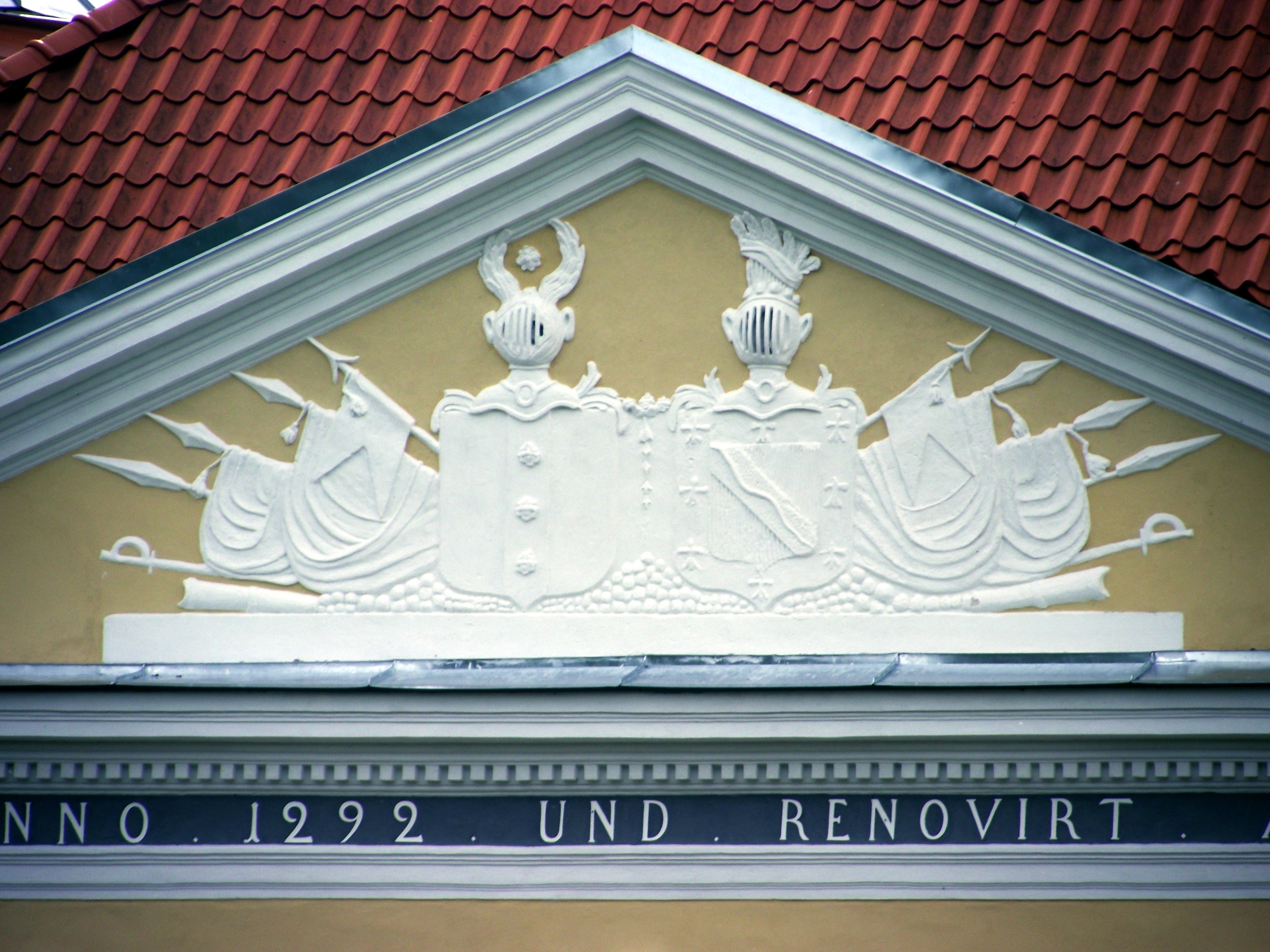
Kiltsi main building with the Benckendorff and Brevern arms.

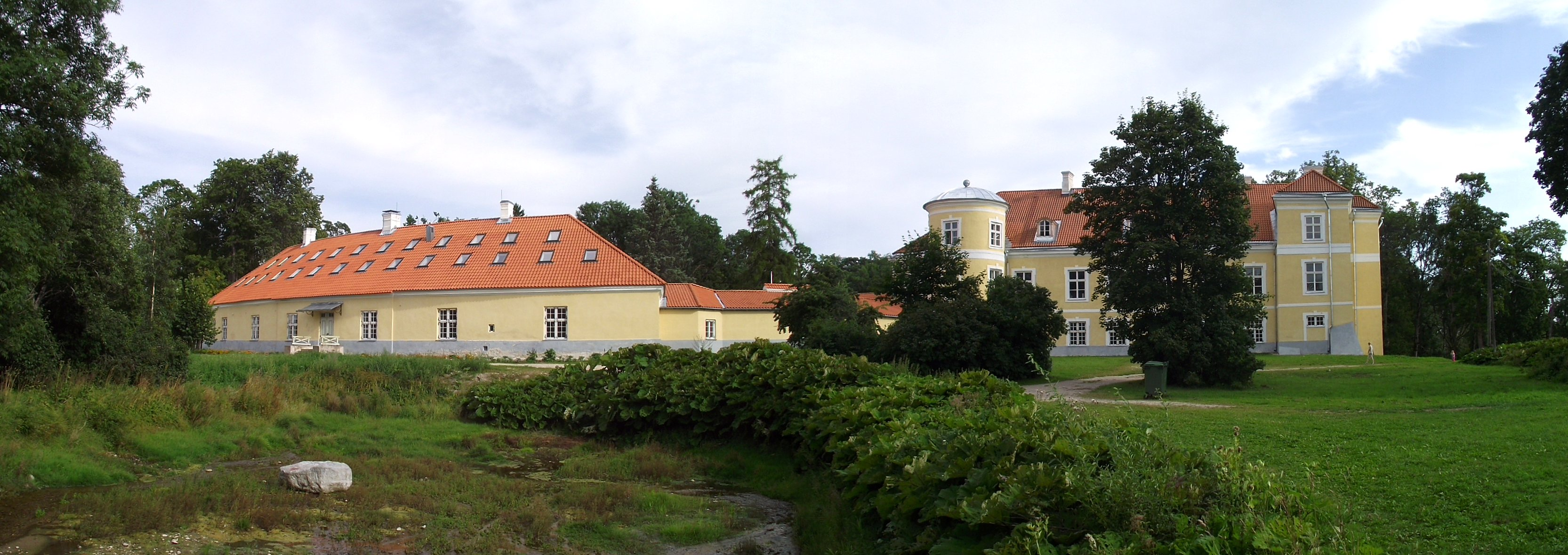
Kiltsi Manor

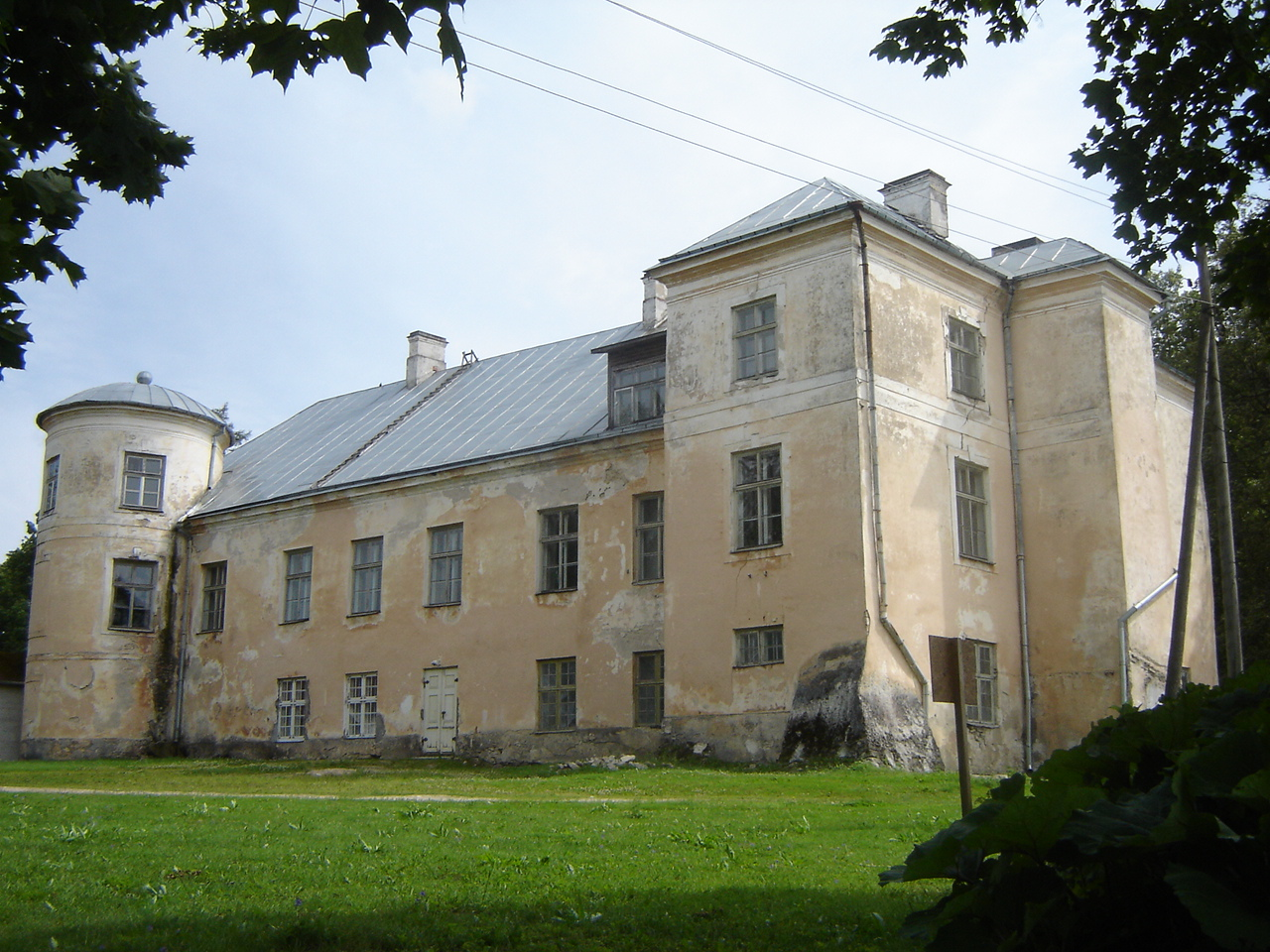
The manor seen from the right before the restoration work of 2008–2010

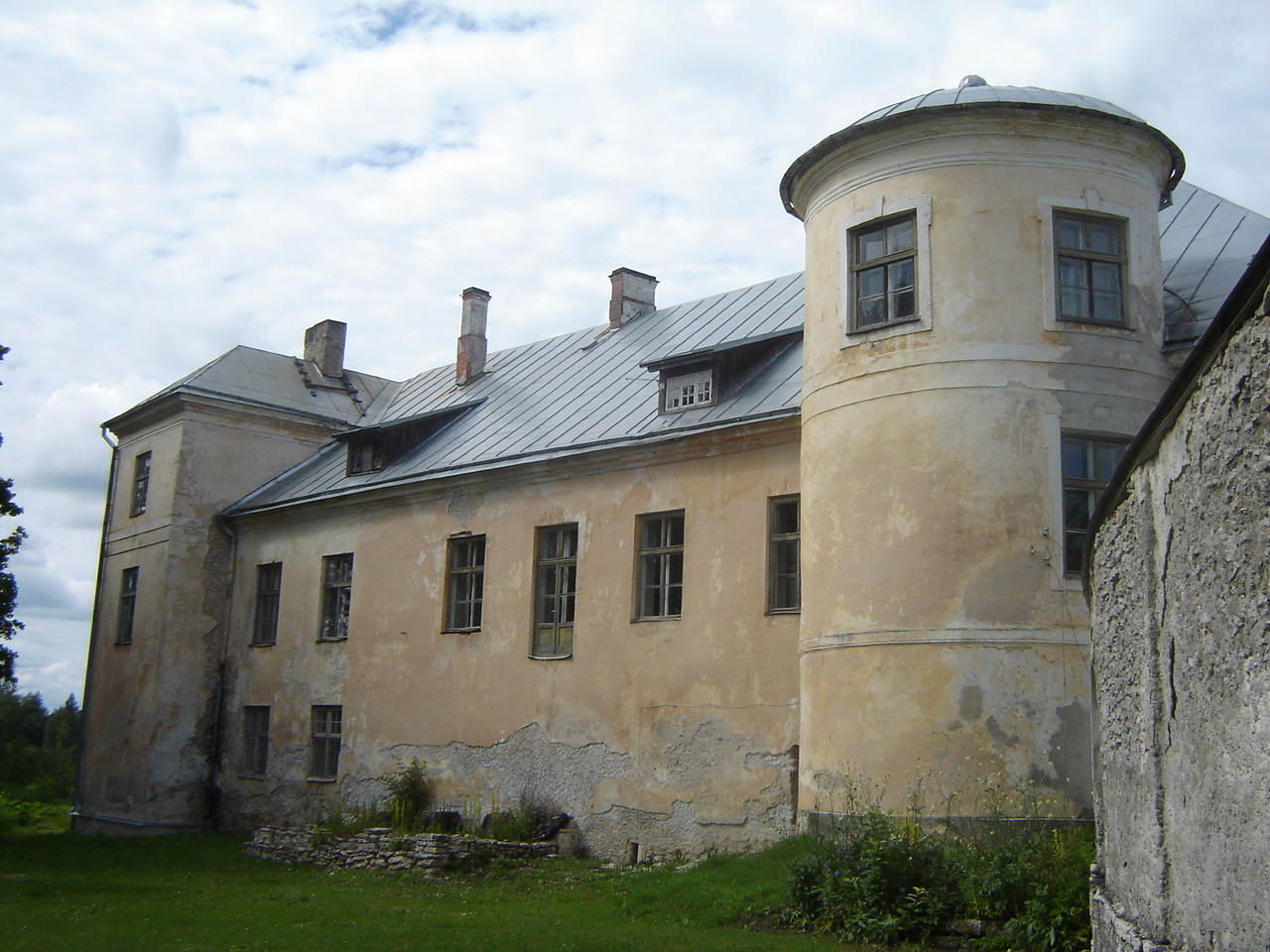
The manor seen from the left before the restoration work of 2008–2010

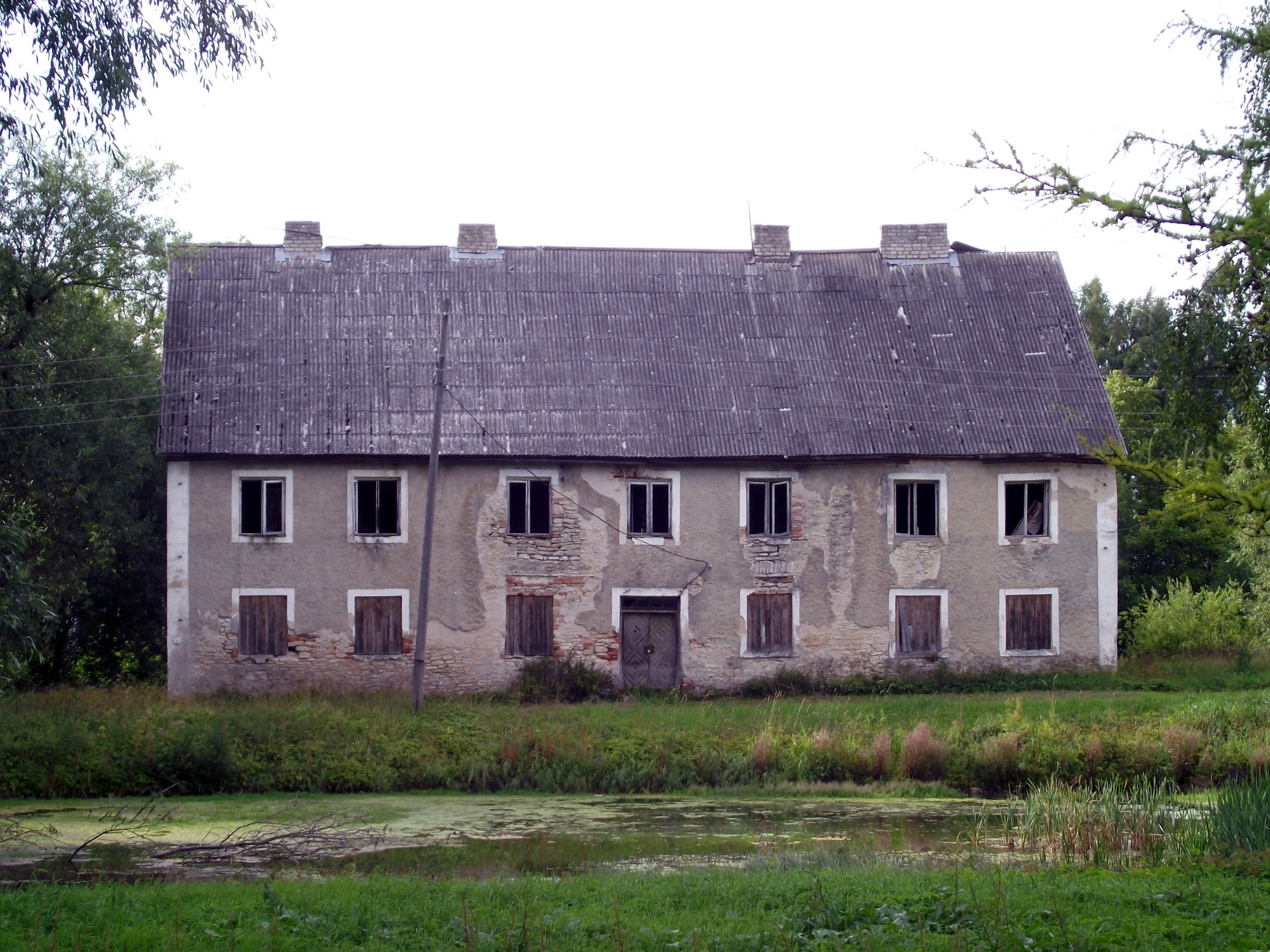
Servants' quarters

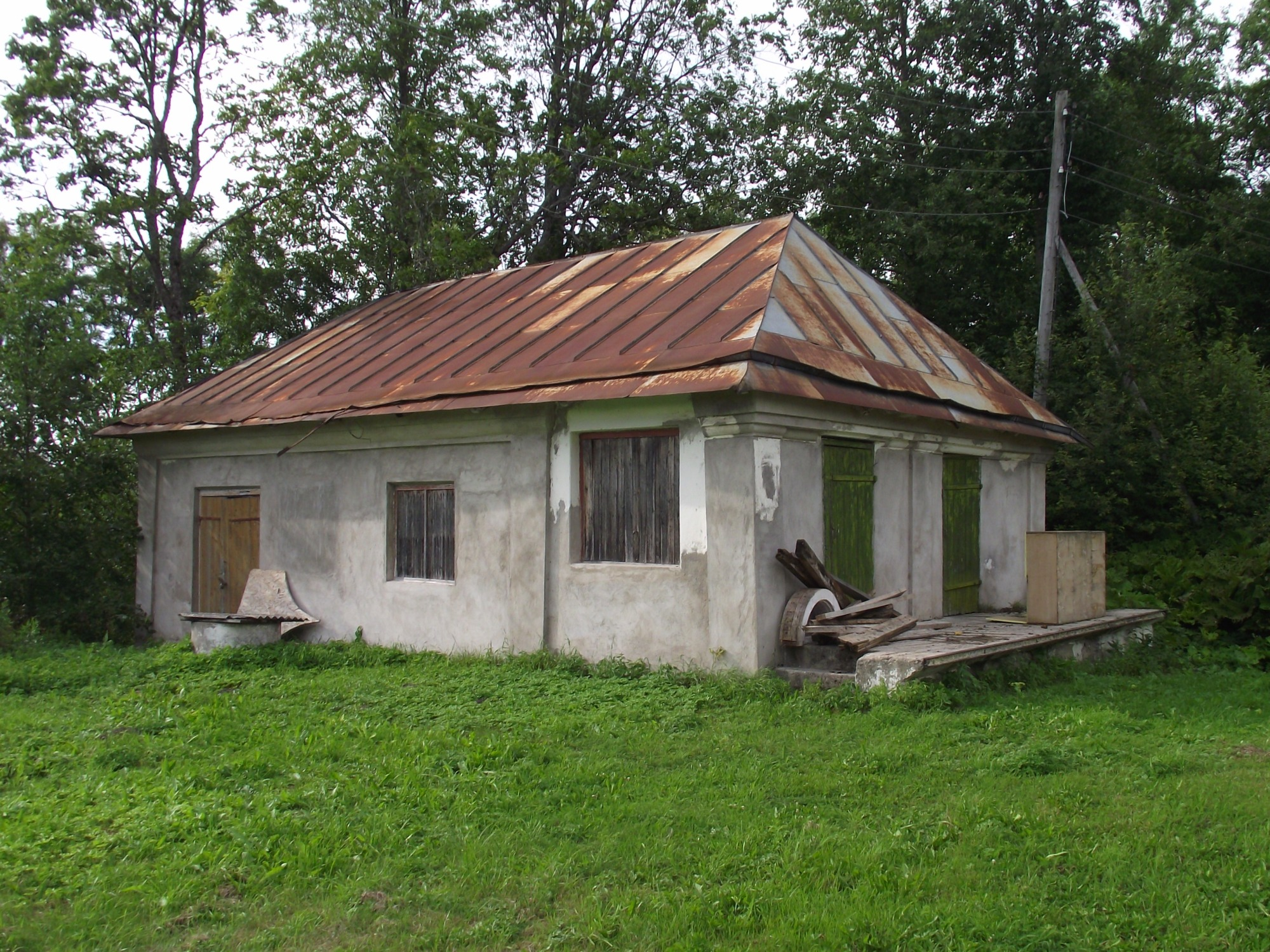
The dairy kitchen

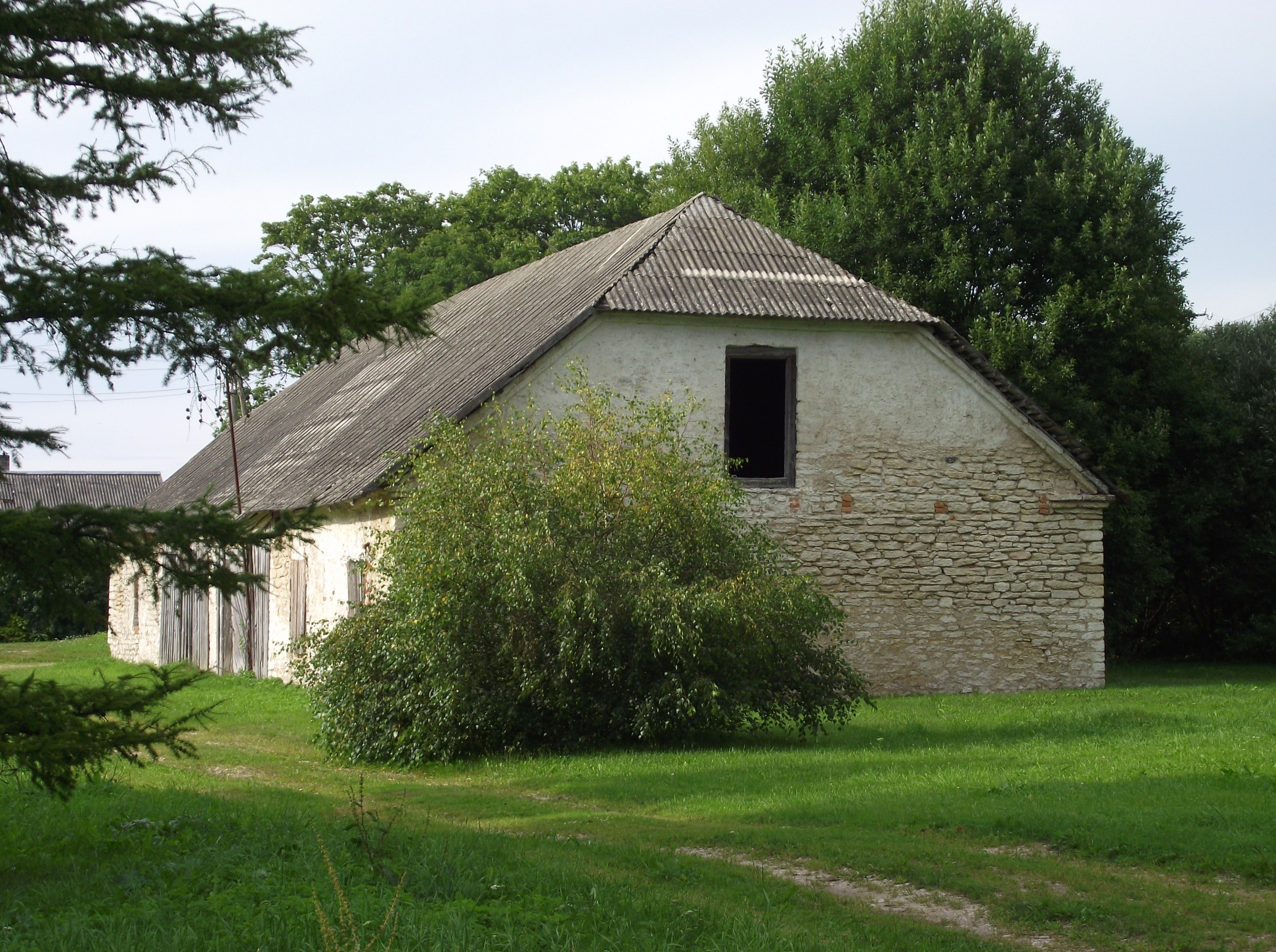
Stables

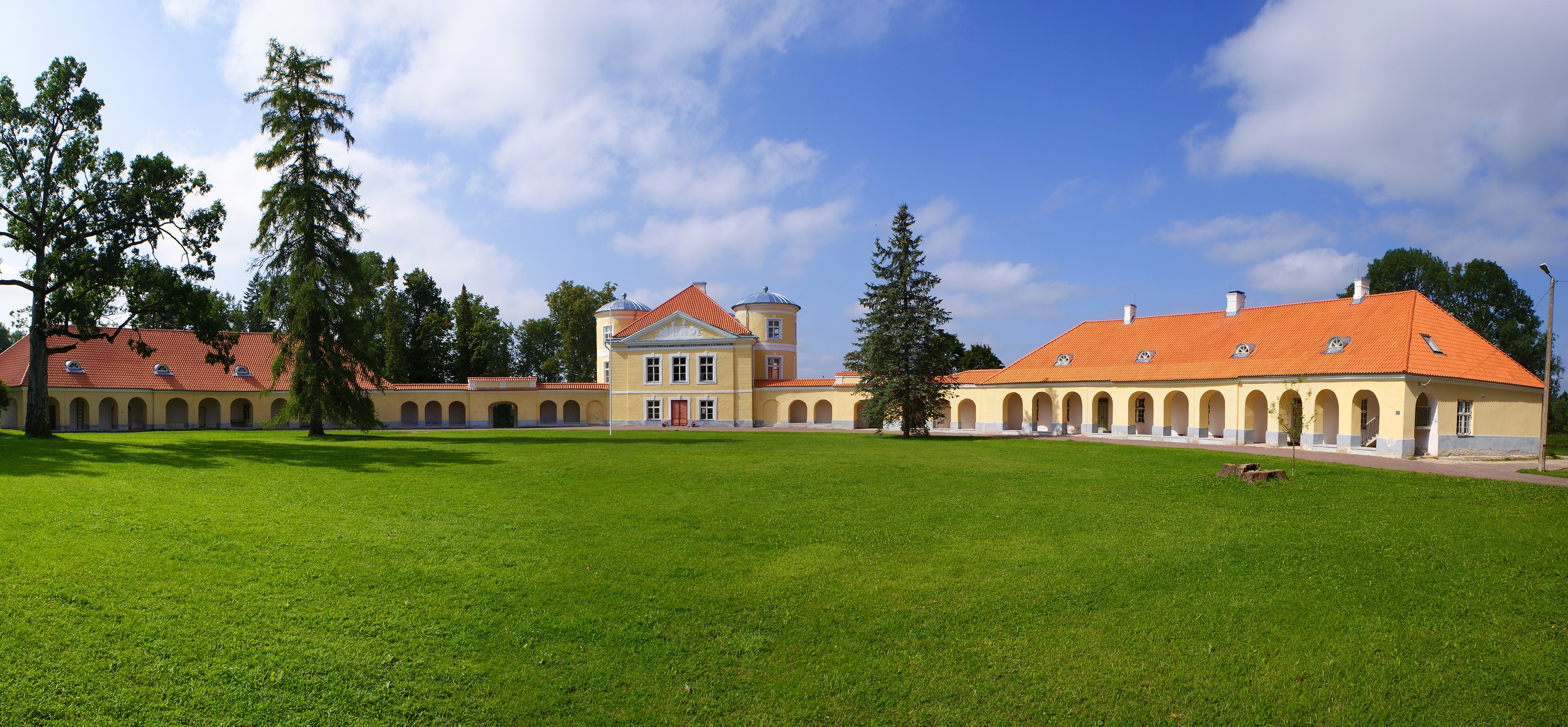
Panorama of the manor

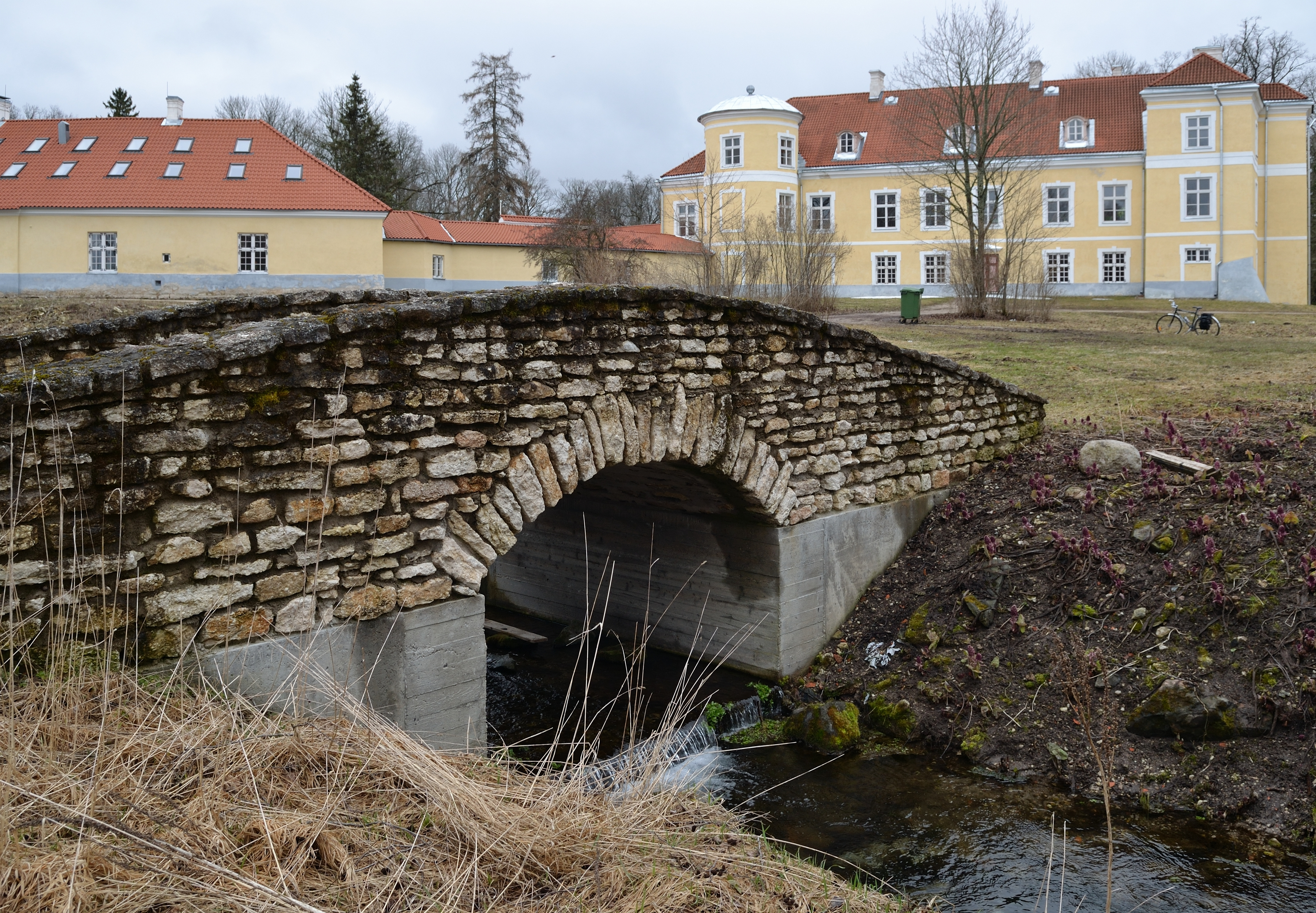
Stone bridge in Kiltsi manor park

== See also ==
- List of palaces and manor houses in Estonia
