= Aavere, Väike-Maarja Parish =

Village in Estonia

Aavere
- Village
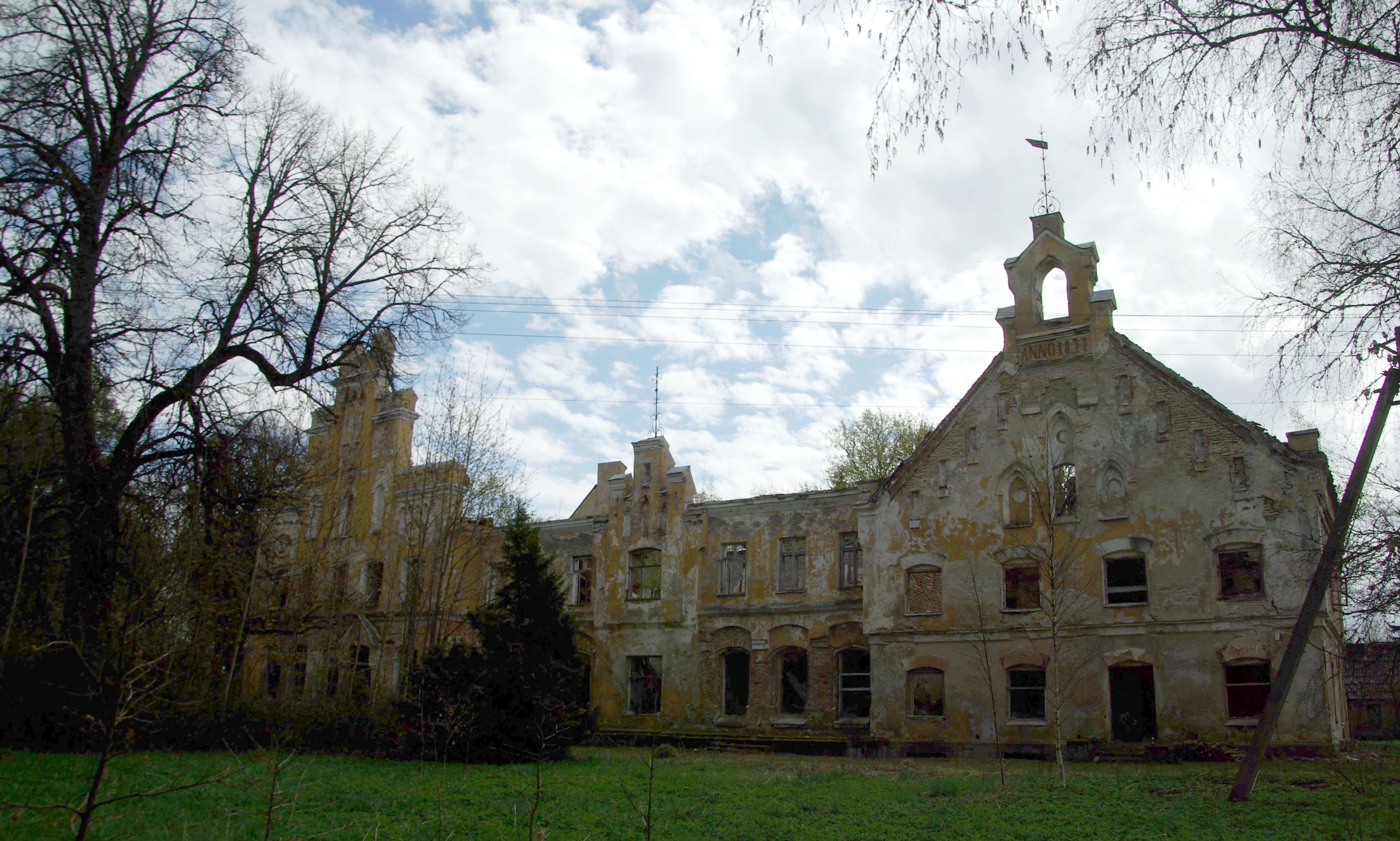
- Ruins of Aavere Manor

- Location within Estonia Location within Europe
- Coordinates: 59°04′21″N 26°03′21″E
- Country: Estonia
- County: Lääne-Viru County
- Municipality: Väike-Maarja Parish
- Time zone: UTC+2 (EET)
  - Summer (DST): UTC+3 (EEST)

Aavere (German: Afer) is a village in Väike-Maarja Parish, Lääne-Viru County, in northeastern Estonia.
