= Orguse, Lääne-Viru County =

Village in Estonia

Coordinates: 59°03′36″N 26°22′16″E

Orguse
- Village
- Interactive map of Orguse
- Country: Estonia
- County: Lääne-Viru County
- Parish: Väike-Maarja Parish
- Time zone: UTC+2 (EET)
  - Summer (DST): UTC+3 (EEST)

Simuna meteorite crater
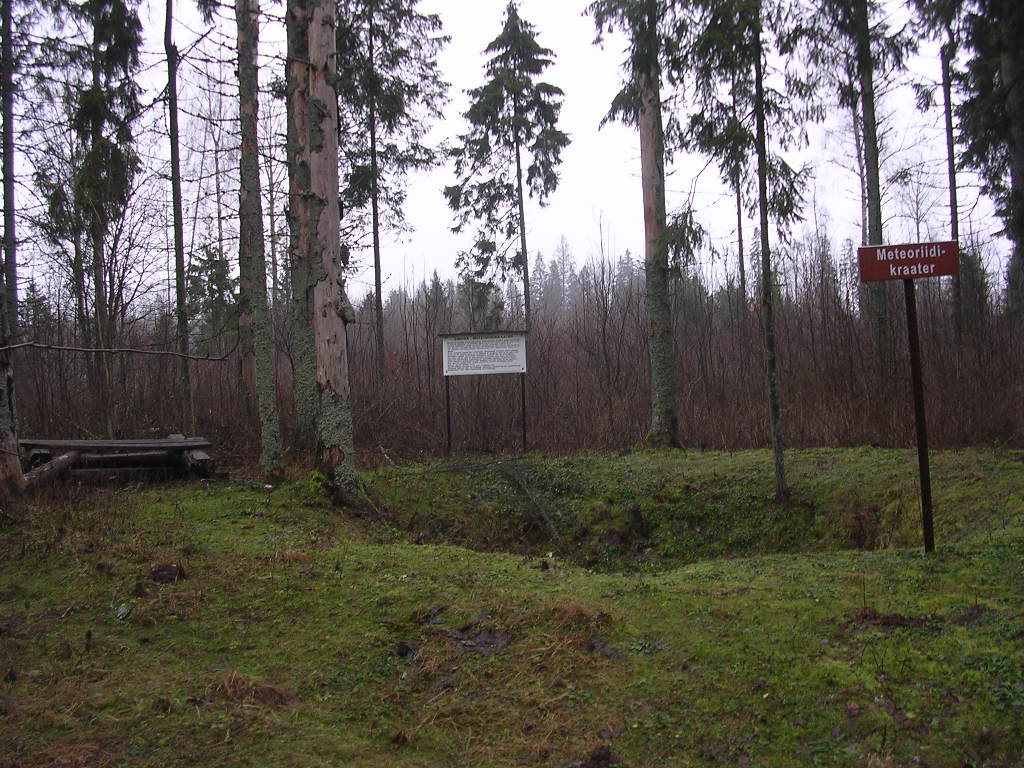
- Simuna meteorite crater

- Location within Estonia
- Location: Estonia

Impact crater structure
- Diameter: 8.5 m (30 ft)
- Depth: 2 m (7 ft)

Orguse is a village in Väike-Maarja Parish, Lääne-Viru County, in northeastern Estonia.

The Simuna meteorite crater is located in this village. Its diameter is 8.5 m (30 ft) and its depth 2 m (7 ft). Reportedly, it was formed on 1 June 1937, when one part of the blasted bolide fell into the ground.
