= Võivere =

Village in Estonia

- Village
- Location in Estonia
- Coordinates: 59°03′25″N 26°20′35″E
- Country: Estonia
- County: Lääne-Viru County
- Municipality: Väike-Maarja Parish

Population (01.01.2011)
  - Total: 49

Võivere (German: Woibifer) is a village in Väike-Maarja Parish, Lääne-Viru County, in northeastern Estonia. It has a population of 49 (as of 1 January 2011).

One of the points of the Struve Geodetic Arc is located in Võivere.
