= Piibe =

Village in Estonia

Coordinates: 58°57′N 26°09′E

- Village
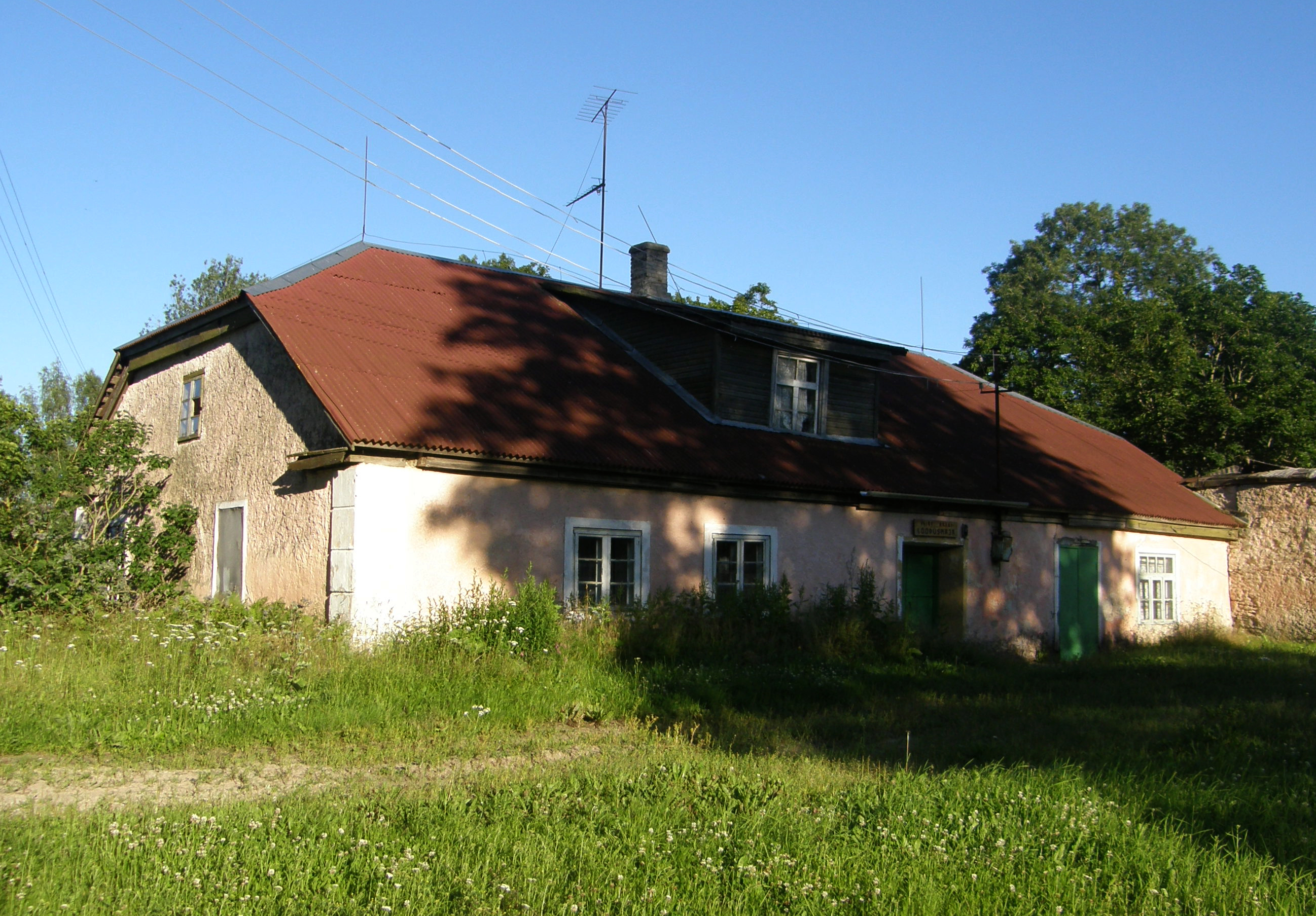
- Interactive map of Piibe
- Country: Estonia
- County: Lääne-Viru County
- Parish: Väike-Maarja Parish
- Time zone: UTC+2 (EET)
  - Summer (DST): UTC+3 (EEST)

Piibe (German: Piep) is a village in Väike-Maarja Parish, Lääne-Viru County, in northeastern Estonia.

Well-known biologist, explorer and founder of embryology, Karl Ernst von Baer (1792–1876), was born in Piibe Manor and owned the complex from 1834 to 1866.
