= Kurtna, Lääne-Viru County =

Village in Estonia

Coordinates: 59°03′48″N 26°19′13″E

Kurtna
- Village
- Interactive map of Kurtna
- Country: Estonia
- County: Lääne-Viru County
- Parish: Väike-Maarja Parish
- Time zone: UTC+2 (EET)
  - Summer (DST): UTC+3 (EEST)

Kurtna is a village in Väike-Maarja Parish, Lääne-Viru County, Estonia.
