= Laho =

Laho may refer to:

- Laho, Põlva Parish, village in Põlva Parish, Põlva County, Estonia
- Laho, Räpina Parish, village in Räpina Parish, Põlva County, Estonia
- Lake Laho, lake in Säässaare village, Põlva Parish, Põlva County, Estonia
- Marc Laho (born 1965), Belgian tenor opera singer
- Lahu, ethnic group of Southeast Asia and China
- "Laho" (song), by Shallipopi, 2025
