= Vorsti, Lääne-Viru County =

Village in Estonia

Coordinates: 59°03′N 26°10′E

Vorsti
- Village
- Interactive map of Vorsti
- Country: Estonia
- County: Lääne-Viru County
- Parish: Väike-Maarja Parish
- Time zone: UTC+2 (EET)
  - Summer (DST): UTC+3 (EEST)

Vorsti (German: Sternhof) is a village in Väike-Maarja Parish, Lääne-Viru County, in northeastern Estonia.
