= Kärsa, Lääne-Viru County =

Village in Estonia

Coordinates: 59°03′26″N 26°17′21″E

Kärsa
- Village
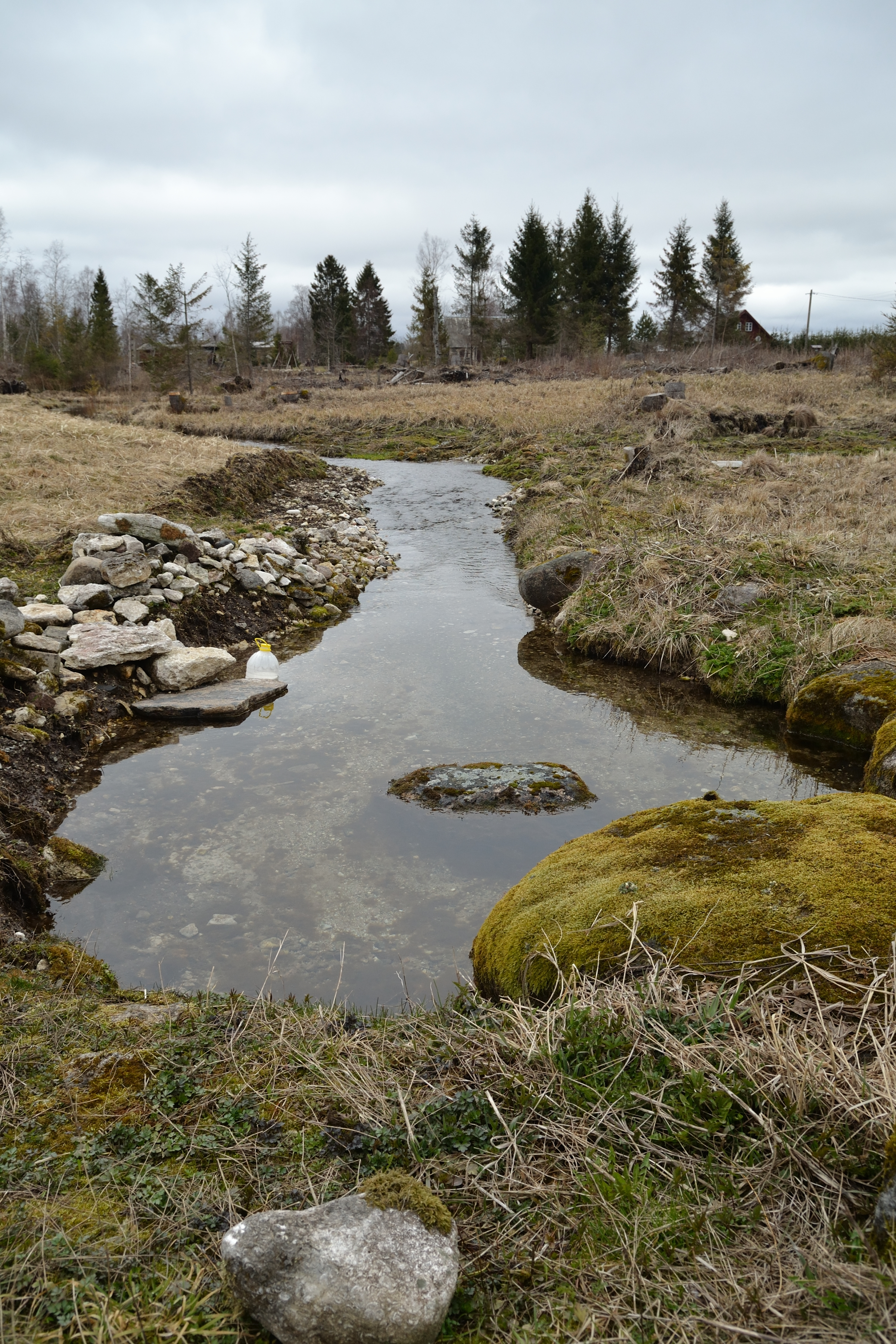
- Source of the Lindrehti springs
- Interactive map of Kärsa
- Country: Estonia
- County: Lääne-Viru County
- Parish: Väike-Maarja Parish
- Time zone: UTC+2 (EET)
  - Summer (DST): UTC+3 (EEST)

Kärsa (German: Kersell) is a village in Väike-Maarja Parish, Lääne-Viru County, in northeastern Estonia.
