= Triigi, Lääne-Viru County =

Village in Estonia

Coordinates: 59°06′N 26°19′E

Triigi
- Village
- Interactive map of Triigi
- Country: Estonia
- County: Lääne-Viru County
- Parish: Väike-Maarja Parish
- Time zone: UTC+2 (EET)
  - Summer (DST): UTC+3 (EEST)

Triigi (German: Ottenküll) is a village in Väike-Maarja Parish, Lääne-Viru County, in northeastern Estonia.
