= Liigvalla =

Village in Estonia

Coordinates: 59°00′N 26°09′E

- Village
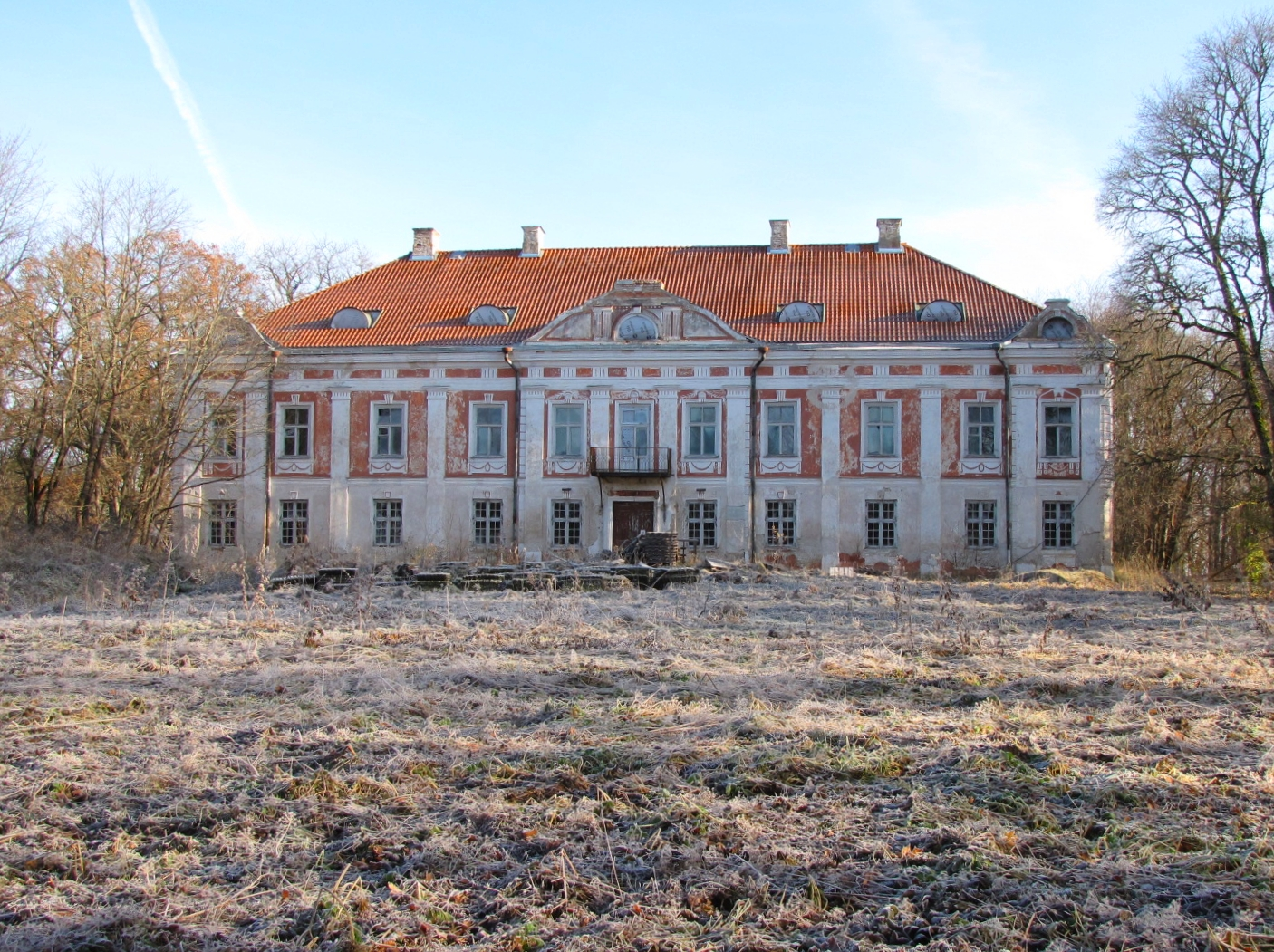
- Interactive map of Liigvalla
- Country: Estonia
- County: Lääne-Viru County
- Parish: Väike-Maarja Parish
- Time zone: UTC+2 (EET)
  - Summer (DST): UTC+3 (EEST)

Liigvalla (German: Löwenwolde) is a village in Väike-Maarja Parish, Lääne-Viru County in northeastern Estonia.
