= Uuemõisa, Lääne-Viru County =

Village in Estonia

Coordinates: 59°06′07″N 26°09′36″E

Uuemõisa
- Village
- Interactive map of Uuemõisa
- Country: Estonia
- County: Lääne-Viru County
- Parish: Väike-Maarja Parish
- Time zone: UTC+2 (EET)
  - Summer (DST): UTC+3 (EEST)

Uuemõisa is a village in Väike-Maarja Parish, Lääne-Viru County, in northeastern Estonia.
