= Väike-Maarja Parish =

Municipality of Estonia

Coordinates: 59°7′46″N 26°15′9″E

Väike-Maarja Parish Väike-Maarja vald
- Municipality of Estonia
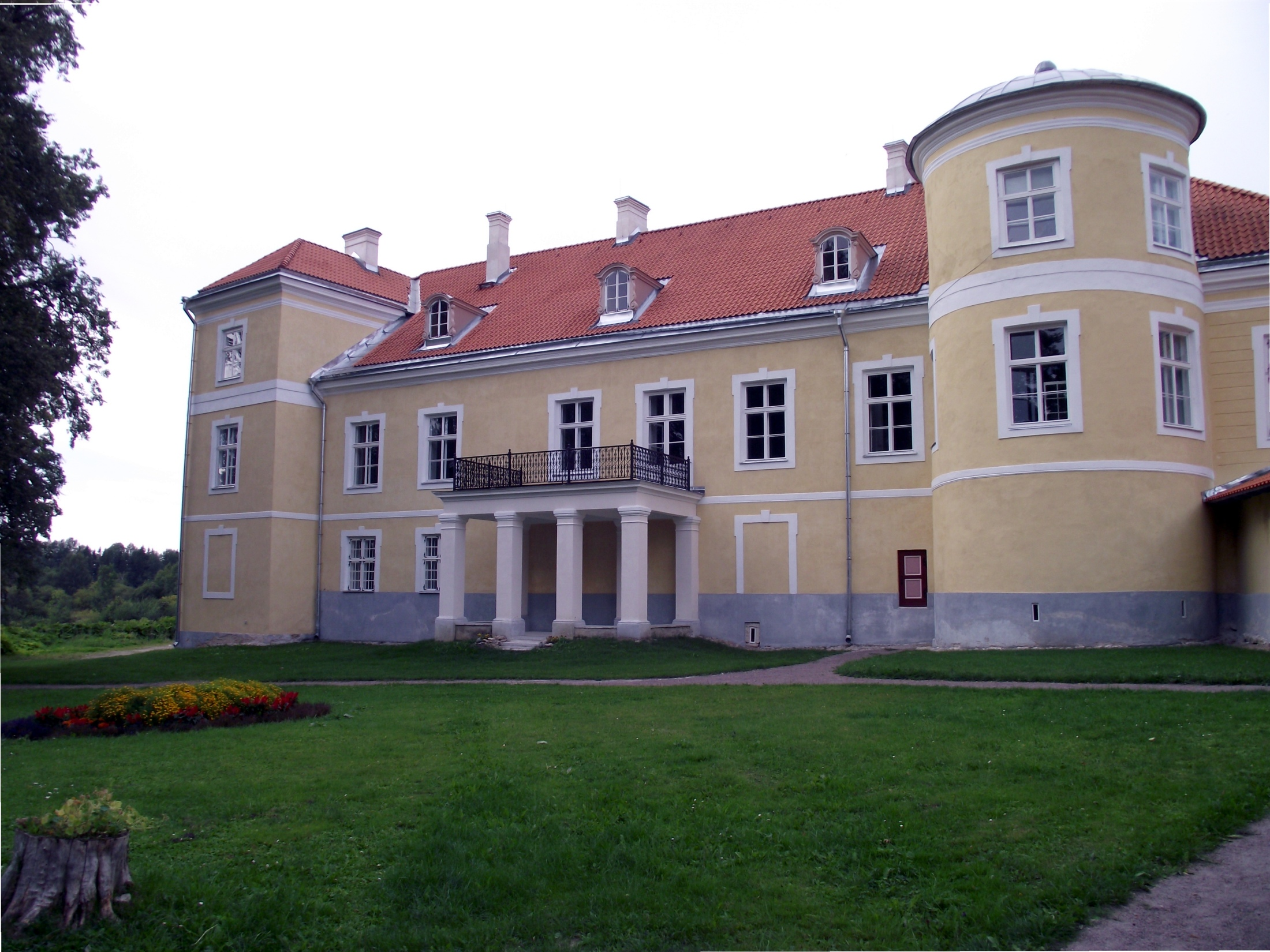
- Kiltsi manor

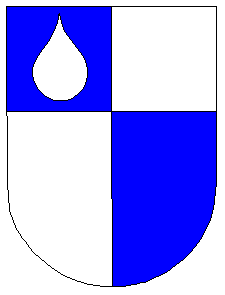
- Flag Coat of arms

- Väike-Maarja Parish within Lääne-Viru County.
- Country: Estonia
- County: Lääne-Viru County
- Administrative centre: Väike-Maarja

Area
  - Total: 457.39 km^{2} (176.60 sq mi)

Population (01.01.2009)
  - Total: 5,421
  - Density: 11.85/km^{2} (30.70/sq mi)
- ISO 3166 code: EE-928
- Website: www.v-maarja.ee

Väike-Maarja Parish (Estonian: Väike-Maarja vald) is a rural municipality of Estonia, in Lääne-Viru County. It has a population of 5,421 (as of 1 January 2009) and an area of 457.39 km².

== Settlements ==
Small boroughs

Kiltsi, Rakke, Simuna, Väike-Maarja

Villages

Aavere - Aburi - Äntu - Ärina - Avanduse - Avispea - Ebavere - Edru - Eipri - Emumäe - Hirla - Imukvere - Jäätma - Kaavere - Kadiküla - Kamariku - Kännuküla - Kärsa - Käru - Kellamäe - Kitsemetsa - Koila - Koluvere - Kõpsta - Koonu - Kurtna - Lahu - Lammasküla - Lasinurme - Liigvalla - Liivaküla - Määri - Mäiste - Mõisamaa - Müüriku - Nadalama - Nõmme - Nõmmküla - Olju - Orguse - Padaküla - Pandivere - Piibe - Pikevere - Pudivere - Raeküla - Raigu - Räitsvere - Rastla - Salla - Sandimetsa - Sootaguse - Suure-Rakke - Tammiku - Triigi - Uuemõisa - Väike-Rakke - Väike-Tammiku - Vao - Varangu - Villakvere - Võivere - Vorsti

== Climate ==
Climate data for Väike-Maarja, Estonia (1991-2020 normals, extremes 1962-present)
Month	Jan	Feb	Mar	Apr	May	Jun	Jul	Aug	Sep	Oct	Nov	Dec	Year
Record high °C (°F)	8.2 (46.8)	10.5 (50.9)	16.1 (61.0)	25.6 (78.1)	30.4 (86.7)	31.1 (88.0)	33.7 (92.7)	34.5 (94.1)	29.5 (85.1)	20.5 (68.9)	14.1 (57.4)	10.5 (50.9)	34.5 (94.1)
Mean daily maximum °C (°F)	−2.4 (27.7)	−2.6 (27.3)	1.8 (35.2)	9.6 (49.3)	16.2 (61.2)	19.8 (67.6)	22.5 (72.5)	21.1 (70.0)	15.6 (60.1)	8.3 (46.9)	2.5 (36.5)	−0.6 (30.9)	9.3 (48.8)
Daily mean °C (°F)	−4.7 (23.5)	−5.3 (22.5)	−1.8 (28.8)	4.5 (40.1)	10.4 (50.7)	14.5 (58.1)	17.2 (63.0)	15.8 (60.4)	11.1 (52.0)	5.2 (41.4)	0.5 (32.9)	−2.7 (27.1)	5.4 (41.7)
Mean daily minimum °C (°F)	−7.5 (18.5)	−8.3 (17.1)	−5.4 (22.3)	0.0 (32.0)	4.5 (40.1)	9.0 (48.2)	11.8 (53.2)	10.9 (51.6)	7.0 (44.6)	2.2 (36.0)	−1.7 (28.9)	−5.0 (23.0)	1.5 (34.6)
Record low °C (°F)	−33.7 (−28.7)	−34.8 (−30.6)	−26.6 (−15.9)	−17.2 (1.0)	−6.6 (20.1)	−1.8 (28.8)	2.4 (36.3)	0.9 (33.6)	−5.4 (22.3)	−13.6 (7.5)	−23.7 (−10.7)	−36.2 (−33.2)	−36.2 (−33.2)
Average precipitation mm (inches)	46 (1.8)	35 (1.4)	34 (1.3)	34 (1.3)	44 (1.7)	76 (3.0)	75 (3.0)	87 (3.4)	63 (2.5)	76 (3.0)	57 (2.2)	50 (2.0)	684 (26.9)
Average precipitation days (≥ 1 mm)	12.6	10.1	9.2	8.5	7.6	10.9	10.0	11.3	10.6	13.3	12.8	13.6	130.5
Average relative humidity (%)	90	88	81	71	67	73	76	79	84	89	92	91	82
Source 1: Estonian Weather Service
Source 2: NOAA (precipitation days 1991-2020)

== Religion ==
Among the residents of Väike-Maarja Parish, 8.0% declared themselves to be Lutheran, 2.3% to be Orthodox while other Christian denominations make up 0.4% of the population. The majority of residents of the parish, 87.8% are religiously unaffiliated. 1.5 % of the population follows other religions or did not specify their religious affiliation.

== Notable people ==
- Magnus Georg Paucker (1787 in Simuna – 1855), a Baltic German astronomer and mathematician
- Karl Ernst von Baer (1792 in Piibe – 1876), a Baltic German scientist, explorer, naturalist, biologist, geologist and meteorologist.
- Friedrich Robert Faehlmann (1798 in Ao - 1850), writer, medical doctor and philologist.
- Werner Zoege von Manteuffel (1857 in Määri – 1926), Baltic German medical surgeon, an early advocate of sterilised gloves.
- Juhan Kukk (1885 in Käru – 1942), politician, Minister of Finance, 1919 to 1920
- Leo Sepp (1892 in Simuna – 1941), politician, businessman and writer; Minister of Finance, 1924 to 1927 and 1938 to 1940.
- Voldemar Karl Koht (1893 in Vao Parish – 1942), military officer, commander of the Armored Train Regiment
- Tuudur Vettik (1898 in Nadalama – 1982), composer, choral conductor and pedagogue, associated with the Estonian Song Festival
- Olev Roomet (1901 in Simuna - 1987), musician, a violin player, a player of the torupill (Estonian bagpipe)
- Kalju Karask (1931 in Rakke – 2011), an tenor opera and operetta singer and actor.
- Kuno Pajula (1924 in Käru – 2012), prelate, Archbishop of Tallinn
- Õnne Kurg (born 1973 in Rakke), cross-country skier, she competed in four events at the 1998 Winter Olympics

== Gallery ==
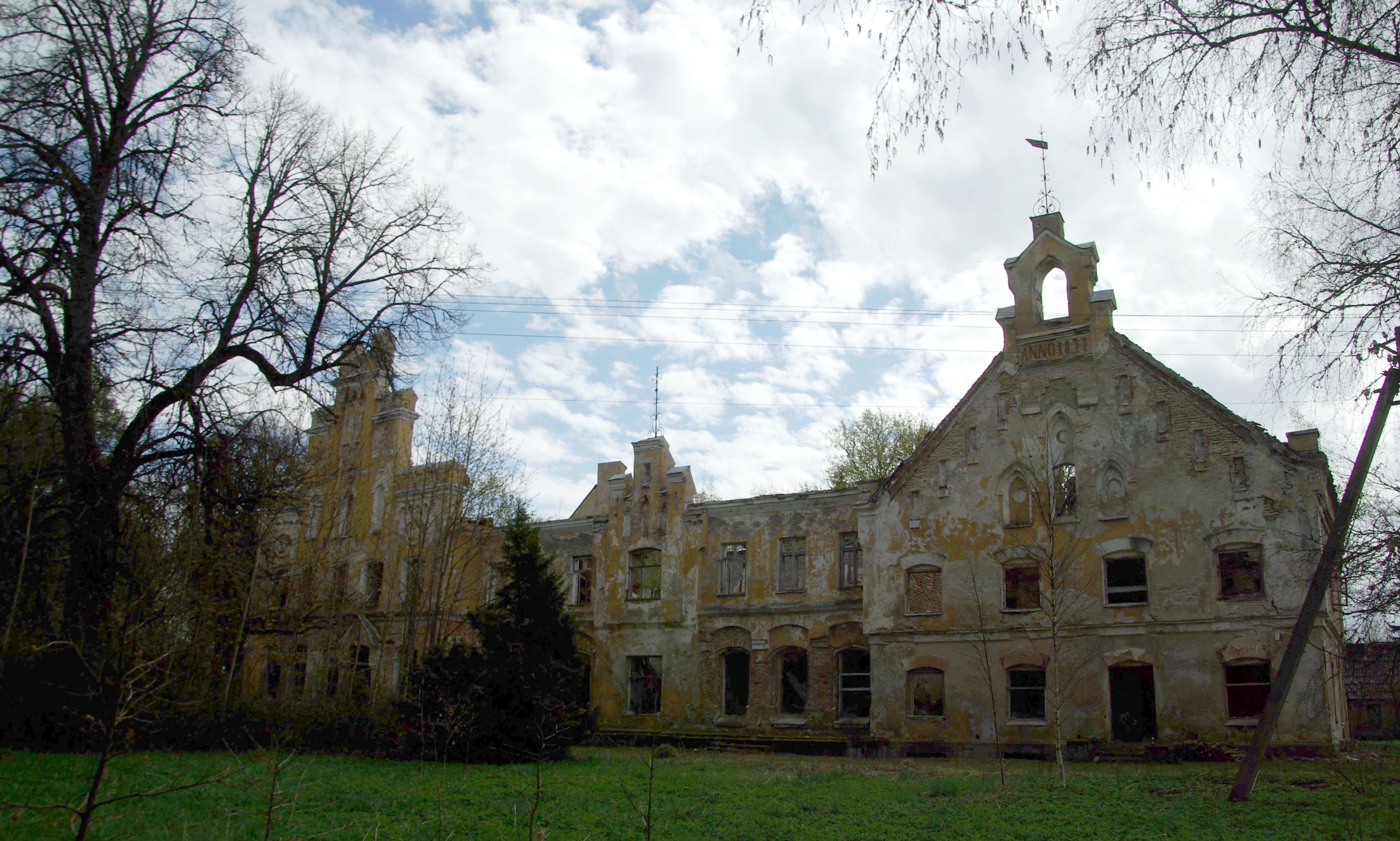
Ruins of Aavere manor

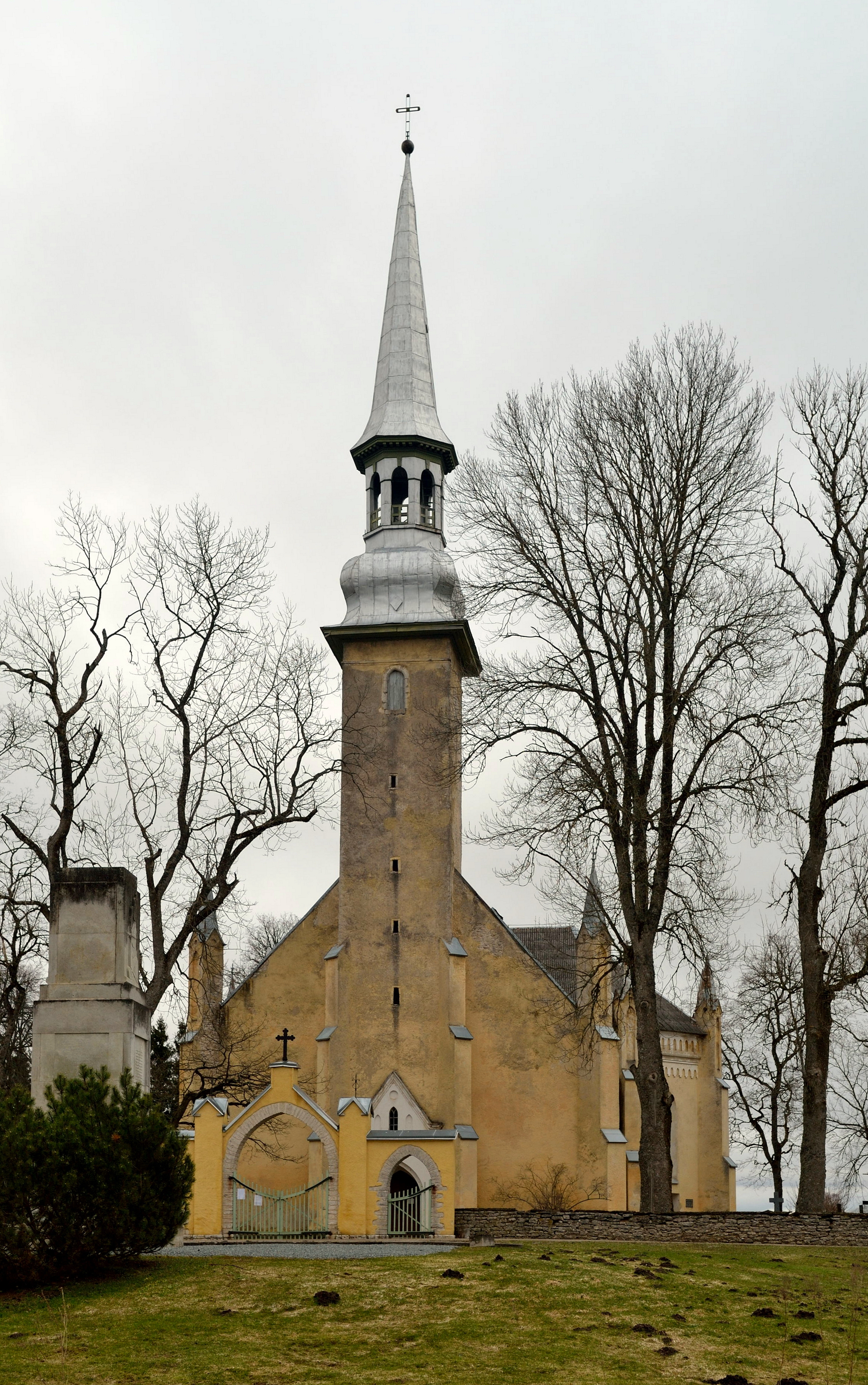
Simuna church

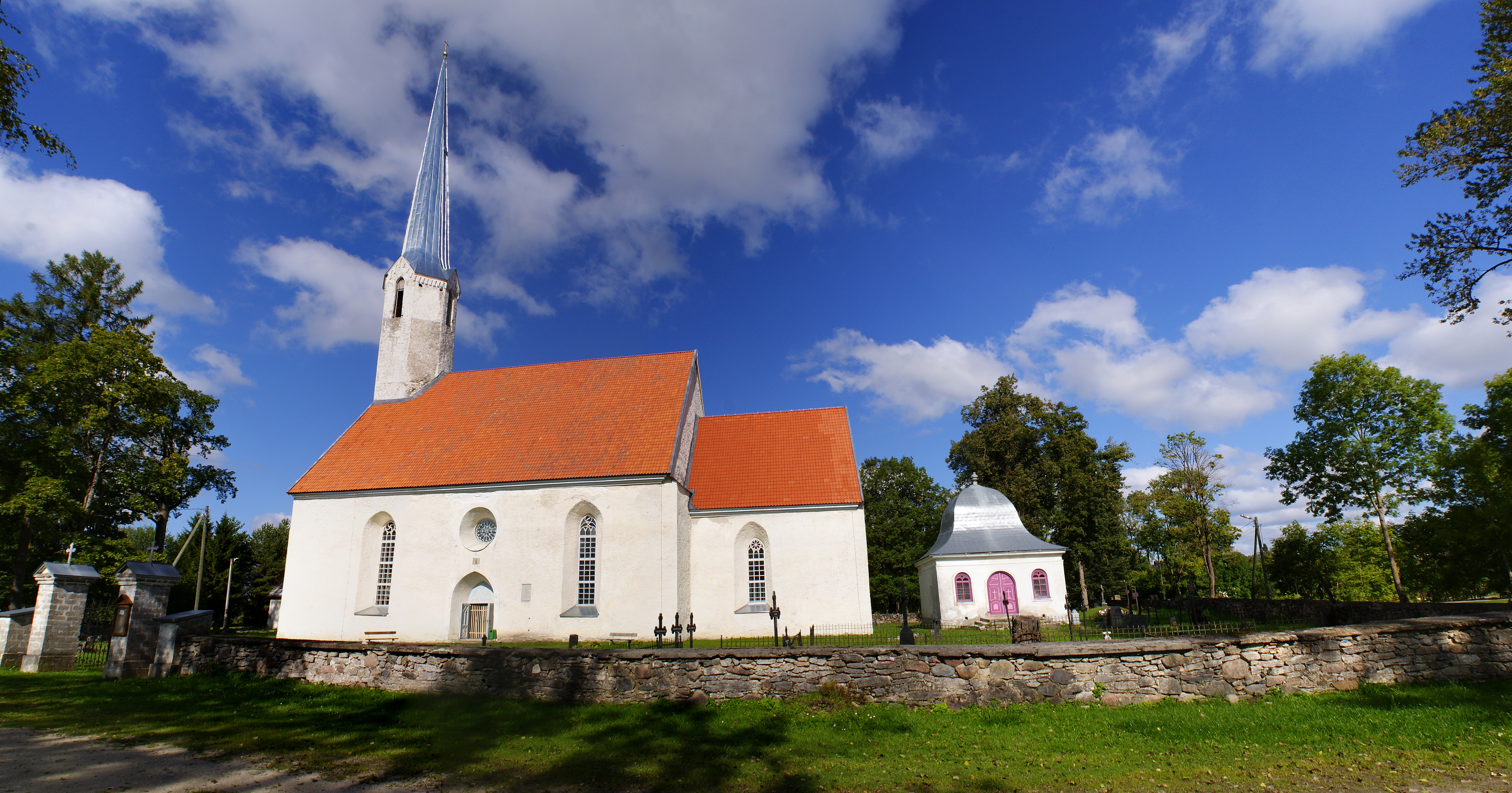
Väike-Maarja church

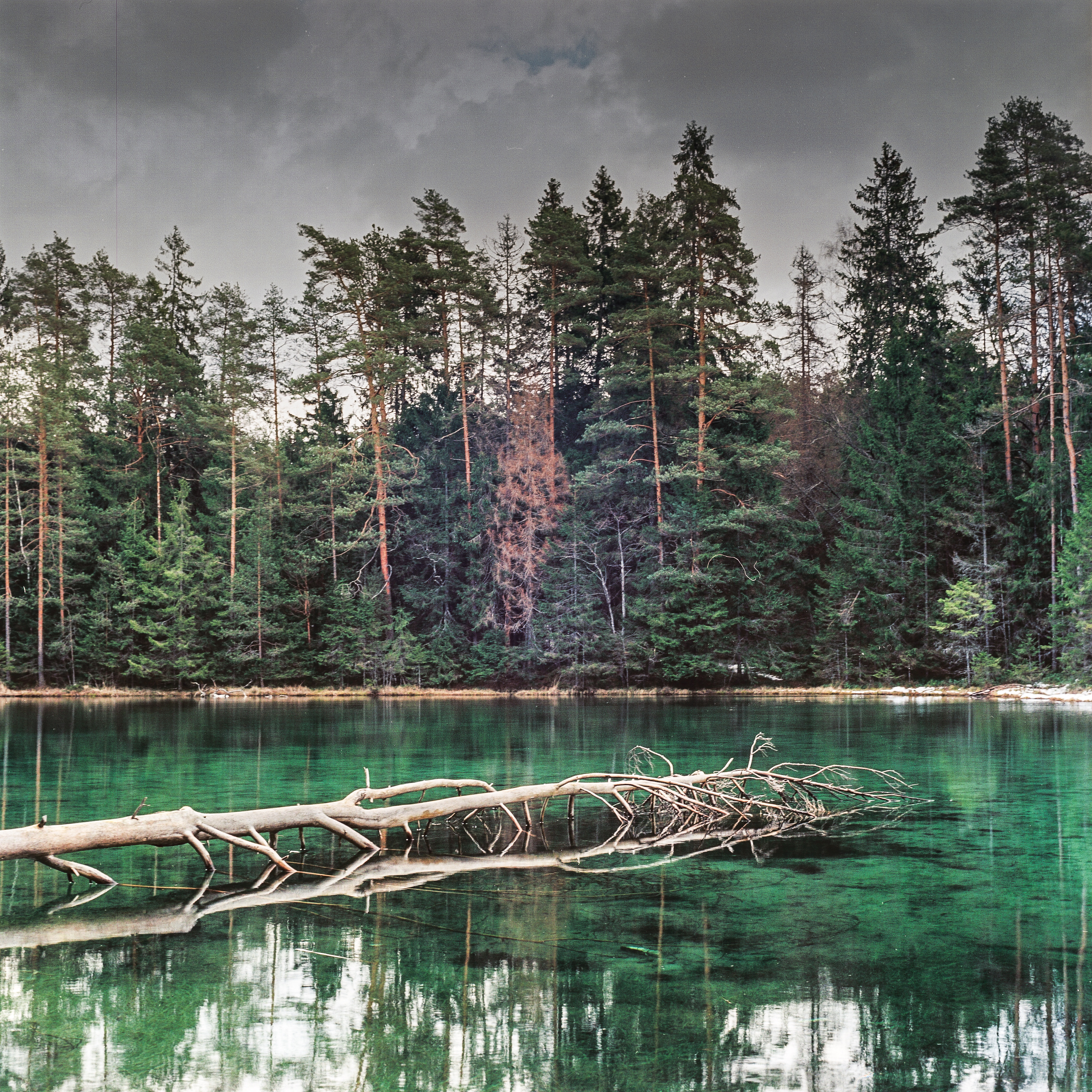
Äntu Blue Lake

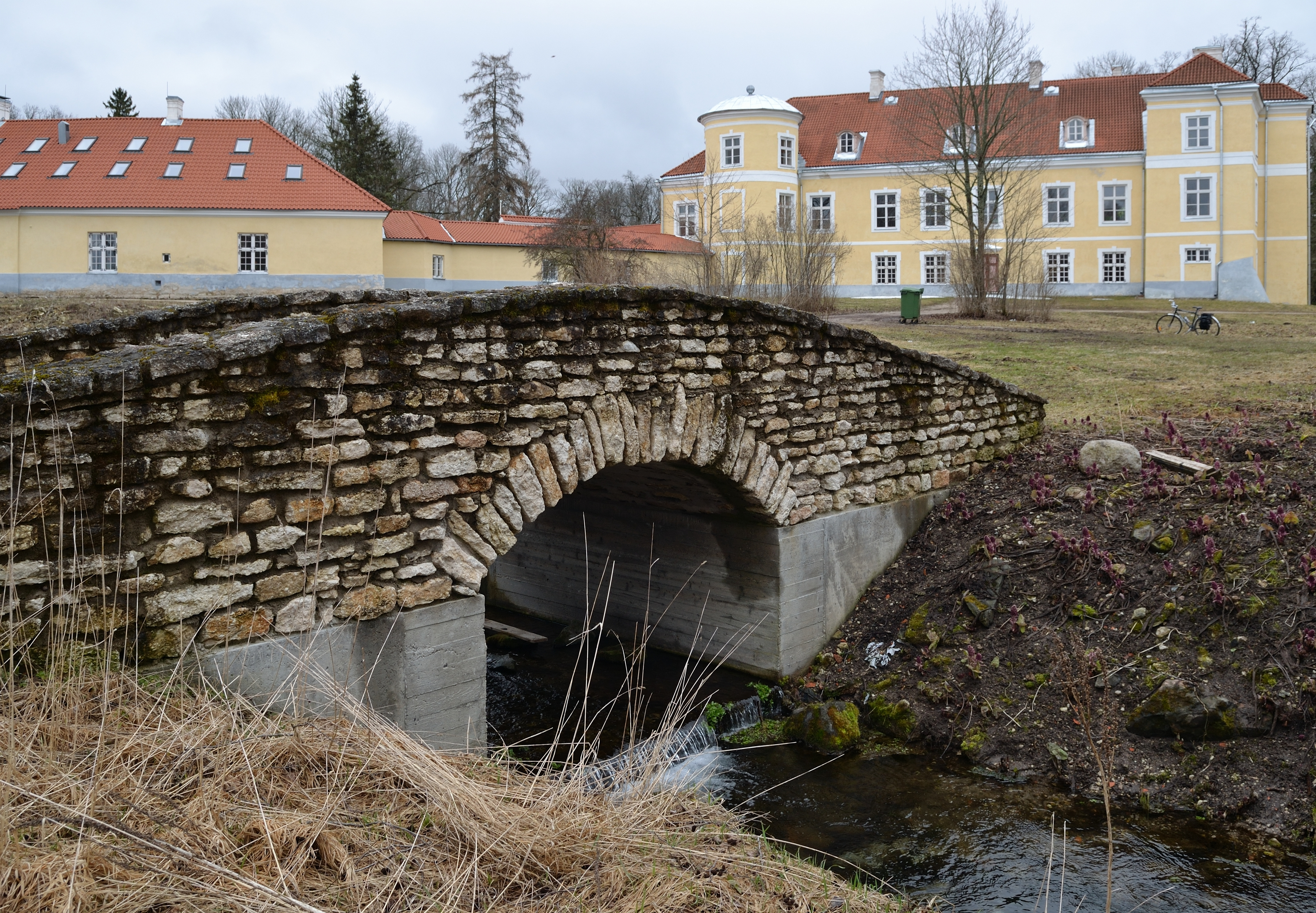
Stone bridge in Kiltsi manor park

== International relations ==
=== Twin towns — Sister cities ===
- Hausjärvi, Finland (since 1989)
- Kaarma, Estonia
- Sirdal, Norway (since 1994)
- Sonkajärvi, Finland (since 1997)
- Tommerup, Denmark (1995–2007)
