= Rakke Parish =

Former municipality of Estonia

Coordinates: 58°58′54″N 26°15′16″E

Rakke Parish Rakke vald
- Former municipality of Estonia
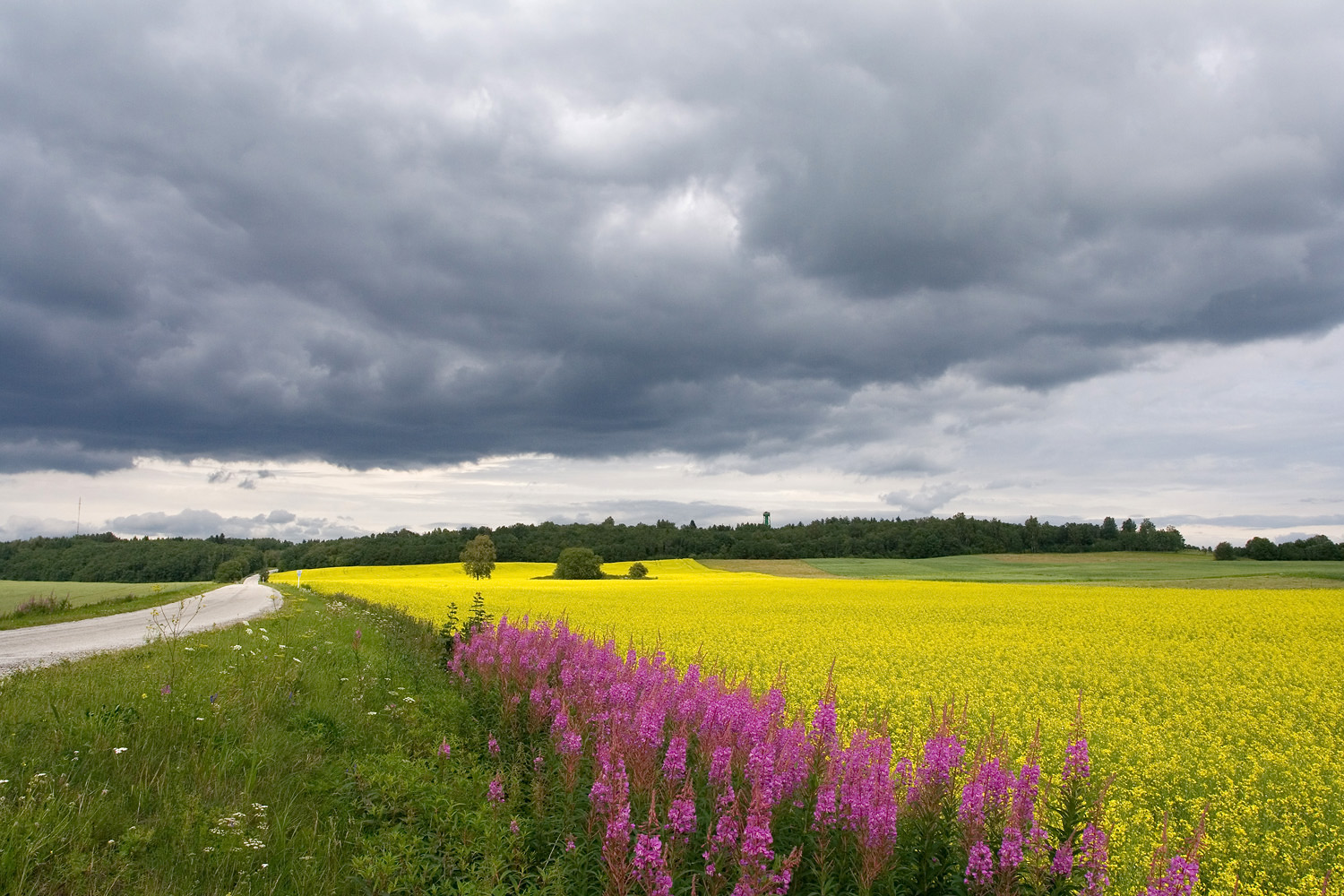
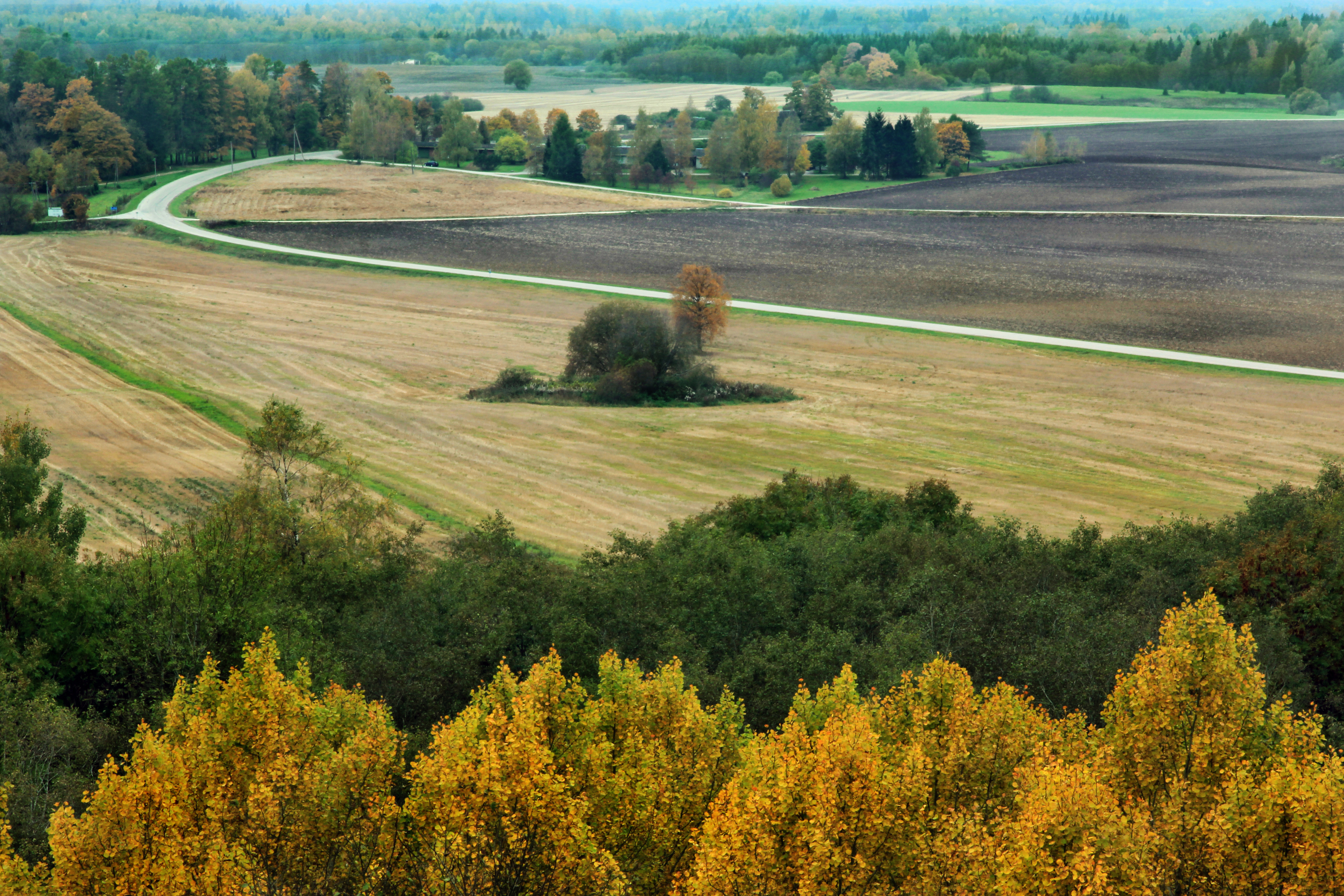

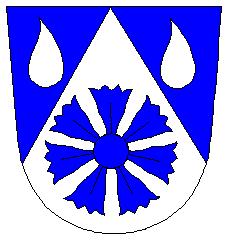
- Flag Coat of arms

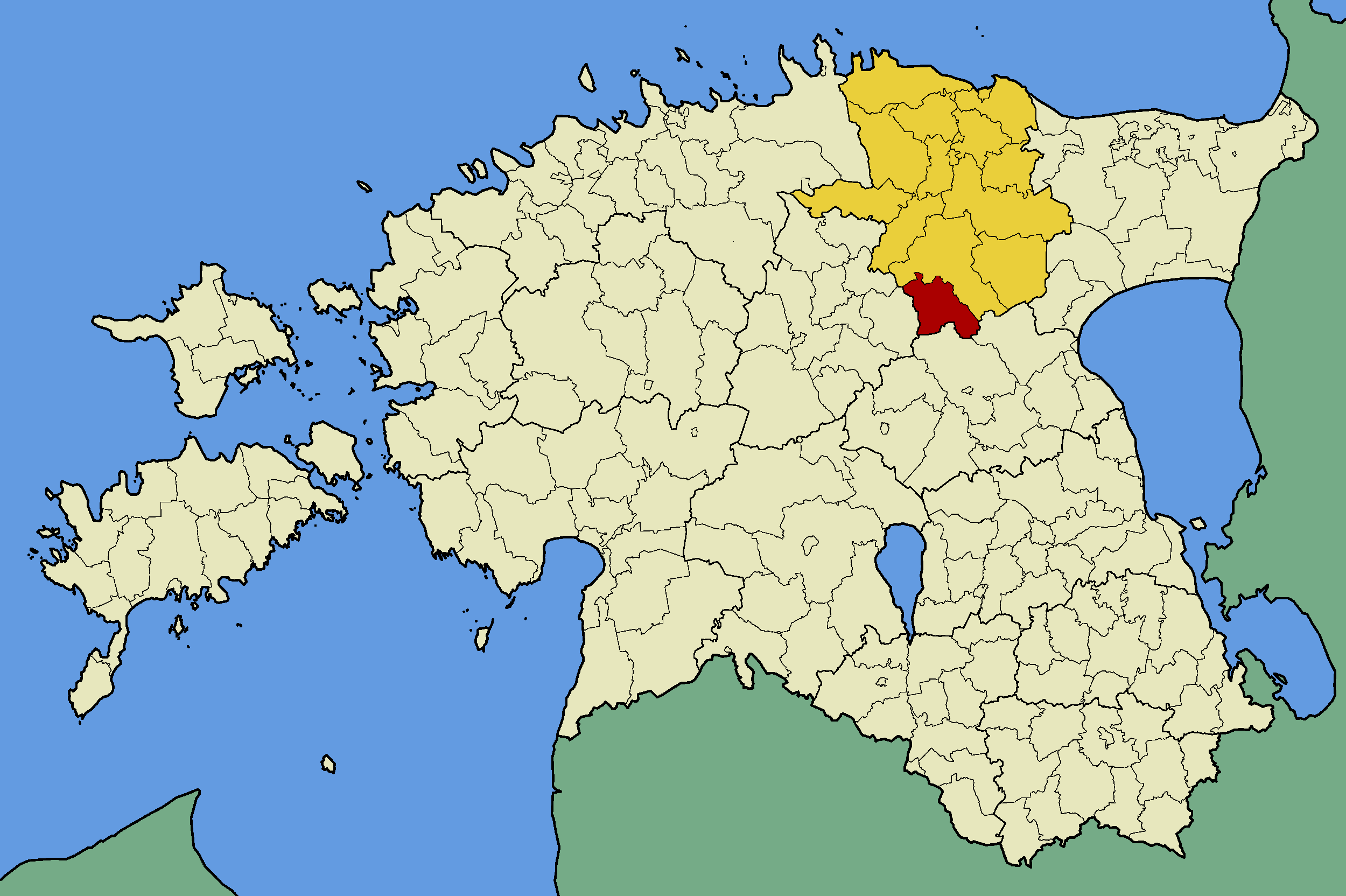
- Rakke Parish within Lääne-Viru County.
- Country: Estonia
- County: Lääne-Viru County
- Administrative centre: Rakke

Area
  - Total: 226 km^{2} (87 sq mi)

Population (2006)
  - Total: 1,924
  - Density: 8.51/km^{2} (22.0/sq mi)
- Website: www.rakke.ee

Rakke Parish (Estonian: Rakke vald) was a rural municipality of Estonia, in Lääne-Viru County. It had a population of 1924 (2006) and an area of 226 km^{2} (87 sq mi).

== Settlements ==
Rakke Parish had 1 small borough and 30 villages.

Small borough

Rakke

Villages

Ao - Edru - Emumäe - Jäätma - Kaavere - Kadiküla - Kamariku - Kellamäe - Kitsemetsa - Koila - Koluvere - Kõpsta - Lahu - Lammasküla - Lasinurme - Liigvalla - Mõisamaa - Mäiste - Nõmmküla - Olju - Padaküla - Piibe - Räitsvere - Salla - Sootaguse - Suure-Rakke - Tammiku - Villakvere - Väike-Rakke - Väike-Tammiku.

== See also ==
- Endla Nature Reserve
