= Saluri =

Saluri is an Estonian surname. Notable people with the surname include:

- Karl Robert Saluri (born 1993), Estonian decathlete
- Piret Saluri (born 1943), Estonian diplomat
- Rein Saluri (1939–2023), Estonian writer
