= Panga (disambiguation) =

Panga is the common South African name for Pterogymnus laniarius, a small, ocean-dwelling fish.

Panga or Pangas may also refer to:

== Biology ==
- Basa (fish) or Pangasius bocourti, a species of catfish
- Iridescent shark or Pangasius hypophthalmus, a species of shark catfish
- Pangasius pangasius or Pangas catfish
- Millettia stuhlmannii or panga panga, a species of timber tree

== Places ==
- Mto Panga, a settlement in Kenya
- Panga, Burkina Faso, town in Comoé Province, Burkina Faso
- Panga, Kirtipur, a settlement in Nepal
- Panga, Lääne County, village in Ridala Parish, Lääne County, Estonia
- Panga, Saare County, village in Mustjala Parish, Saare County, Estonia
- Panga Posht, a village in Gilan Province, Iran

== Boats ==
- Panga, an alternate Spanish spelling of Bangka (boat), traditional outrigger canoes from the Philippines
- Panga (skiff), a flat-bottomed fishing boat common in developing countries that was originally developed by the Yamaha Corporation in the 1970s

== Other uses ==
- Operation Panga, a 1971 military operation launched by the Rhodesian Security Forces against the communist insurgent group, ZIPRA
- Panga Cliff, a coastal cliff located near Panga in Saare County, Estonia
- PangaeaPanga or Alex Tan (born 1996), American ROM hacker and tool-assisted speedrunner
- Panga (knife), a large cutting tool in East and Southern Africa
- Panga (film), a 2020 Indian Hindi-language sports drama film
- Milvi Panga (born 1945), Estonian poet, children's writer
