= Rannamõisa Landscape Conservation Area =

Protected area in Estonia

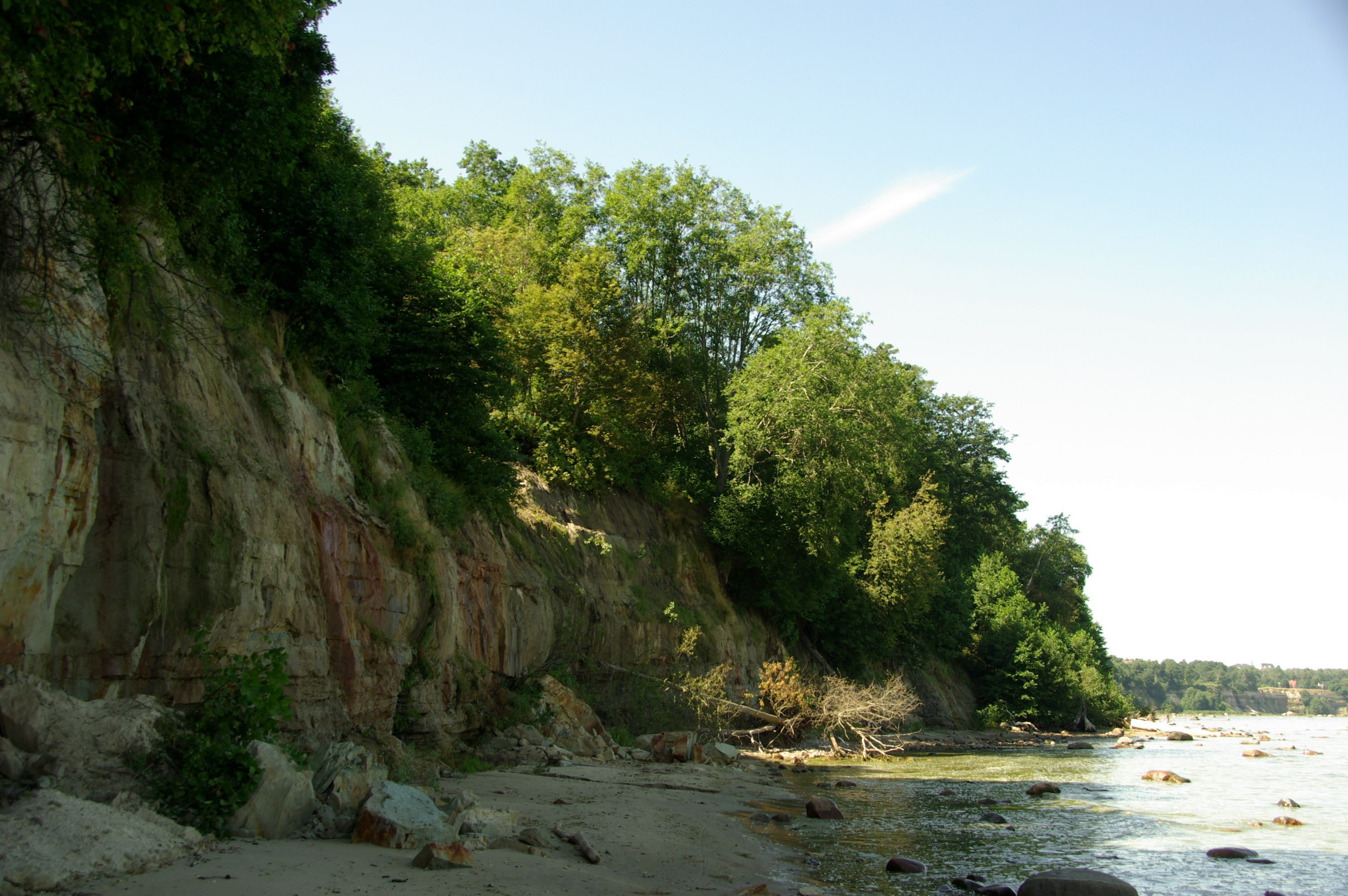

- Location within Estonia
- Location: Estonia
- Coordinates: 59°26′30″N 24°31′30″E
- Area: 67 ha (170 acres)
- Established: 1959

Rannamõisa Landscape Conservation Area is a nature park which is located in Harju County, Estonia.

The area of the nature park is 67 ha.

The protected area was founded in 1959 to protect Rannamõisa Cliff.
