= Veidemann =

Veidemann is a surname. Notable people with the surname include:

- Andra Veidemann (born 1955), Estonian historian-ethnologist
- Ralf Veidemann (1913–2009), Estonian footballer
- Rein Veidemann (born 1946), Estonian literary scholar

== See also ==
- Rain Veideman (born 1991, Estonian basketball player
