= Salme Poopuu =

Estonian filmmaker and actress

- Born: 18 October 1939; Rahtla, Estonia
- Died: 14 May 2017 (aged 77); Tallinn, Estonia
- Occupations: Actress, producer, director
- Years active: 1969–2017

Salme Poopuu (18 October 1939 – 14 May 2017) was an Estonian filmmaker and actress. Poopuu's career in the film and television industry spanned nearly fifty years working in a variety of positions, such as an actress, production assistant, production manager, producer, assistant director and director.

== Early life and education ==
Salme Poopuu was born in the village of Rahtla on the island of Saaremaa to Aleksander Theodor Poopuu and Triinu Poopuu (née Tamm). She was one of three siblings. At age nine the family moved to Kuressaare. Poopuu attended school in Kuressaare until age thirteen when the family moved to the town of Türi in Järva County where she completed her studies. After graduation, she attended the University of Tartu where she studied economic geography and demography. At university, she met students Peep Puks, Paul-Eerik Rummo and Kulle Raig, who were all interested in filmmaking. Poopuu began experimenting with an 8 mm film camera and the group would spend time filming one another.

== Career ==
After graduation from the University of Tartu, she worked as an economist for the National Design Institute's Estonian Land Development Project from 1964 until 1969.

=== Filmmaker ===
In 1969, Poopuu began work on the Madis Ojamaa directed music documentary Uksed as a production assistant. This would lead to a lengthy career in the film and television industry as a filmmaker, working on various productions as an actress, production assistant, production coordinator, production manager, producer, assistant director and director. From the early 1970s until 1996, she worked for Tallinnfilm in a number of positions. Afterward, she worked for Danish, Finnish, German and U.S. film production companies until 1998. From 1996 onward, she contributed to Estofilm, Exitfilm, RCE, Baltic Broadcast and Faama Film as a contracted project manager and an active film producer. During her lifetime, Poopuu worked as a filmmaker on over sixty television films and series and feature films.

=== Actress ===
In addition to her career as a filmmaker, Poopuu has also worked as a film and television actress since the late 1960s. One of her first significant, albeit small, roles was in the 1972 Sulev Nõmmik comedy television film Noor pensionär (English: "A Young Retiree") for Eesti Telefilm. Poopuu would spend the next several decades appearing in often small roles in motion pictures, telefilms, and television series. She is possibly best remembered by younger audiences for her appearances in such television series as Kättemaksukontor, Köök and, particularly, in the role of Salme in the Ergo Kuld directed Kanal 2 teen comedy-drama series Ühikarotid from 2010 until 2012. In 2016, she appeared in a cameo role in the music video "Mind ei koti" by the Estonian rapper Azma.

== Personal life ==
Salme Poopuu never married or had children. Beginning in her early 40s, she was in a relationship with a man that ended after fourteen years. She lived in Tallinn with a summer home in her childhood village of Rahtla on the island of Saaremaa. Poopuu was a longtime member of the Estonian Greens political party. She died in Tallinn at age 77.
