= Panga Landscape Conservation Area =

Protected area in Estonia

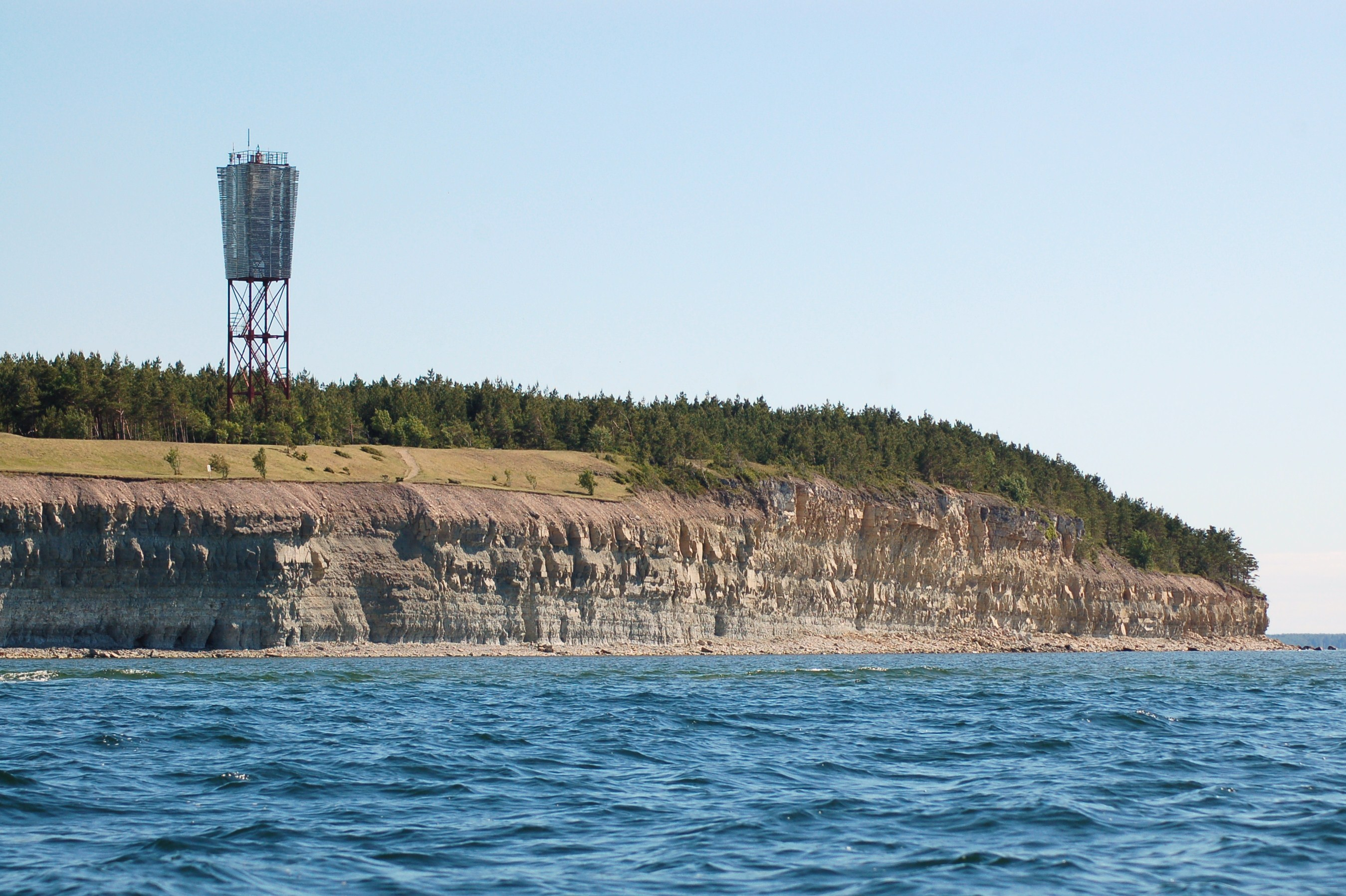

- Location within Estonia
- Location: Estonia
- Coordinates: 58°34′10″N 22°17′30″E
- Area: 27 ha (67 acres)
- Established: 1959

Panga Landscape Conservation Area is a nature park which is located in Saare County, Estonia.

The area of the nature park is 27 ha. The protected area was founded in 1959 to protect Panga Cliff and its plant communities.
