= Aseri Landscape Conservation Area =

Protected area in Estonia

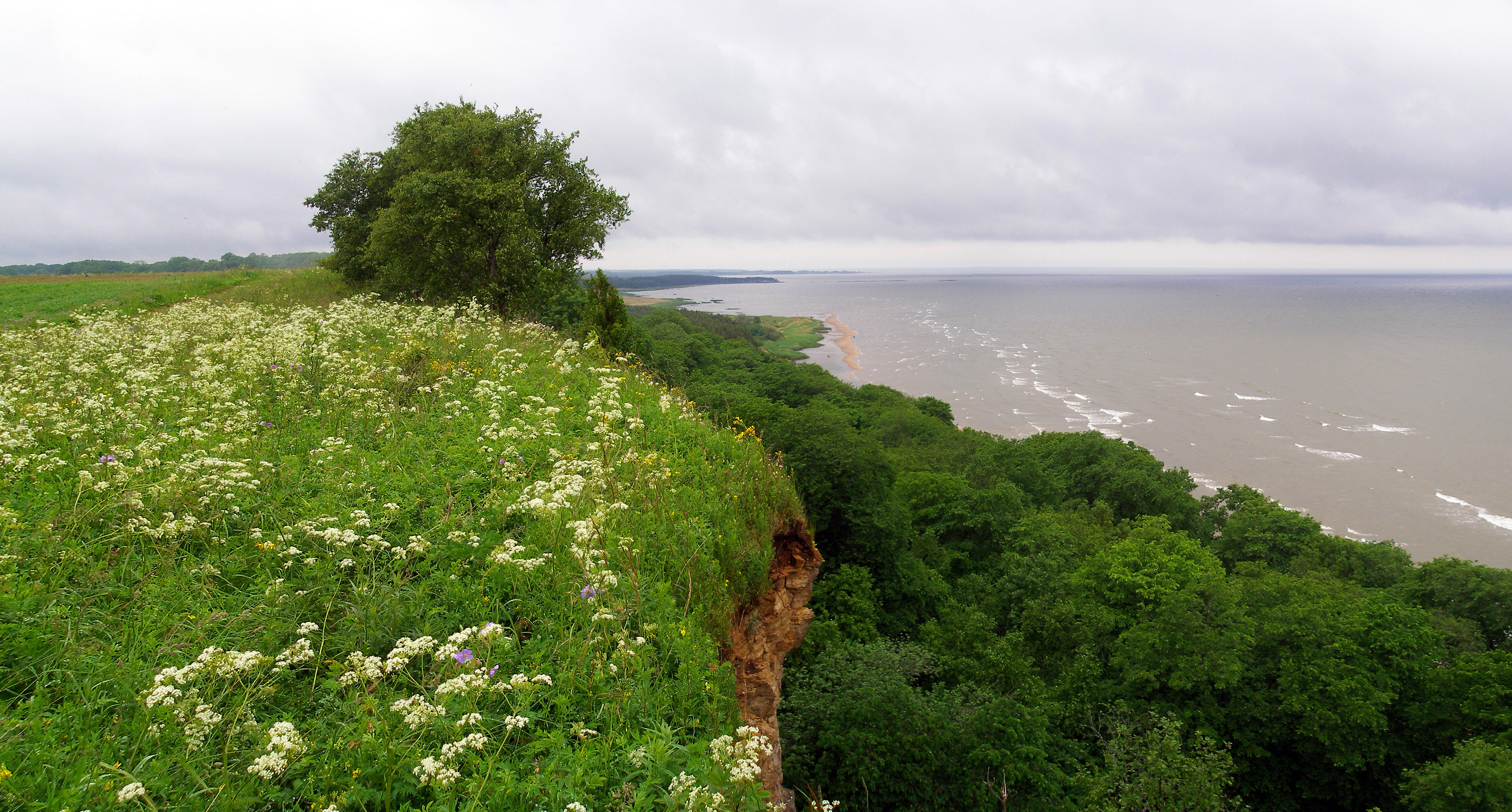
- Aseri cliff

- Location within Estonia
- Location: Estonia
- Coordinates: 59°26′50″N 26°51′48″E
- Area: 611 ha (1,510 acres)
- Established: 2007

Aseri Landscape Conservation Area is a nature park situated in Lääne-Viru County, Estonia.

Its area is 611 ha.

The protected area was designated in 2007 to protect nature of and near Aseri Cliff.
