= Ohessaare Landscape Conservation Area =

Protected area in Estonia

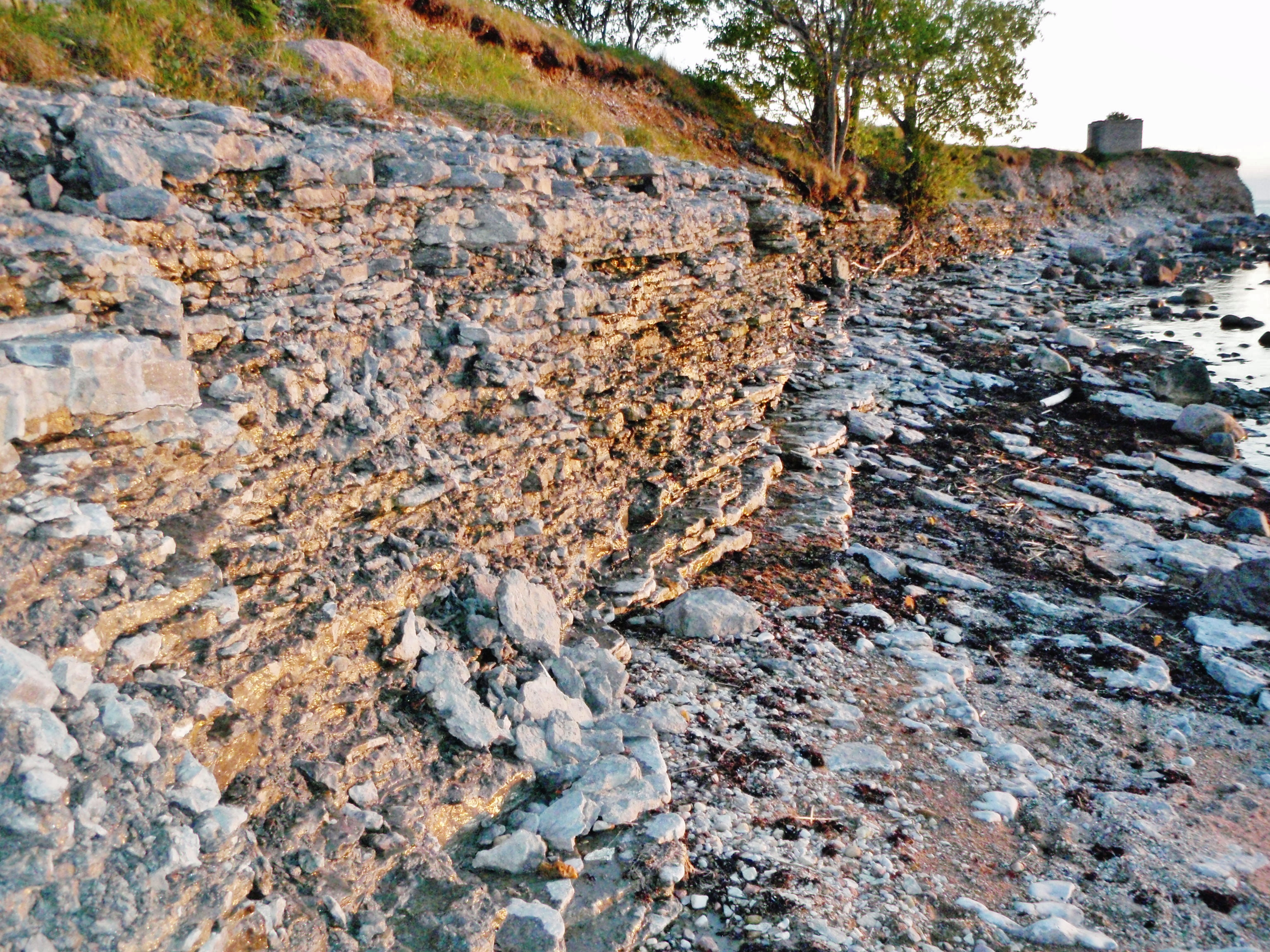

- Location within Estonia
- Location: Estonia
- Coordinates: 58°00′00″N 22°01′08″E
- Area: 6 ha (15 acres)
- Established: 1959 (2006)

Ohessaare Landscape Conservation Area is a nature park which is located in Saare County, Estonia.

The area of the nature park is 6 ha.

The protected area was founded in 1959 to protect Ohessaare Cliff and adjacent gravel beach (Estonian: kliburand). In 2006, the protected area was designated to the landscape conservation area.
