= Rahtla =

Village in Estonia

Coordinates: 58°27′N 22°11′E

- Village
- Interactive map of Rahtla
- Country: Estonia
- County: Saare County
- Parish: Saaremaa Parish
- Time zone: UTC+2 (EET)
  - Summer (DST): UTC+3 (EEST)

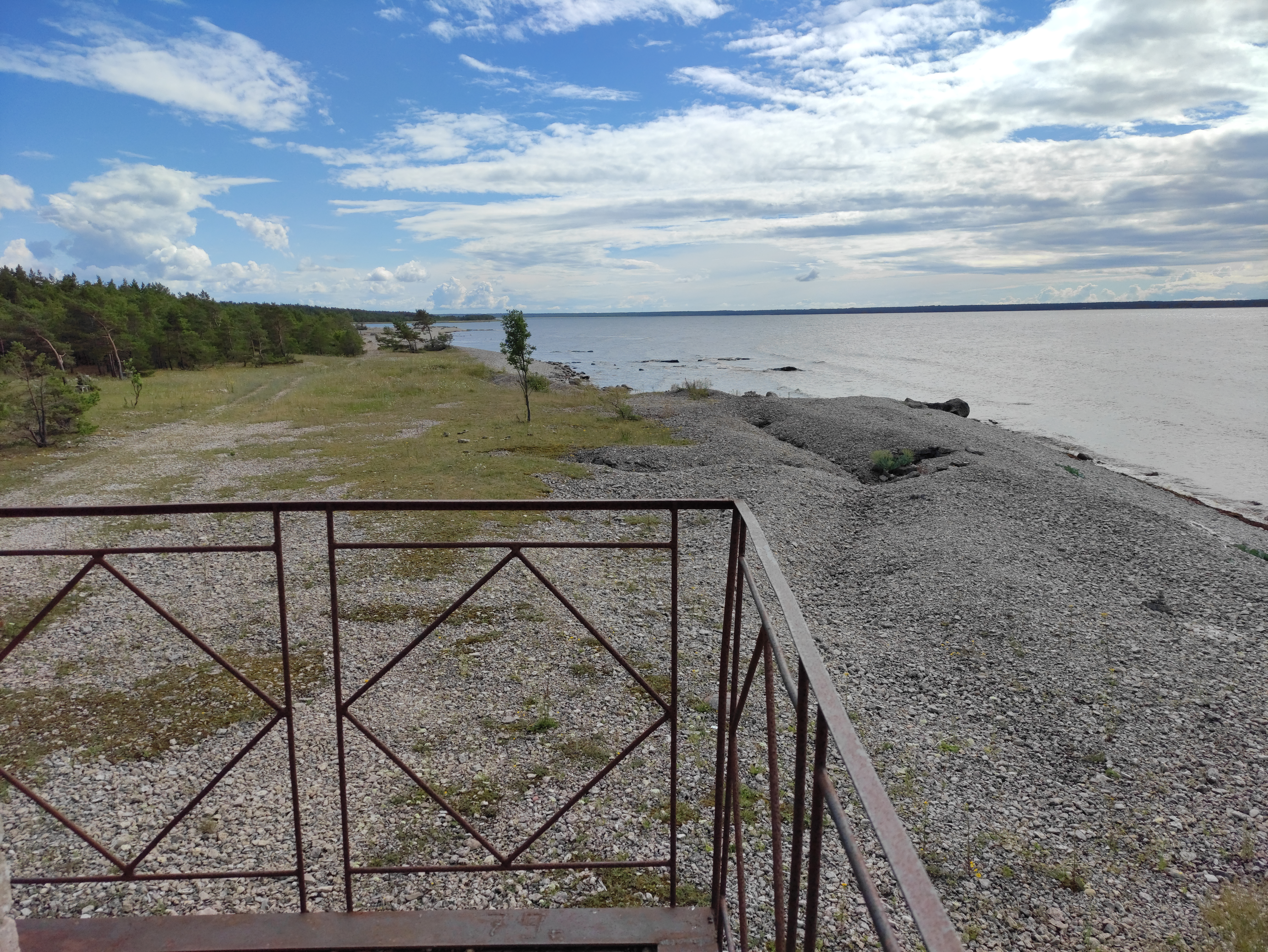

Rahtla is a village in Saaremaa Parish, Saare County in western Estonia.

Before the administrative reform in 2017, the village was in Mustjala Parish.

Rahtla is the birthplace of Estonian filmmaker and actress Salme Poopuu.
