= Mustjala Parish =

Former municipality of Estonia

Coordinates: 58°28′00″N 22°15′00″E

Mustjala Parish Mustjala vald
- Former municipality of Estonia
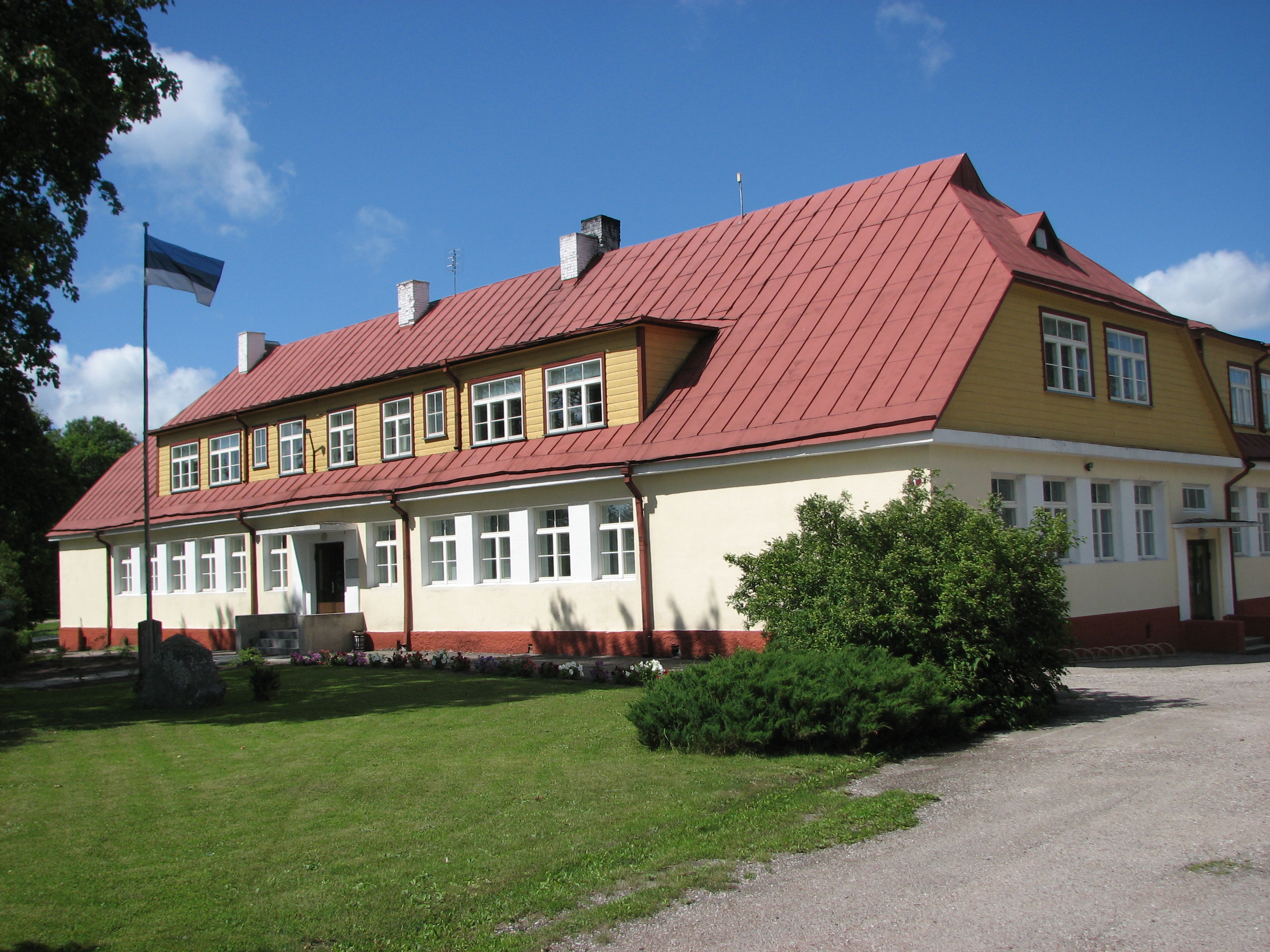
- Mustjala primary school

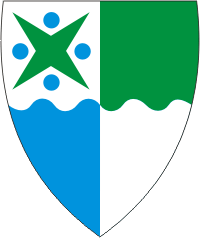
- Flag Coat of arms

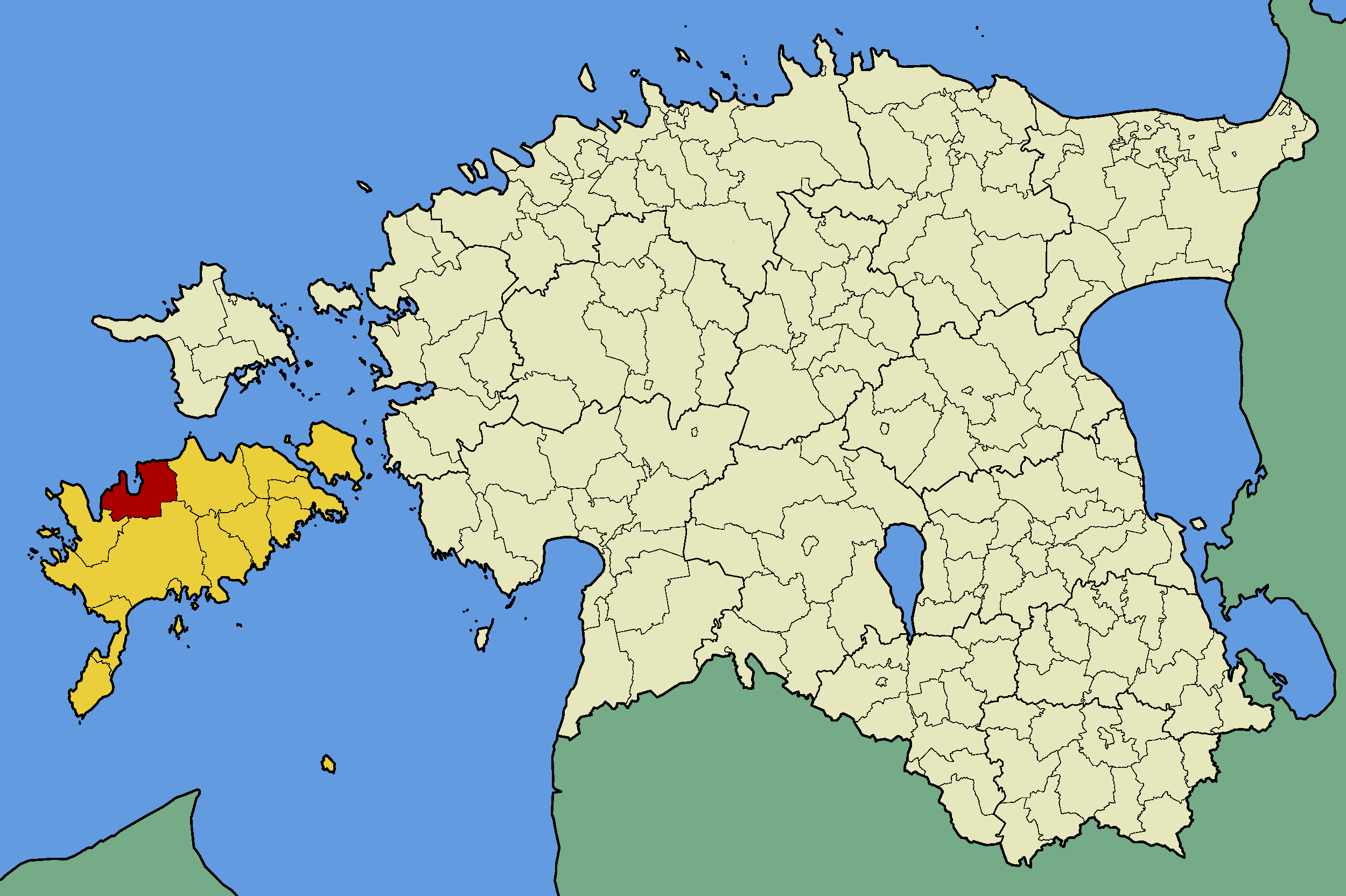
- Mustjala Parish within Saare County.
- Country: Estonia
- County: Saare County
- Administrative centre: Mustjala

Area
  - Total: 235.97 km^{2} (91.11 sq mi)

Population (01.01.2009)
  - Total: 755
  - Density: 3.20/km^{2} (8.29/sq mi)
- Website: mustjala.ee

Mustjala Parish was a municipality in Saare County, Estonia. The municipality had a population of 755 (as of 1 January 2009) and covered an area of 235.97 km².

During the administrative-territorial reform in 2017, all 12 municipalities on the island Saaremaa were merged into a single municipality – Saaremaa Parish.

== Villages ==
Jauni - Järise - Kiruma - Kugalepa - Küdema - Liiküla - Liiva - Merise - Mustjala - Ninase - Ohtja - Paatsa - Pahapilli - Panga - Rahtla - Selgase - Silla - Tagaranna - Tuiu - Vanakubja - Võhma

== See also ==
- Municipalities of Estonia
