= Mõisamaa, Lääne-Viru County =

Village in Estonia

Coordinates: 58°58′05″N 26°19′49″E

Mõisamaa
- Village
- Interactive map of Mõisamaa
- Country: Estonia
- County: Lääne-Viru County
- Parish: Rakke Parish
- Time zone: UTC+2 (EET)
  - Summer (DST): UTC+3 (EEST)

Mõisamaa (German: Moisama) is a village in Väike-Maarja Parish, Lääne-Viru County, in northeastern Estonia. Prior to the administrative reforms of Estonian municipalities in 2017, it was located in Rakke Parish.
