= Theodor Rõuk =

Estonian politician

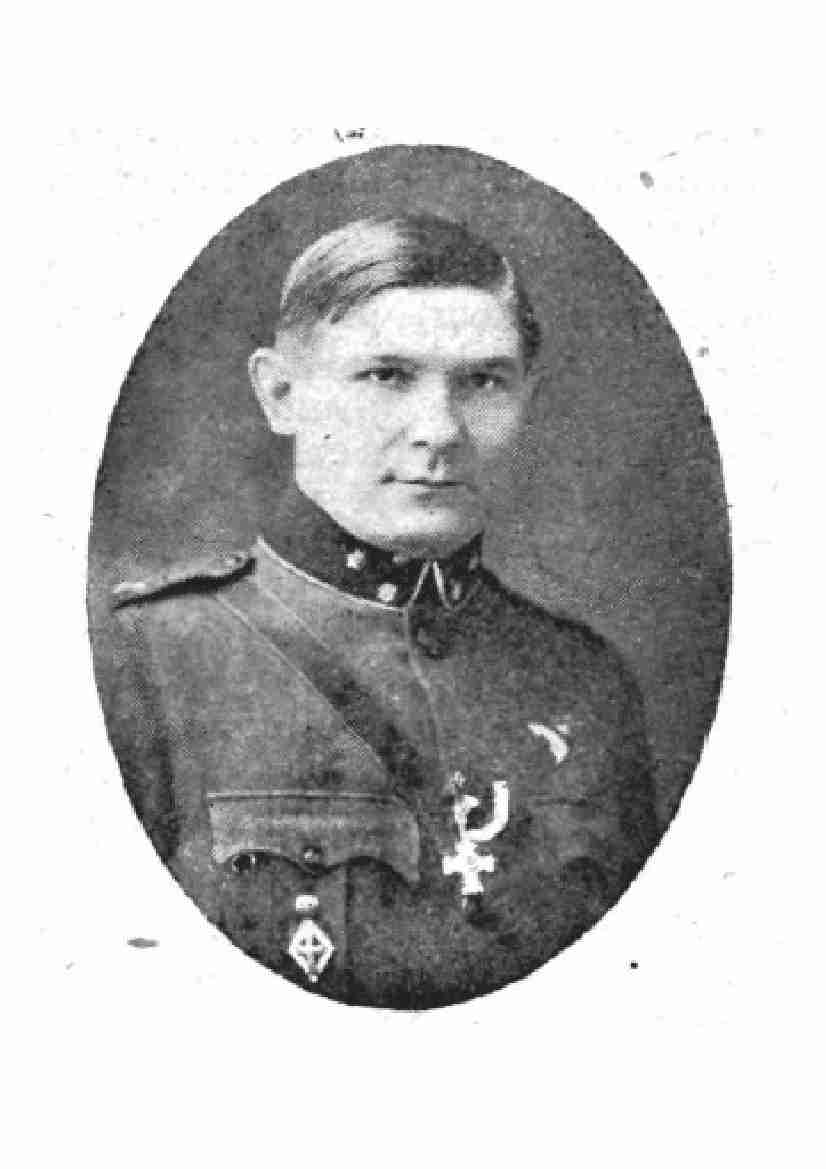
Theodor Rõuk

Theodor Rõuk (14 December 1891 – 21 July 1940) was an Estonian lawyer, politician and soldier.

Rõuk was born in Kabala Parish (now, part of Türi Parish). In 1924 he was Minister of Internal Affairs. Following the Soviet occupation of Estonia in 1940, Rõuk committed suicide in Tallinn, aged 48.

His granddaughter is diplomat and translator Piret Saluri.
