= Järise, Saare County =

Village in Estonia

Coordinates: 58°30′21″N 22°26′26″E

Järise
- Village
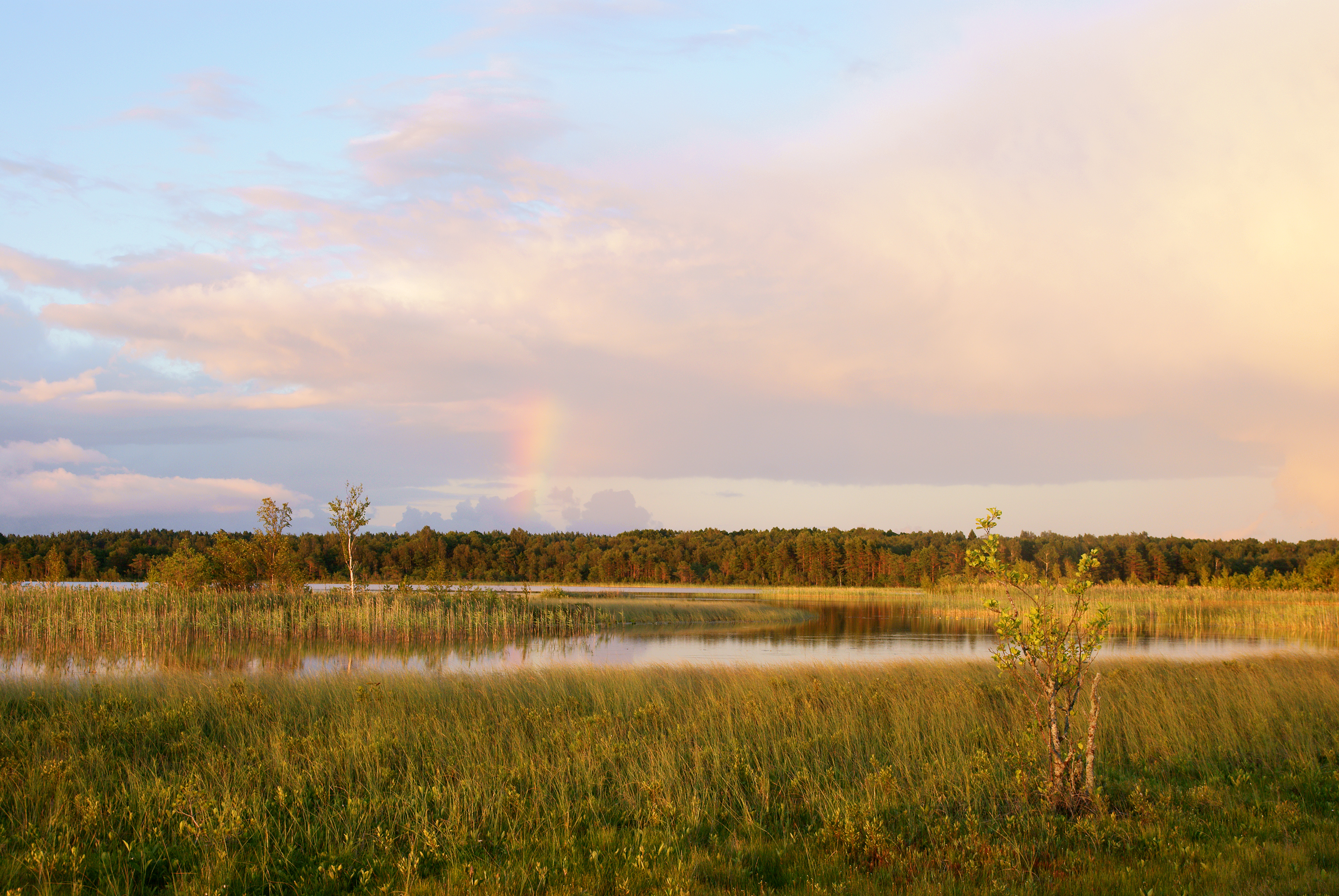
- Järise lake in Järise village
- Interactive map of Järise
- Country: Estonia
- County: Saare County
- Parish: Saaremaa Parish
- Time zone: UTC+2 (EET)
  - Summer (DST): UTC+3 (EEST)

Järise is a village in Saaremaa Parish, Saare County in western Estonia.

Before the administrative reform in 2017, the village was in Mustjala Parish.
