= Lasinurme =

Village in Estonia

Coordinates: 58°56′N 26°20′E

- Village
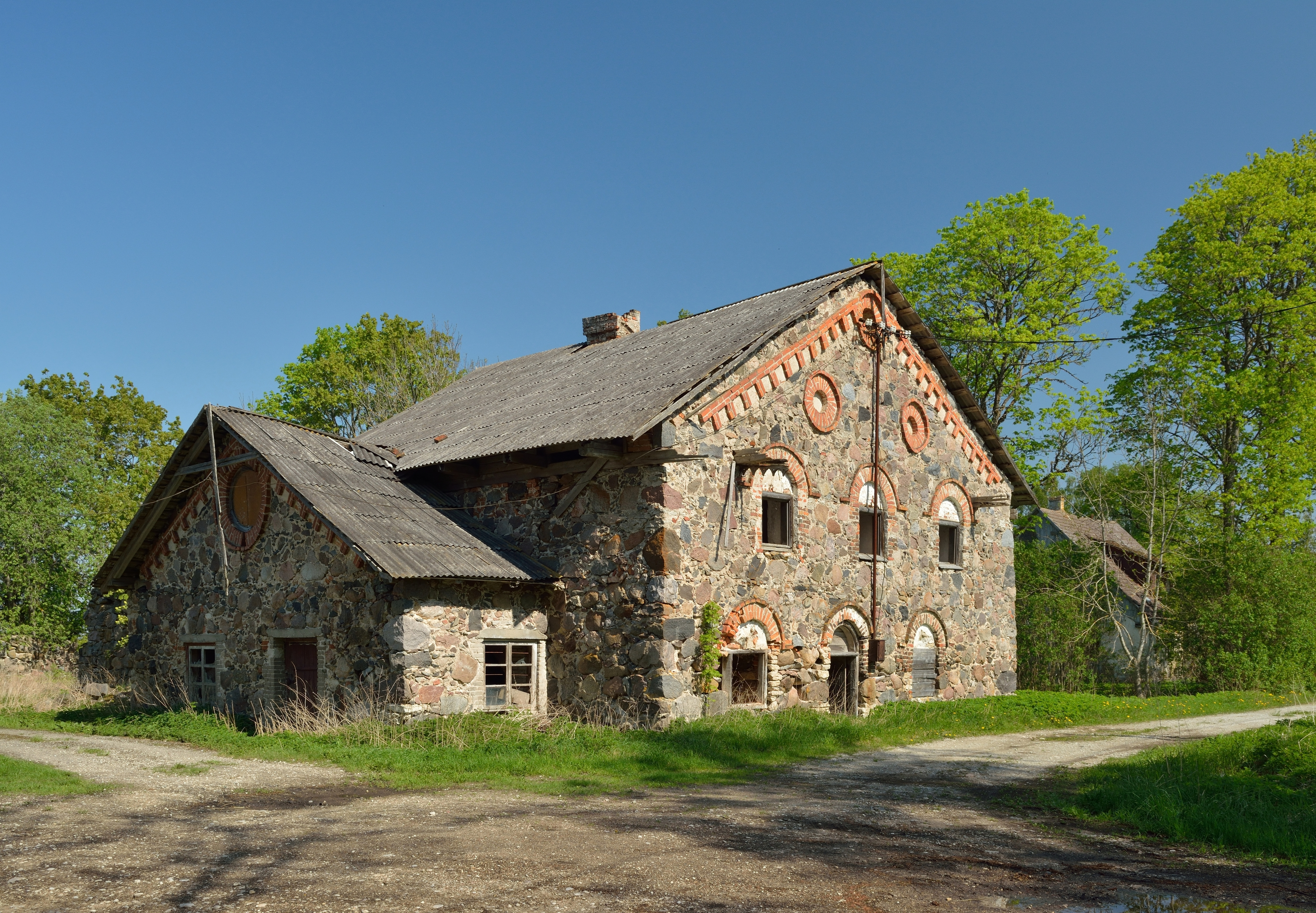
- Lasinurme manor vodka distillery
- Interactive map of Lasinurme
- Country: Estonia
- County: Lääne-Viru County
- Parish: Väike-Maarja Parish
- Time zone: UTC+2 (EET)
  - Summer (DST): UTC+3 (EEST)

Lasinurme (German: Lassinorm) is a village in Väike-Maarja Parish, Lääne-Viru County, in northeastern Estonia. Prior to the administrative reforms of Estonian municipalities in 2017, it was located in Rakke Parish.
