= Liiküla =

Village in Estonia

Coordinates: 58°34′N 22°26′E

- Village
- Interactive map of Liiküla
- Country: Estonia
- County: Saare County
- Parish: Saaremaa Parish
- Time zone: UTC+2 (EET)
  - Summer (DST): UTC+3 (EEST)

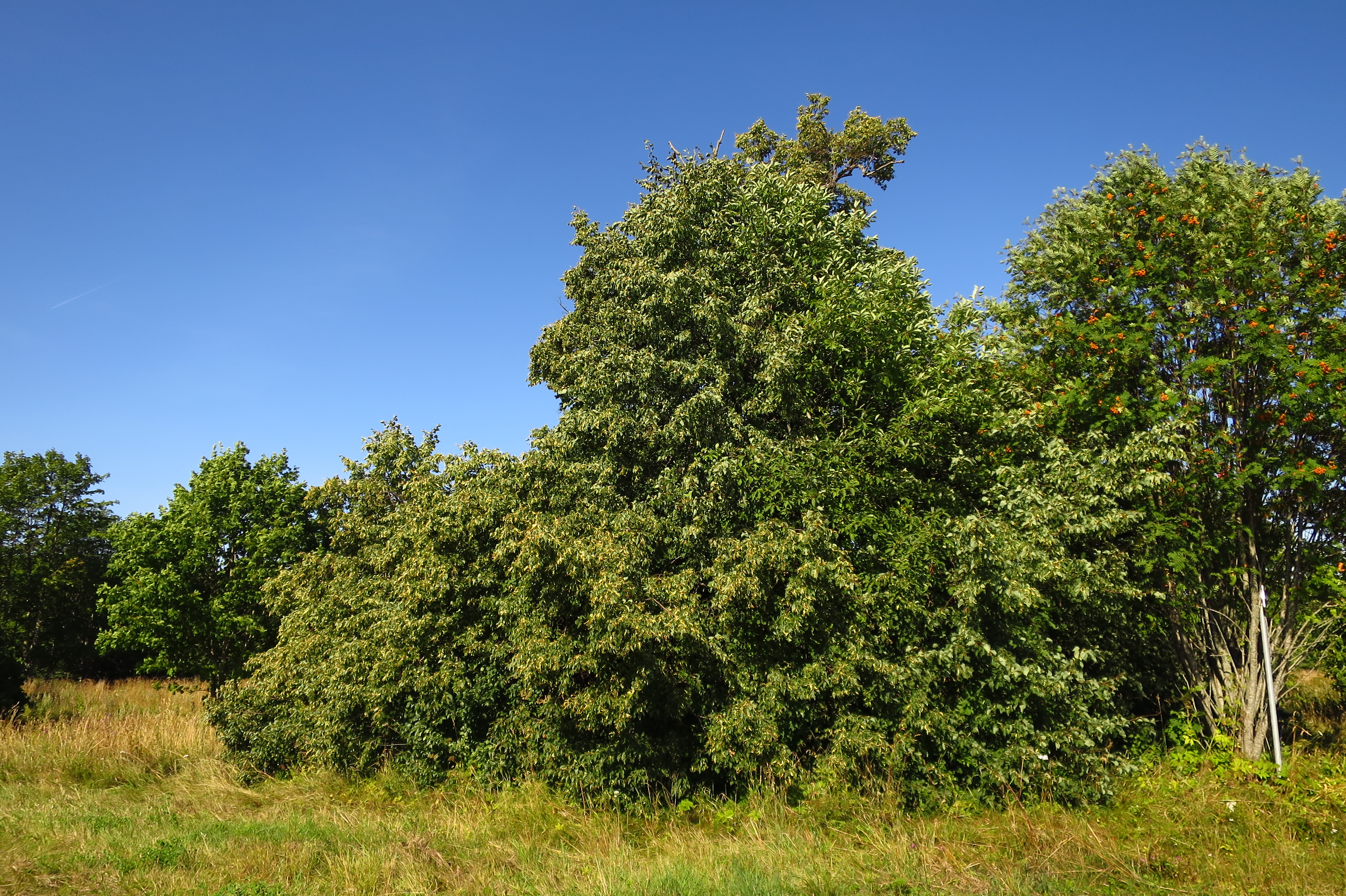

Liiküla is a village in Saaremaa Parish, Saare County in western Estonia. As per 2011 census the village had nine people.

Before the administrative reform in 2017, the village was in Mustjala Parish.
