= Emumäe =

Village in Estonia

Coordinates: 58°55′N 26°21′E

- Village
- Interactive map of Emumäe
- Country: Estonia
- County: Lääne-Viru County
- Parish: Väike-Maarja Parish
- Time zone: UTC+2 (EET)
  - Summer (DST): UTC+3 (EEST)

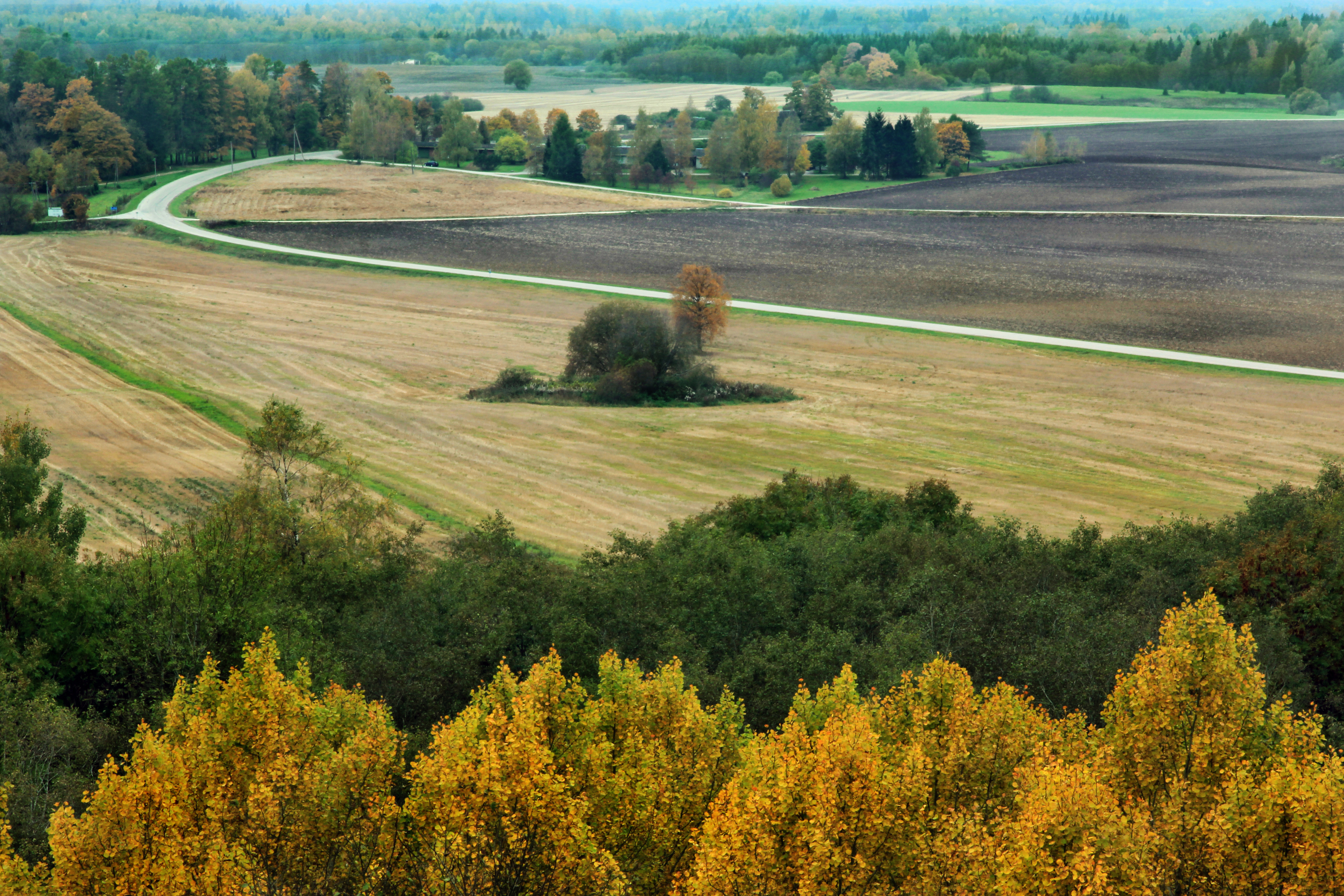
View tower on the hill of Emumägi

Emumäe (German: Emmomäggi) is a village in Väike-Maarja Parish, Lääne-Viru County, in northeastern Estonia. Prior to the administrative reforms of Estonian municipalities in 2017, it was located in Rakke Parish.
