= Aino Kallas Award =

Annual prize by the Finnish Estonian Foundation

The Aino Kallas Award (Estonian: Aino Kallase preemia, also the Aino Kallas Translation Award, Estonian: Aino Kallase tõlkepreemia) is an award that recognizes Estonian individuals or collectives that have made significant contributions to the development of Estonian–Finnish cultural relations.

The award is named after the Finnish–Estonian author Aino Kallas (1878–1956), and it was established in 2004. The award is conferred by the Finnish Estonian Foundation (Finnish: Viro-säätiö).

== Recipients ==
- 2005: Kulle Raig, journalist
- 2006: Sirje Olesk, literary scholar
- 2009: Rein Veidemann, literary scholar
- Maimu Berg, writer, critic, translator, and journalist
- 2013: Rain Kooli, journalist
- Tallinn Lilleküla High School
- 2014: Margit Kuusk, language teacher
- 2015: Piret Saluri, translator
- 2016: Järvi Lipasti, philologist
- 2017: Ekke Väli, sculptor
- 2018: Iivi Anna Masso, social scientist
- 2019: Ene Salumäe, organist
- 2020: Kadri Jaanits, translator
- 2021: Tallinn Coeducational High School
- 2022: Ivar Heinmaa, cinematographer and director
- 2023: Viia Väli, language teacher and translator
