= Merise, Estonia =

Village in Estonia

Coordinates: 58°29′31″N 22°09′54″E

Merise
- Village
- Interactive map of Merise
- Country: Estonia
- County: Saare County
- Parish: Saaremaa Parish
- Time zone: UTC+2 (EET)
  - Summer (DST): UTC+3 (EEST)

Merise is a village in Saaremaa Parish, Saare County in western Estonia.

== History ==
The Oesel meteorite was found in Merise in 1855. Before the administrative reform in 2017, the village was in Mustjala Parish.
