= Paul Saagpakk =

Estonian linguist

- Born: September 2, 1910; Mustjala, Estonia
- Died: February 23, 1996 (aged 85); Kuressaare, Estonia
- Resting place: Mustjala, Estonia
- Occupation: Linguist

Paul Friedrich Saagpakk (September 2, 1910, in Mustjala, Saaremaa, Governorate of Livonia – February 23, 1996, in Kuressaare, Saaremaa, Estonia) was an Estonian linguist who compiled a standard reference dictionary of Estonian with 500,000 Estonian expressions and their English equivalents.

== Career ==
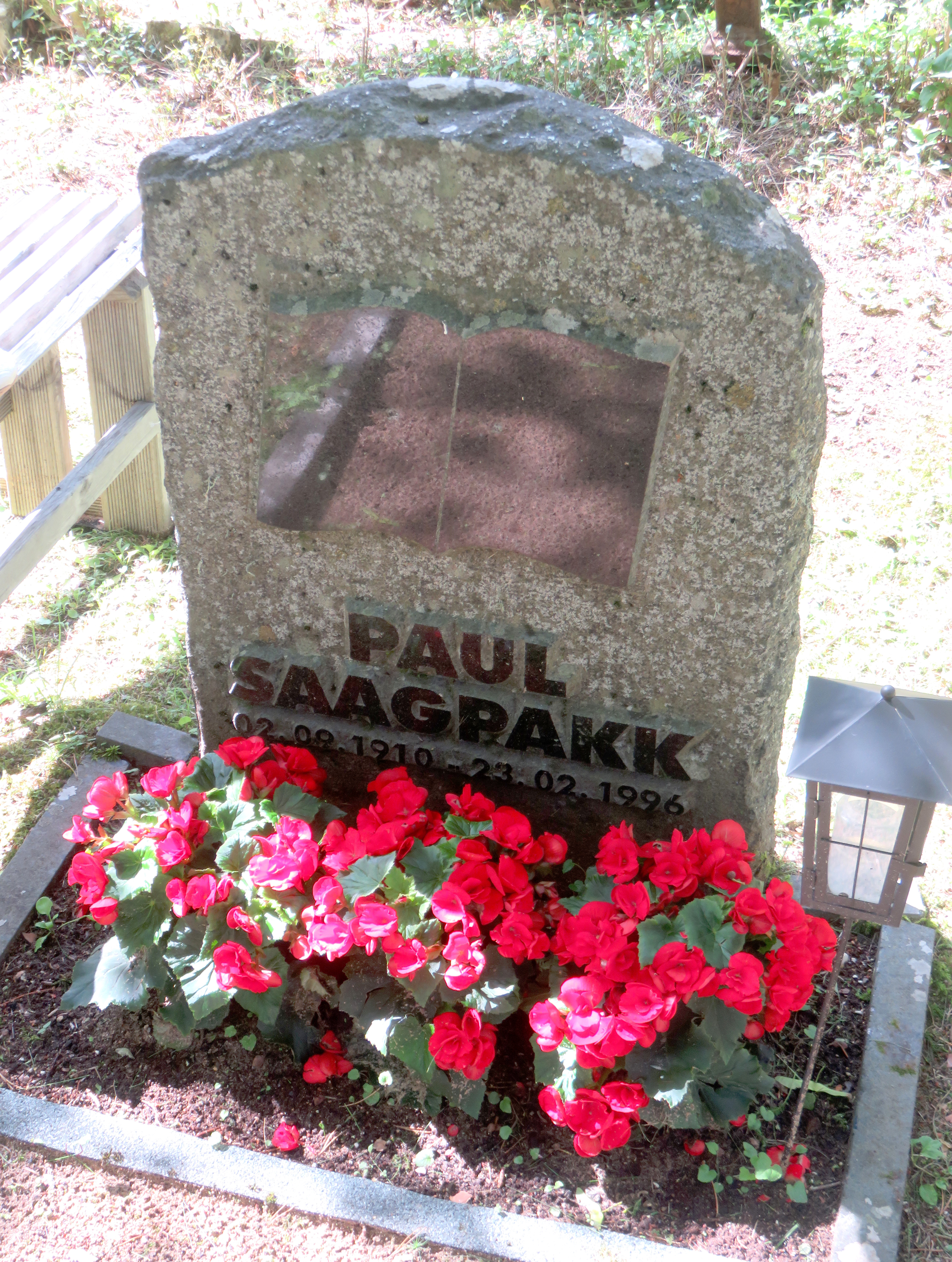
Saagpakk's grave in Mustjala

Saagpakk graduated from the University of Tartu in 1935. From 1935, he worked as an English teacher in Tallinn. He studied at Southampton University College in 1936. In 1943, he fled the German occupation of Estonia to Finland, and then in 1944 to Sweden, where he earned another degree. In 1946, he moved to the US, and he obtained US citizenship in 1949. He then taught English and psychology at Upsala College in East Orange, New Jersey. He received a doctorate from Columbia University in 1966. After teaching at Rutgers University and Newark State Teachers College, he taught English at the University of Massachusetts Amherst until his retirement in 1981.

After the end of the Soviet occupation in Estonia in 1991, Saagpakk returned to his homeland in 1995. In 1996, he was awarded the Order of the National Coat of Arms for his achievements. He died at his home in Kuressaare in 1996 and is buried in the cemetery in Mustjala.

== Works ==
- Eesti-inglise sõnaraamat (1982, Yale University Press)

== Family ==
Paul Saagpakk was married to Kira Saagpakk (née Kimberg, 1917–2014). He later married Olga Emilia Saagpakk (1913–?), whom he divorced in 1961.
