= Silla, Saare County =

Village in Estonia

Coordinates: 58°27′02″N 22°14′47″E

Silla
- Village
- Interactive map of Silla
- Country: Estonia
- County: Saare County
- Parish: Saaremaa Parish
- Time zone: UTC+2 (EET)
  - Summer (DST): UTC+3 (EEST)

Silla is a village in Saaremaa Parish, Saare County in western Estonia.

== Name ==
The name Silla probably comes from the word sild (genitive: silla) 'bridge', which can also mean 'road' in common speech. The village lies at the intersection of roads.

== History ==
Before the administrative reform in 2017, the village was in Mustjala Parish.
