= Pahapilli =

Village in Estonia

Coordinates: 58°34′N 22°25′E

- Village
- Interactive map of Pahapilli
- Country: Estonia
- County: Saare County
- Parish: Saaremaa Parish
- Time zone: UTC+2 (EET)
  - Summer (DST): UTC+3 (EEST)

Pahapilli is a village in Saaremaa Parish, Saare County in western Estonia.

== Name ==
Pahapilli was attested in historical sources as Pilli Pent in 1592 (?) and Paha Pilli Tönnis in 1627 (both referring to individuals), Pahhapil in 1798 (referring to a cluster of farms), Pahapilli in 1826, and Пахапилли in 1900. There is also a farm named Pahapilli in the village. The village name probably originated from the farm name, which is a compound of the adjective paha 'bad, evil' and the personal name Pill 'Philip', genitive Pilli, thus meaning 'bad Philip' and referring to some individual.

== History ==
Before the administrative reform in 2017, the village was in Mustjala Parish.
