= Kamariku =

Village in Estonia

Coordinates: 59°01′03″N 26°15′23″E

- Village
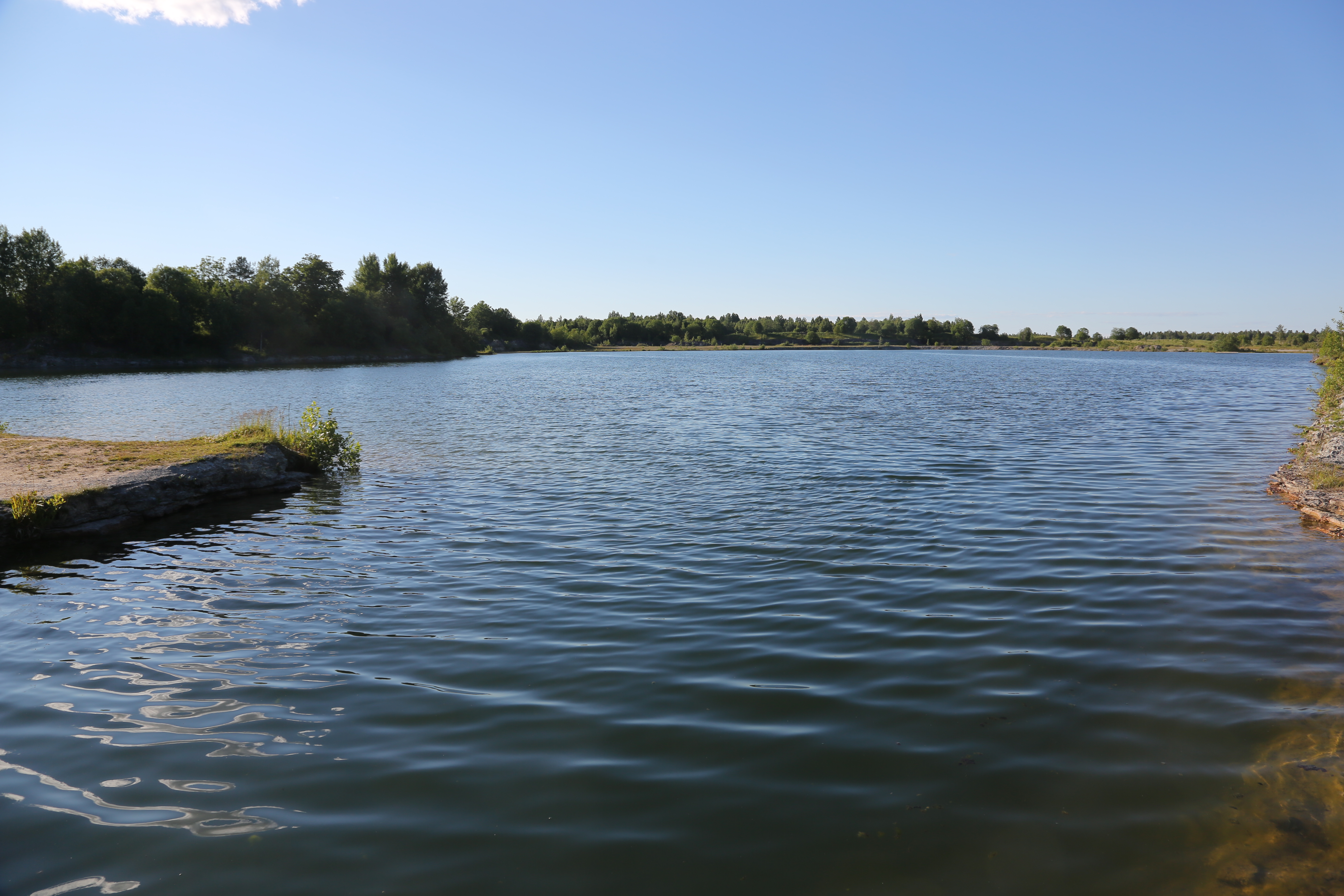
- Kamariku quarry lake
- Interactive map of Kamariku
- Country: Estonia
- County: Lääne-Viru County
- Parish: Väike-Maarja Parish
- Time zone: UTC+2 (EET)
  - Summer (DST): UTC+3 (EEST)

Kamariku is a village in Väike-Maarja Parish, Lääne-Viru County, in northeastern Estonia. Prior to the administrative reform of Estonian local governments in 2017, the village was part of Rakke Parish.
