= Mustjala =

Village in Estonia

Coordinates: 58°28′N 22°14′E

- Village
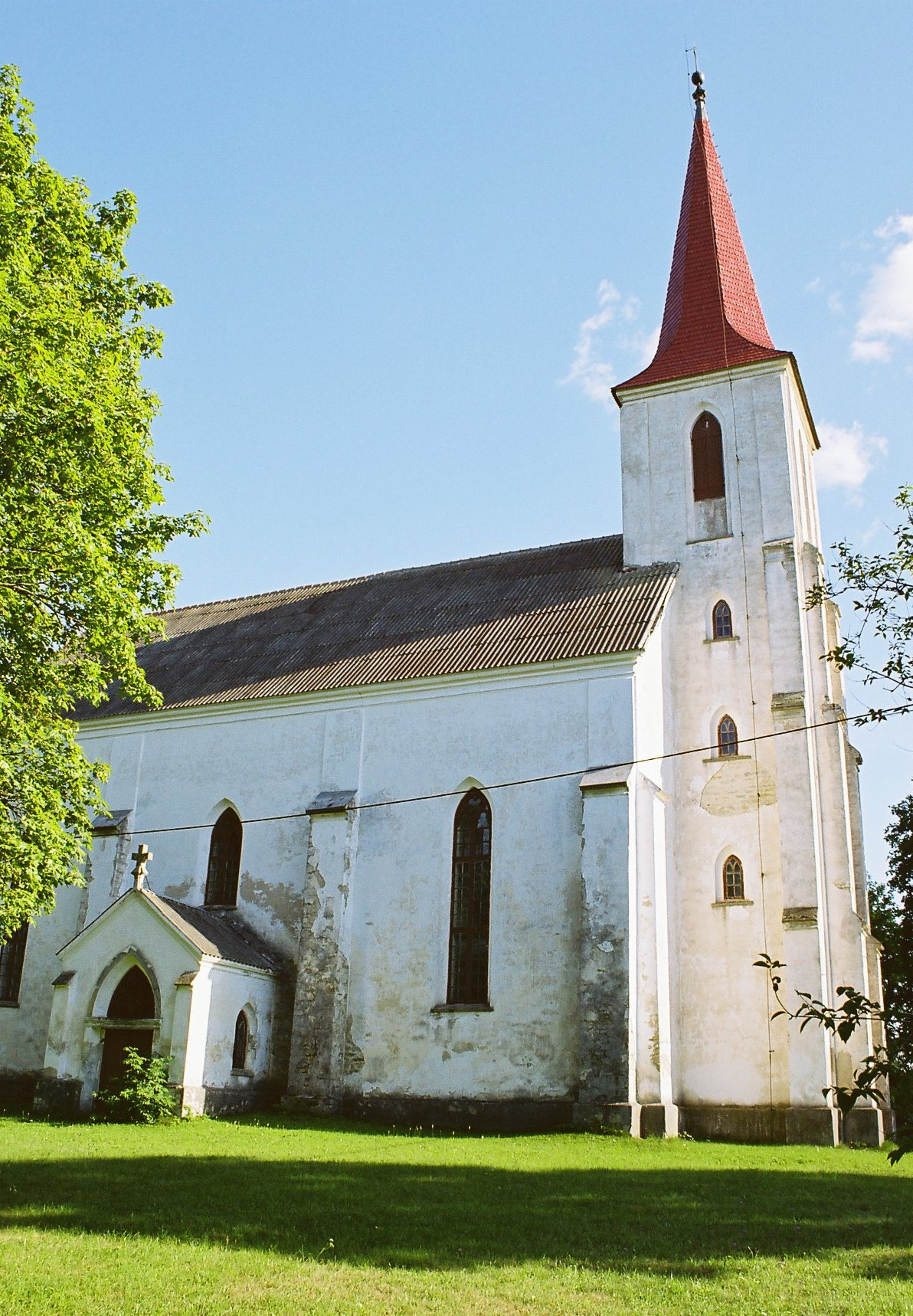
- Mustjala Church
- Interactive map of Mustjala
- Country: Estonia
- County: Saare County
- Parish: Saaremaa Parish
- Time zone: UTC+2 (EET)
  - Summer (DST): UTC+3 (EEST)

Mustjala is a village in Saaremaa Parish, Saare County in western Estonia.

Before the administrative reform in 2017, the village was in Mustjala Parish.

The Admiralty Baltic Pilot Vol II mentions Mustjala Church, a white stone building with a dark roof, as a 'useful mark' for shipping.

== Name ==
Mustjala was attested in historical sources as Mustell in 1592. The name of the village is believed to be derived from the anthroponym *Mustjalg (genitive: *Mustjala) 'black leg'.

== Notable people ==
Notable people who were born or lived in Mustjala include:

- Paul Saagpakk (1910–1996), linguist and lexicographer
