= Rein Saluri =

Estonian writer and playwright (1939–2023)

Rein Saluri (22 September 1939 – 13 October 2023) was an Estonian writer and playwright.

== Biography ==
Rein Saluri was born in Tammiku, Salla Parish (now part of Väike-Maarja Parish). In 1946, when he was seven, Saluri, along with his family, was deported to Tobolsk by Soviet authorities. They were later permitted to return to Estonia in 1951. Saluri graduated from Tartu State University with a degree in biology in 1964.1962–1989, he was a member of Communist Party of the Soviet Union.

Saluri worked as an editor for editors of the popular science magazine Horisont, the youth journal Noorus, the literary magazine Looming and as the literary editor for the Estonian Drama Theatre in Tallinn from 1972 until 1975. He was a member of the Estonian Writers' Union since 1974.

Saluri wrote psychological short stories and plays, as well as children's literature.

In 1966, Saluri wed translator and diplomat Piret Saluri (née Rõuk).

Saluri died on 13 October 2023, at the age 84.

== Awards ==
- Friedebert Tuglas short story award (1973)
- Juhan Smuul literary award (1977)
- Friedebert Tuglas Short Story Award (1981)
- Juhan Smuul literary award (1983)
- Honored Writer of the Estonian SSR
- Friedebert Tuglas Short Story Award (1988)
- Juhan Smuul Annual Literature Prize (1989)
- Order of the White Star, V Class (2001)

== Selected works ==
- short story "Mälu" (1972)
- play "Külalised" (1974)
- short story "Kõnelused" (1976)
- short story "Rebane räästa all" (1979)
- short story "Üks, kaks ja korraga" (1983)
- short story "Puusõda" (1985)
- short story "Vaikne elu" (1988)
- play "Minek" (1989)
