= Oesel meteorite =

Meteorite found in Estonia

Oesel
- Type: Stone
- Class: L chondrite
- Group: L6
- Country: Estonia
- Region: Merise, Saaremaa
- Coordinates: 58°29′30″N 22°08′00″E
- Fall date: May 11, 1855
- Found date: May 11, 1855
- Alternative names: Kaande, Kaanda

The Oesel meteorite, also known as the Kaande meteorite (Estonian: Kaande meteoriit) or Kaanda meteorite, was a meteorite that fell in the village of Merise on the island of Saaremaa (formerly known as Oesel), Estonia, in 1855.

On May 11, 1855, a meteorite shower occurred, after which meteorite fragments were found on land belonging to the Kaanda farm in the village of Merise. The Oesel meteorite is a common stony meteorite, and it contains characteristic olivine-hypersthene chondrites up to 0.25 millimeters (0.0098 in) in diameter. It had a mass of 6 kilograms (13 lb). This is the first meteorite in Estonia for which eyewitness descriptions have survived.
