= Kiruma =

Village in Estonia

- Village
- Interactive map of Kiruma
- Coordinates: 58°28′N 22°23′E
- Country: Estonia
- County: Saare County
- Parish: Saaremaa Parish
- Time zone: UTC+2 (EET)
  - Summer (DST): UTC+3 (EEST)

Kiruma is a village in Saaremaa Parish in the Saare County in Estonia.

In year 1976 the village was left empty, currently the village is inhabited by two families.

On 16. June 2010, after 19 years of active lobbying by village inhabitants, electricity was provided to the village. Before that Estonian energy monopoly Eesti Energia was denying the requests by saying they are not the owners of old powerlines and therefore inhabitants have pay for renovation themselves.

Before the administrative reform in 2017, the village was in Mustjala Parish.
