= Panga, Saare County =

Village in Estonia

Panga
- Village
- Location in Estonia Panga (Europe)
- Coordinates: 58.560556°N 22.313611°E
- Country: Estonia
- County: Saare County
- Parish: Saaremaa Parish
- Time zone: UTC+2 (EET)
  - Summer (DST): UTC+3 (EEST)

Panga is a village in Saaremaa Parish, Saare County, in western Estonia.

== Geography ==
Panga Cliff is located on the coast close to the village.

== Name ==
Panga was attested in historical sources as Pancker orth (probably referring to the cliff) in 1554, and as Pancke and Pank in 1645. The name of the village comes from the common noun pank (genitive panga) 'steep rocky coast, bluff, cliff', which is borrowed from Swedish bank 'slope; ridge' or Low German bank 'slope, sandy ridge', probably also influenced by Estonian Swedish baŋk 'rampart on the ground or beach, hardened soil'.

== History ==
Before the administrative reform of 2017, the village was in Mustjala Parish.
