= Piret Saluri =

Estonian translator and diplomat (born 1943)

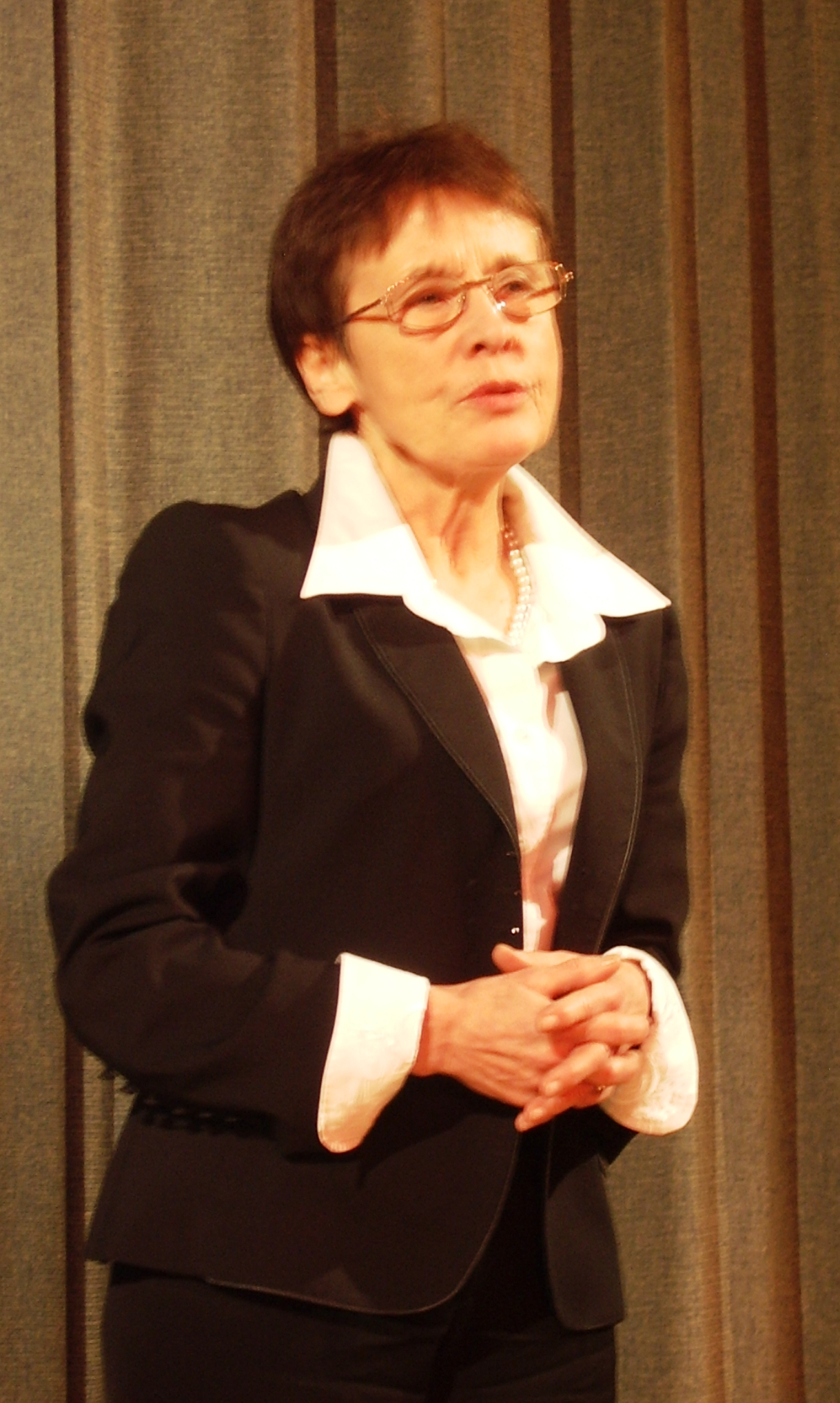
- Born: October 22, 1943 (age 82); Tallinn, Estonia
- Education: University of Tartu
- Occupations: Translator and diplomat
- Spouse: Rein Saluri (m. 1966; died 2023)

Piret Saluri (née Piret Rõuk; born October 22, 1943) is an Estonian translator and diplomat.

== Education ==
Piret Saluri studied at Märjamaa High School and Tallinn High School No. 21, where she graduated in 1962. In 1962, she entered Tartu State University to study medicine. In 1971, she graduated from the university's Estonian philology program in the journalism track with her thesis Isikuintervjuu mõnedest probleemidest (The Personal Interview about Some Problems), supervised by Helle Tiisväli.

== Career ==
From 1964 to 1972, Saluri worked at Estonian Television, first as an editor of children's and youth programs, and later literary programs. From 1972 to 1975 she was part of the editorship of the magazines Pioneer and Täheke. From 1975 to 1990, she was a freelance translator.

From 1991 to 1995, she worked at the Estonian Embassy in Helsinki as first embassy secretary, and from 1995 to 2002 she was the chief of protocol for the president of Estonia.

== Creative work ==
Piret Saluri has translated over fifty works into Estonian, mainly from Finnish, and to a lesser extent from English and Russian. Saluri's translations include Finnish and Russian classics (Vasily Aksyonov, Pentti Saarikoski, Paavo Haavikko, Mika Waltari, Marja-Liisa Vartio, Antti Tuuri, Antti Hyry, Olli Jalonen, and Sirpa Kähkönen) as well as top works of children's literature (E. B. White's Charlotte's Web, and Hannu Mäkelä's The Horse Who Lost His Glasses and Mr. Hoo), as well as essays and non-fiction (Olavi Paavolainen's Guest of the Third Reich, Kai Laitinen's History of Finnish Literature, Matti Klinge's A Short History of Finland, and Jussi Talvi's History of Gastronomy), and audio plays (Kaj Kalin's In the Blood, Hannu Mäkelä's Leino Goes to Estonia and The Beginning of His New Life, Paavo Haavikko's King Harald, Farewell, Markku Envall's The Story of Mr. Clay, Lasse Raustela's The Death of Murri-Purri, Pentti Saarikoski's Maria and Methodius and The Field of the Loon (Finnish: Kuikan pelto). Finland's Mika Waltari Society described Saluri's translations as follows: "Piret Saluri has managed to capture Waltari's style down to the subtleties: in these books, Mika Waltari speaks to us in Estonian!"

Piret Saluri is a corresponding member of the Finnish Literature Society (since 1987), a member of the Finnish Association of Translators and Interpreters (since 1988), and a member of the Estonian Writers' Union (since 1990). From 2020 to 2022, she was a member of the council of the Kultuurileht Foundation (Estonian: Sihtasutus Kultuurileht).

== Personal life ==
Piret Saluri's paternal grandfather was the lawyer, military officer, and former Minister of the Interior Theodor Rõuk. She married the writer Rein Saluri in 1966.

== Awards and recognitions ==
- 1987: Finnish National Translator of Literature Award
- 2001: Order of the Lion of Finland
- 2003: Order of the White Star, Fourth Class
- 2003: Erkki Wilho Ponkala Foundation Lifetime Achievement Award
- 2009: Annual Prize of the Endowment for Literature of the Cultural Endowment of Estonia (Estonian: Eesti Kultuurkapitali kirjanduse sihtkapitali aastapreemia) (fiction translation from a foreign language into Estonian: Mika Waltari's The Egyptian)
- 2010: Honorary member of the Finnish Writers' Union
- 2012: Olavi Paavolainen Medal
- 2014: Honorary member of the Mika Waltari Society
- 2015: Aino Kallas Award
- 2018: Lifetime Achievement Award of the Endowment for Literature of the Cultural Endowment of Estonia (Estonian: Eesti Kultuurkapitali kirjanduse sihtkapitali elutööpreemia)
- 2023: Erkki Wilho Ponkala Award
