= Võhma, Saaremaa Parish =

Village in Estonia

Võhma
- Village
- Location in Estonia
- Coordinates: 58°31′54″N 22°20′30″E
- Country: Estonia
- County: Saare County
- Municipality: Saaremaa Parish

Population (01.01.2000)
  - Total: 148

Võhma is a village in Saaremaa Parish, Saare County, Estonia. It is located on the northern coast of Saaremaa, the largest island in Estonia. The village had a population of 148 (as of 1 January 2000).

Before the administrative reform in 2017, the village was in Mustjala Parish.

Võhma is a site of an ancient Oeselian settlement from the Viking Age.
