= Tammiku, Väike-Maarja Parish =

Village in Estonia

Coordinates: 58°59′26″N 26°19′39″E

Tammiku
- Village
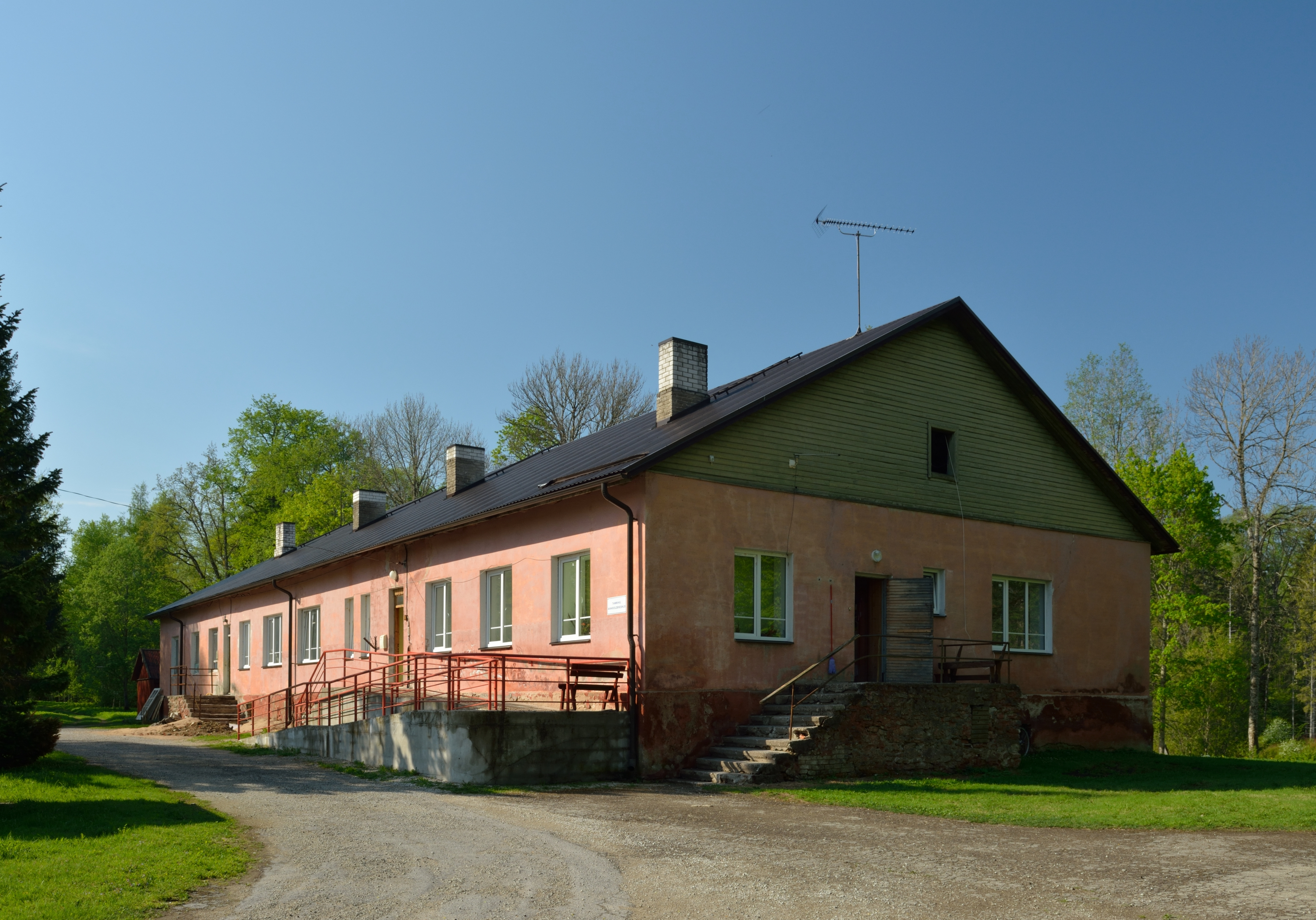
- Tammiku Manor
- Interactive map of Tammiku
- Country: Estonia
- County: Lääne-Viru County
- Parish: Väike-Maarja Parish
- Time zone: UTC+2 (EET)
  - Summer (DST): UTC+3 (EEST)

Tammiku is a village in Väike-Maarja Parish, Lääne-Viru County, in northeastern Estonia. Prior to the 2017 administrative reform of Estonian local governments, the village was part of Rakke Parish.

== Name ==
The village was originally called Suure-Tammiku (literally, 'big Tammiku') in contrast to neighboring Väike-Tammiku (literally, 'little Tammiku'). It was attested in written records as Tamicas in 1241 (referring to the village), as Gross-Tamkas in 1526 (referring to the manor), and as Сууръ-Таммикъ c. 1900. The name (in the genitive case) comes from the common noun tammik 'oak forest', referring to the local vegetation.

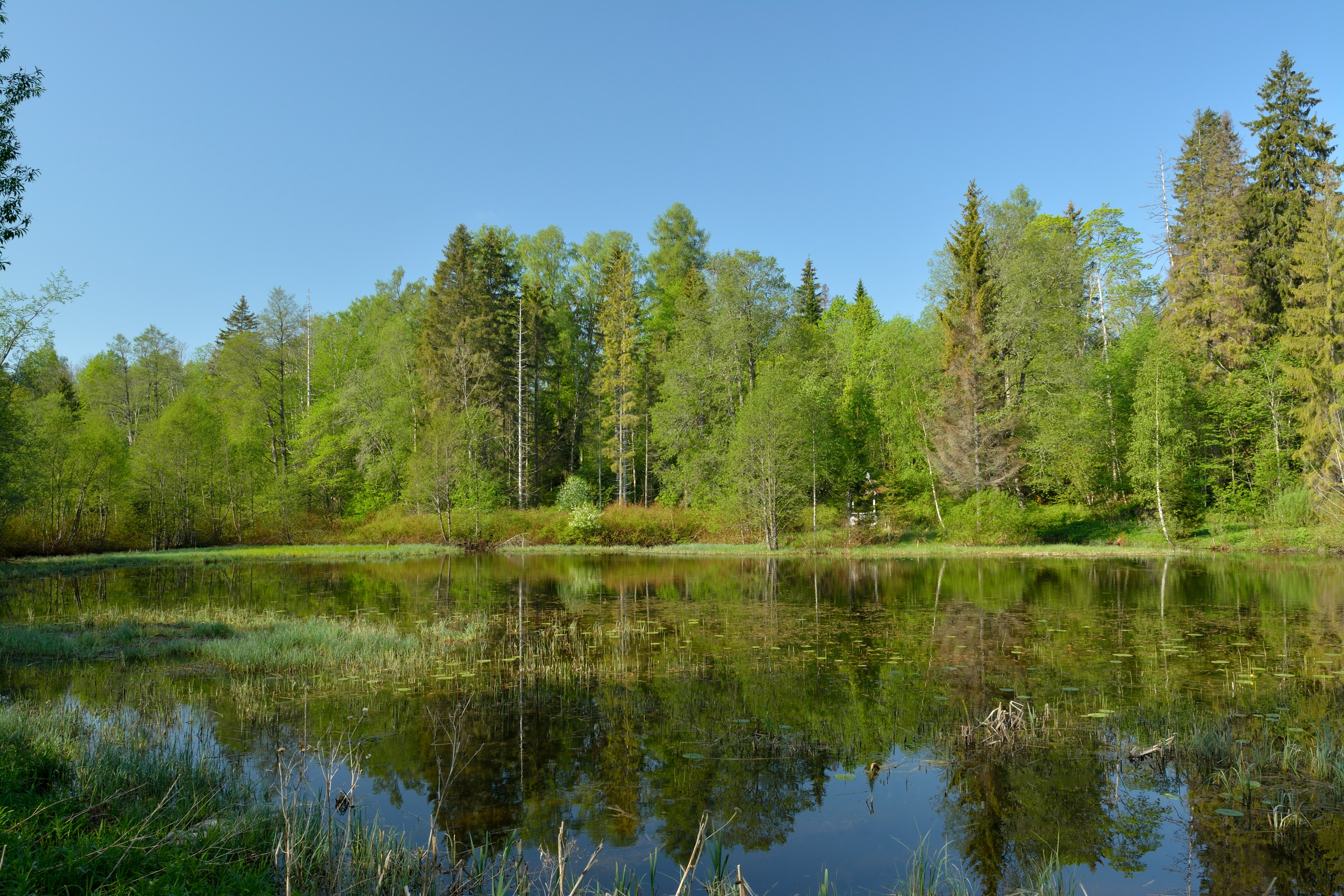
Väike-Tammiku lake
