= Väike-Tammiku =

Village in Estonia

- Village
- Location within Estonia
- Coordinates: 59°0′N 26°19′E
- Country: Estonia
- County: Lääne-Viru County
- Parish: Väike-Maarja Parish
- Time zone: UTC+2 (EET)
  - Summer (DST): UTC+3 (EEST)

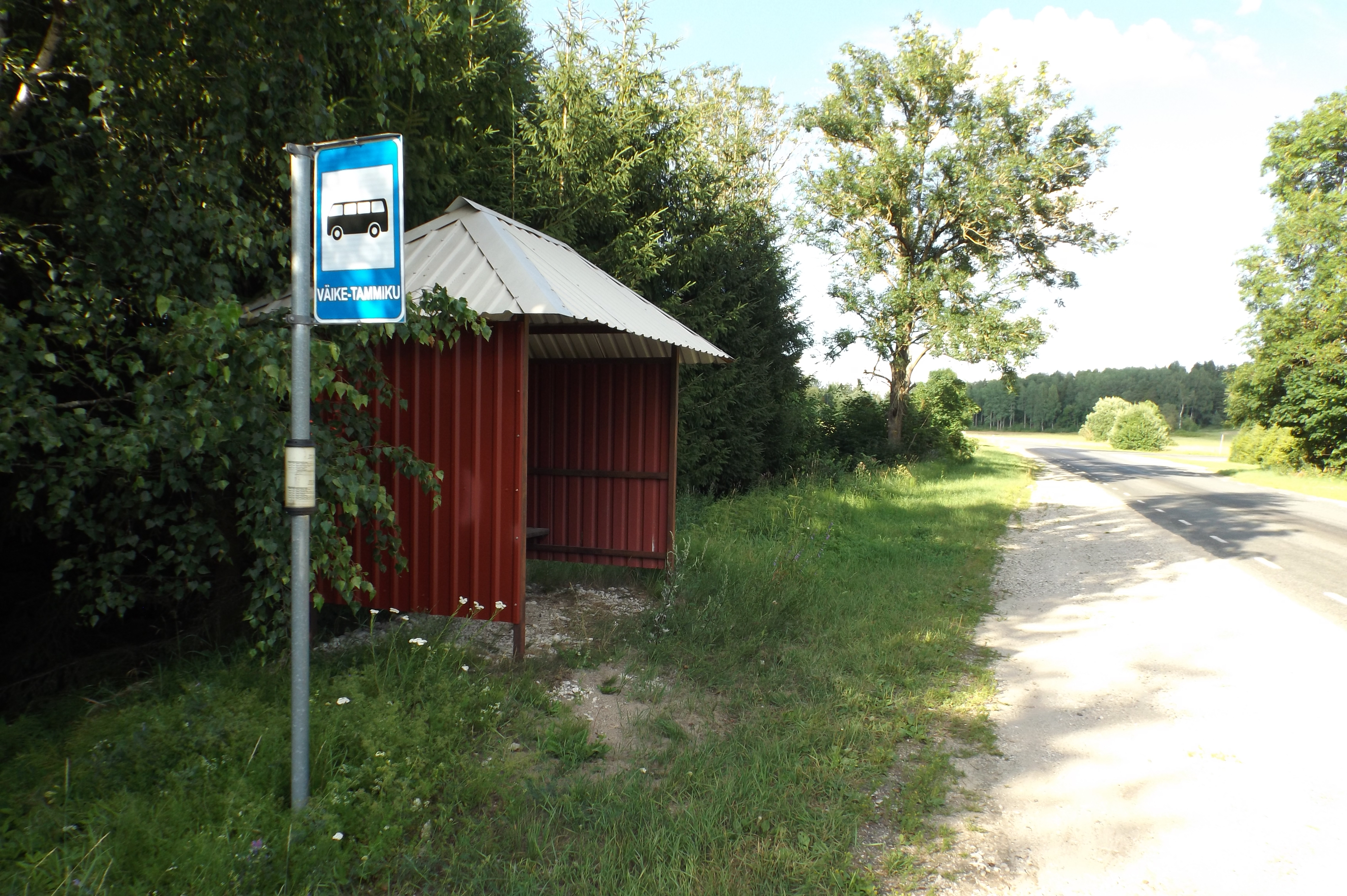
Bus stop in Väike-Tammiku village on the Kapu-Rakke-Paasvere road.

Väike-Tammiku is a village in Väike-Maarja Parish, Lääne-Viru County, in northeastern Estonia.

== Name ==
The name Väike-Tammiku literally means 'little Tammiku', and it contrasted with neighboring Suure-Tammiku (literally, 'big Tammiku'), which is now simply called Tammiku. The village was attested in written sources as Tamicas in 1241 and Klein Tammick in 1726. The name (in the genitive case) comes from the common noun tammik 'oak forest', referring to the local vegetation.
