= Rein Veidemann =

Estonian literary scholar and politician

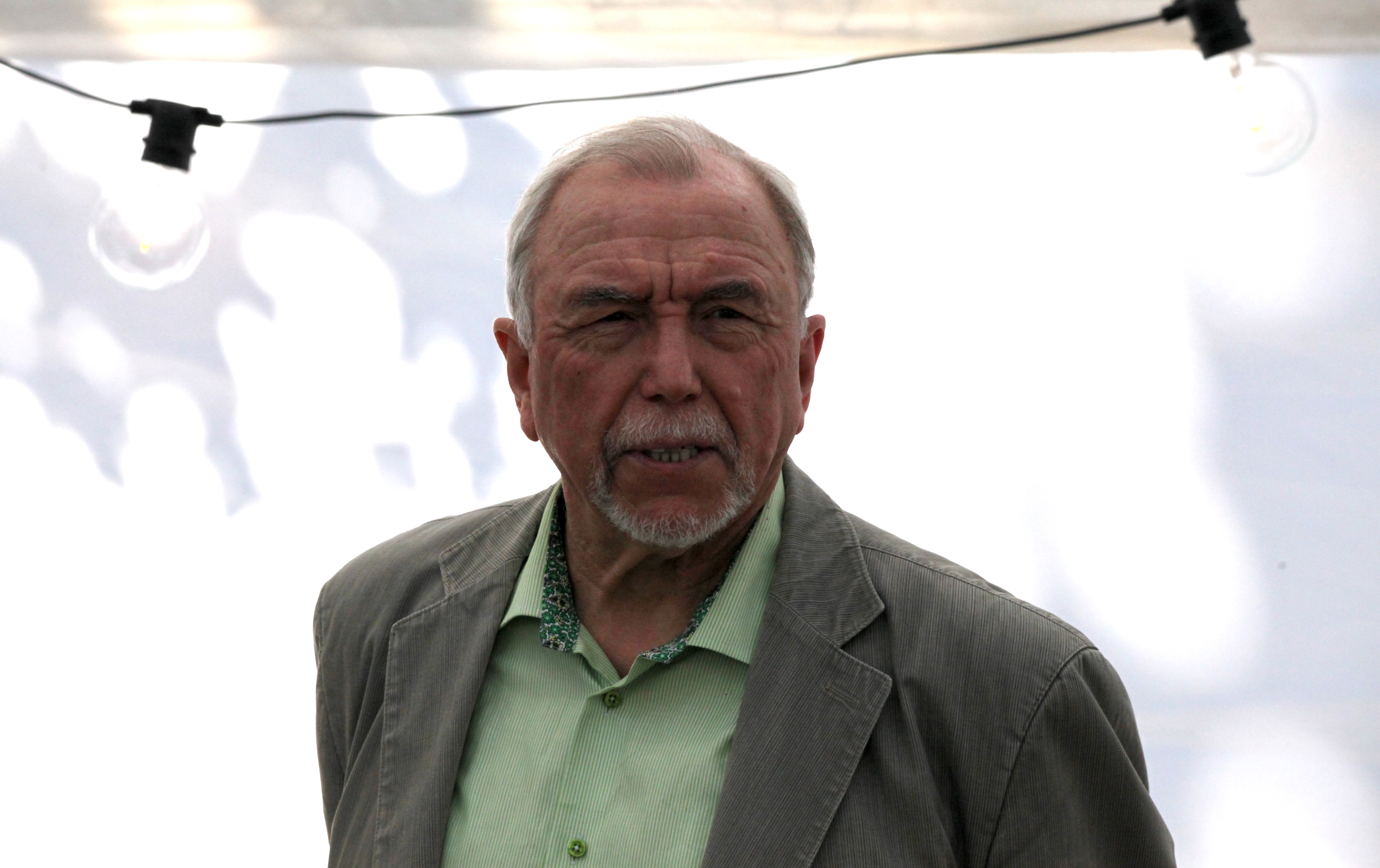
- Rein Veidemann at the annual Literary Street festival 2021 in Tallinn, Estonia
- Born: 17 October 1946; Pärnu
- Spouse(s): Andra Veidemann

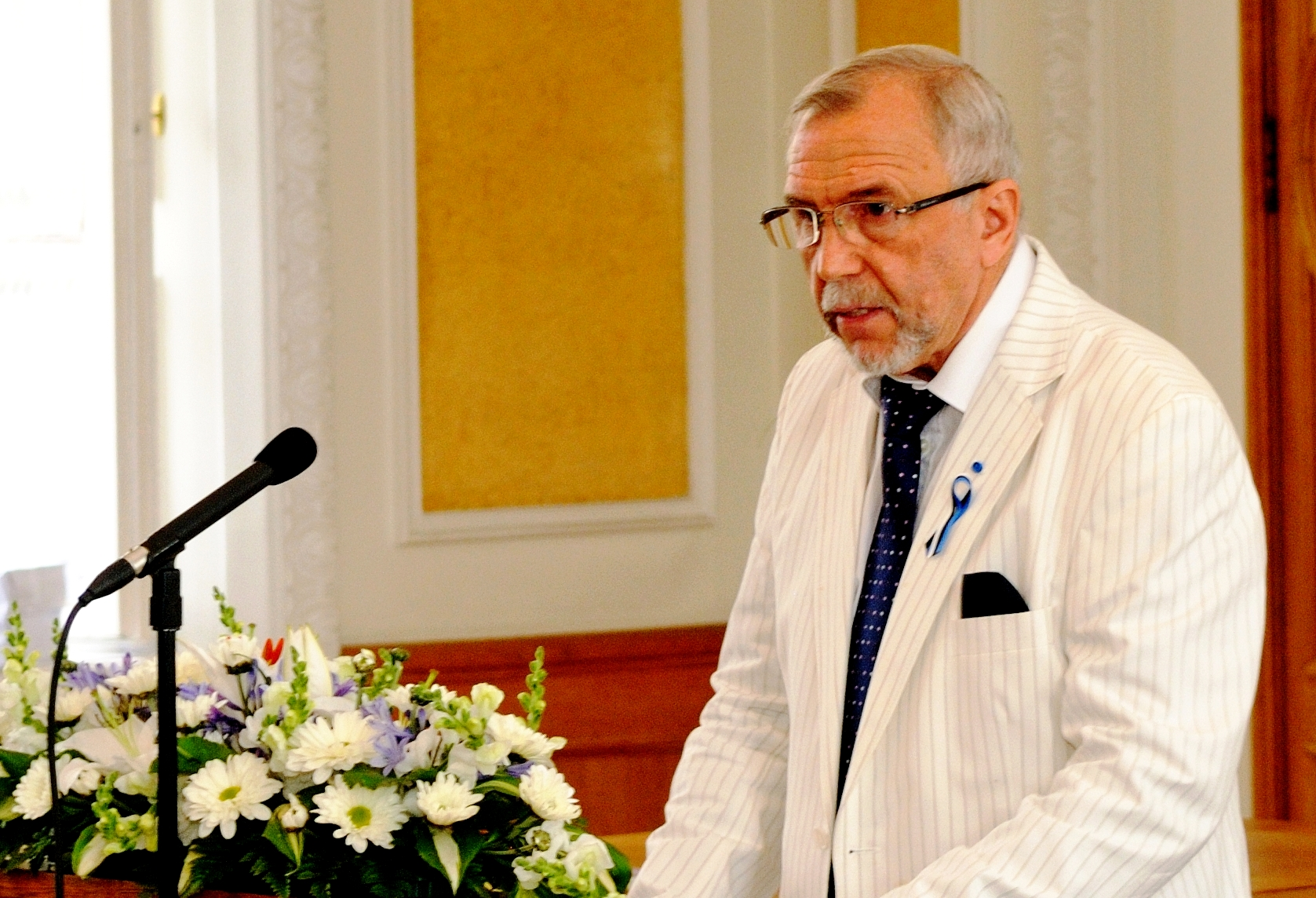
Rein Veidemann

Rein Veidemann (born 17 October 1946, in Pärnu) is an Estonian literary scholar and politician. He was a member of VII Riigikogu.

== Awards and recognitions ==
- 2009: Aino Kallas Award
