= Olju =

Village in Estonia

Coordinates: 58°56′18″N 26°17′08″E

- Village
- Interactive map of Olju
- Country: Estonia
- County: Lääne-Viru County
- Parish: Väike-Maarja Parish
- Time zone: UTC+2 (EET)
  - Summer (DST): UTC+3 (EEST)

Olju is a village in Väike-Maarja Parish, Lääne-Viru County, in northeastern Estonia.

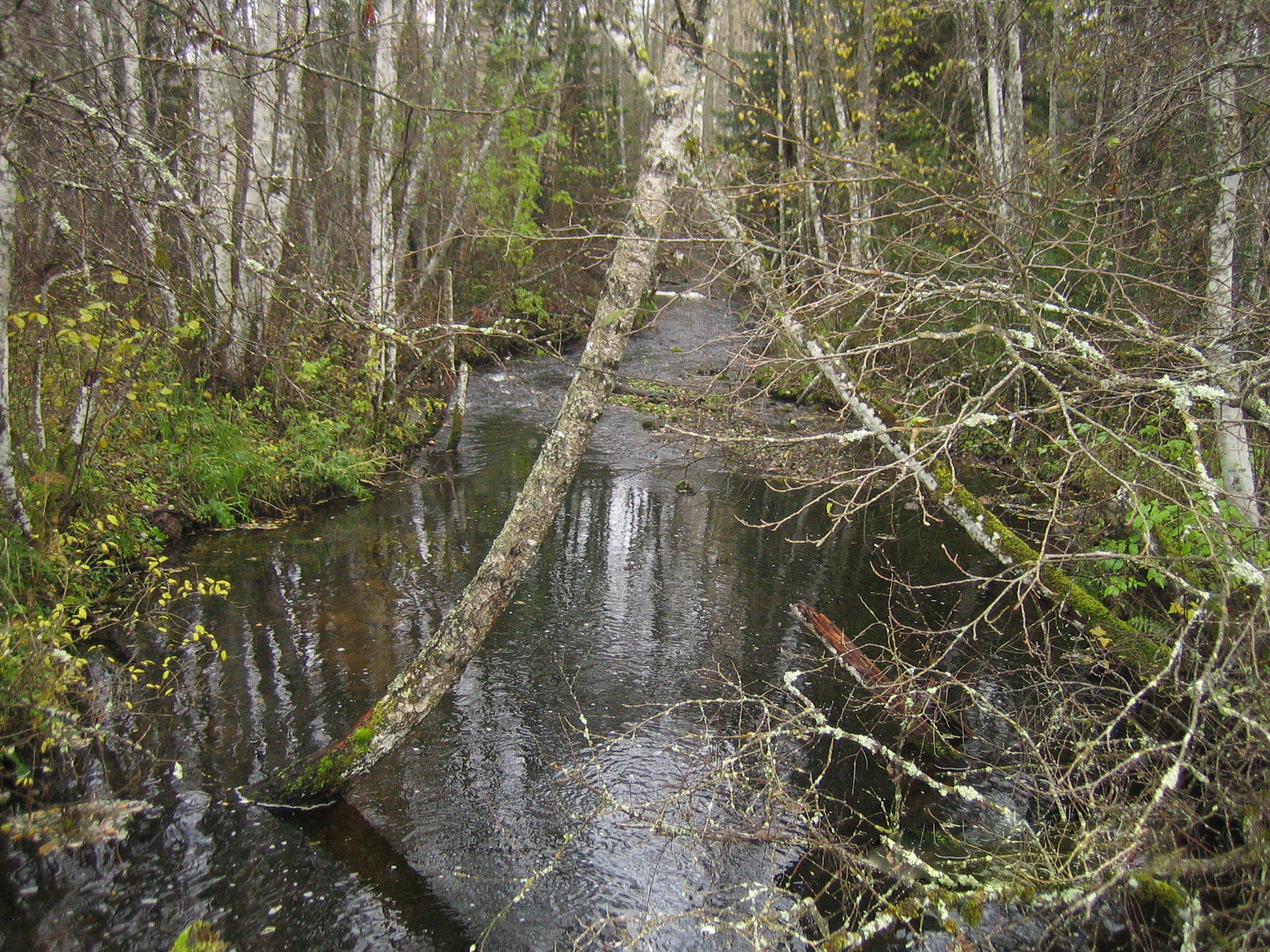
Onga River on the border of Olju and Edru villages.
