= Kulle Raig =

Estonian journalist and writer (born 1940)

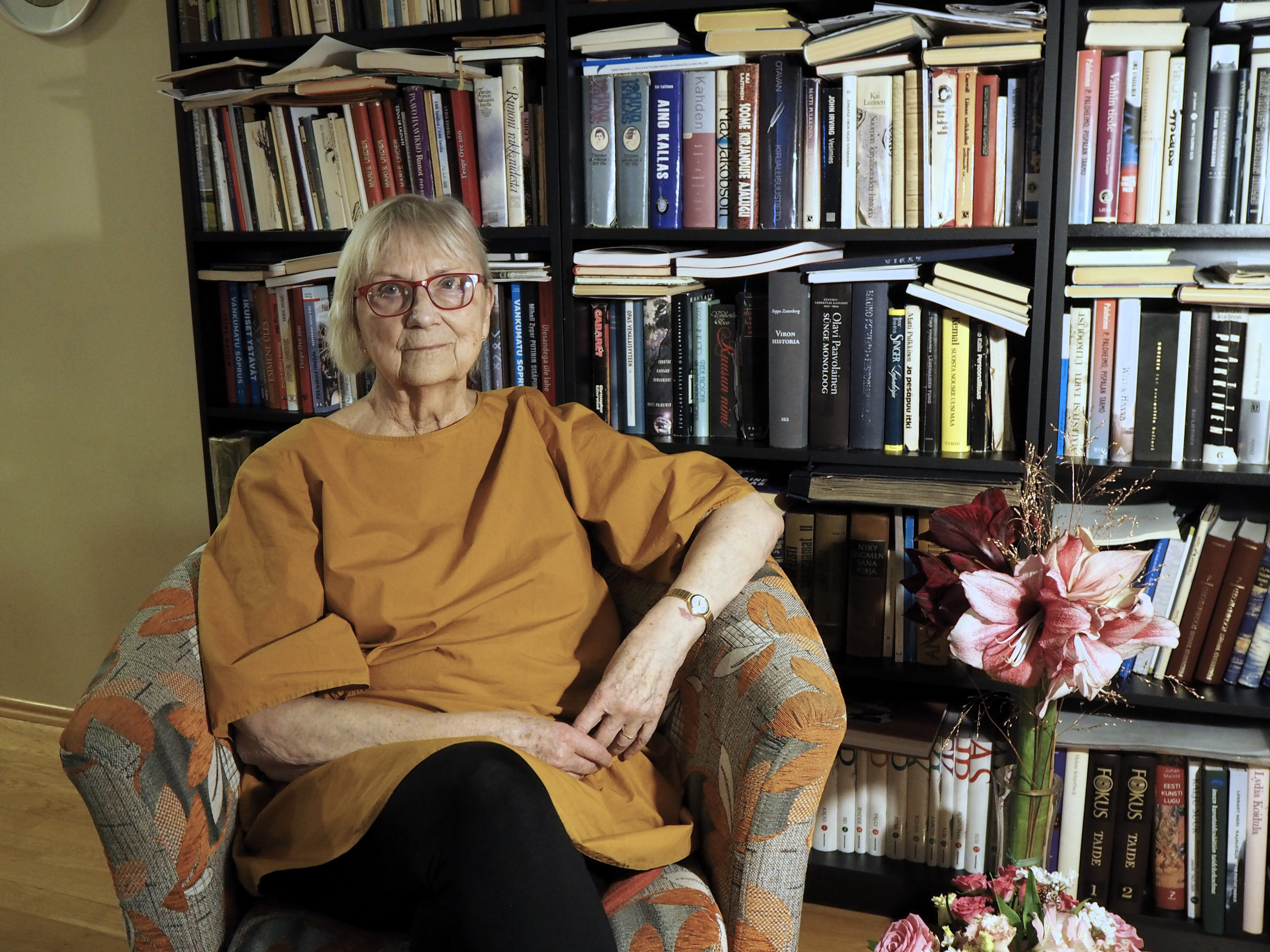
- Raig in 2025
- Born: December 2, 1940 (age 85); Tallinn, Estonia
- Education: University of Tartu
- Occupations: Journalist; writer

Kulle Raig (née Kulle-Küllike Alasi; born December 2, 1940) is an Estonian journalist, writer, and cultural figure.

== Early life and education ==
Kulle Raig was born in Tallinn, the daughter of Aleksander Alasi (1907–1985) and Julia Alasi (née Küla, 1907–1996). She graduated from Tallinn Secondary School No. 16 in 1959 and from the Finno-Ugric Department of Tartu University in 1964.

== Career ==
Raig worked as a guide and translator for Intourist from 1972 to 1975 and as an editor of Estonian Radio programs in Finnish from 1975 to 1989. She then worked as a cultural editor for the Finnish Broadcasting Company in Finland (1990) and as the head of the Estonian Cultural Center in Helsinki (1991). She was the Estonian consul in Helsinki from 1991 to 1992 and the cultural and press advisor of the Helsinki embassy from 1992 to 1998. She founder the Estonian Institute in Helsinki and headed it from 1995 to 1998, and she was the general secretary of the Union of Finnish–Estonian Associations from 1999 to 2006.

== Works ==
- 2003: Saaremaa valss (Saaremaa Waltz), Varrak
- 2003: Vikerkaare värvid (Rainbow Colors), Varrak
- 2006: Urho Kekkonen ja Eesti (Urho Kekkonen and Estonia), K&K (coauthor)
- 2009: Esimene üle (First Up), K&K
- 2012: Pikk teekond lähedale (A Long Journey to Nearby), K&K

In addition, she has translated books from Finnish to Estonian as well as from Estonian to Finnish.

== Awards and recognitions ==
- 2000: Order of the National Coat of Arms, fourth-class medal
- 2004: Aino Kallas Award

== Family ==
Kulle Raig was married to the volleyball player Peet Raig (1938–1998).
