= List of cliffs of Estonia =

This is a list of cliffs in Estonia.

| Name | Location (county, parish) | Maximum height (m) | Further info | Image |
|---|---|---|---|---|
| Aseri cliff | Lääne-Viru County, Viru-Nigula Parish | | | |
| Leetse cliff | Harju County, Lääne-Harju Parish | | | |
| Ohessaare cliff | Saare County | | | |
| Ontika cliff | Ida-Viru County | 56 | | |
| Panga cliff | Saare County | | | |
| Pulli cliff/escarpment (Oiu cliff/escarpment) | Saare County | | | |
| Rannamõisa cliff | Harju County, Harku Parish | | | |
| Türisalu cliff | | 30 | It has garnered a negative reputation as a suicide hotspot, especially among younger people. | |
| Ülgase cliff | Harju County | | | |
| Üügu Cliff | Saare County, Muhu Parish | | Cliff's length is about 300 m | |
