= Panga Cliff =

Coastal cliff in Estonia

Coordinates: 58.570177°N 22.287998°E

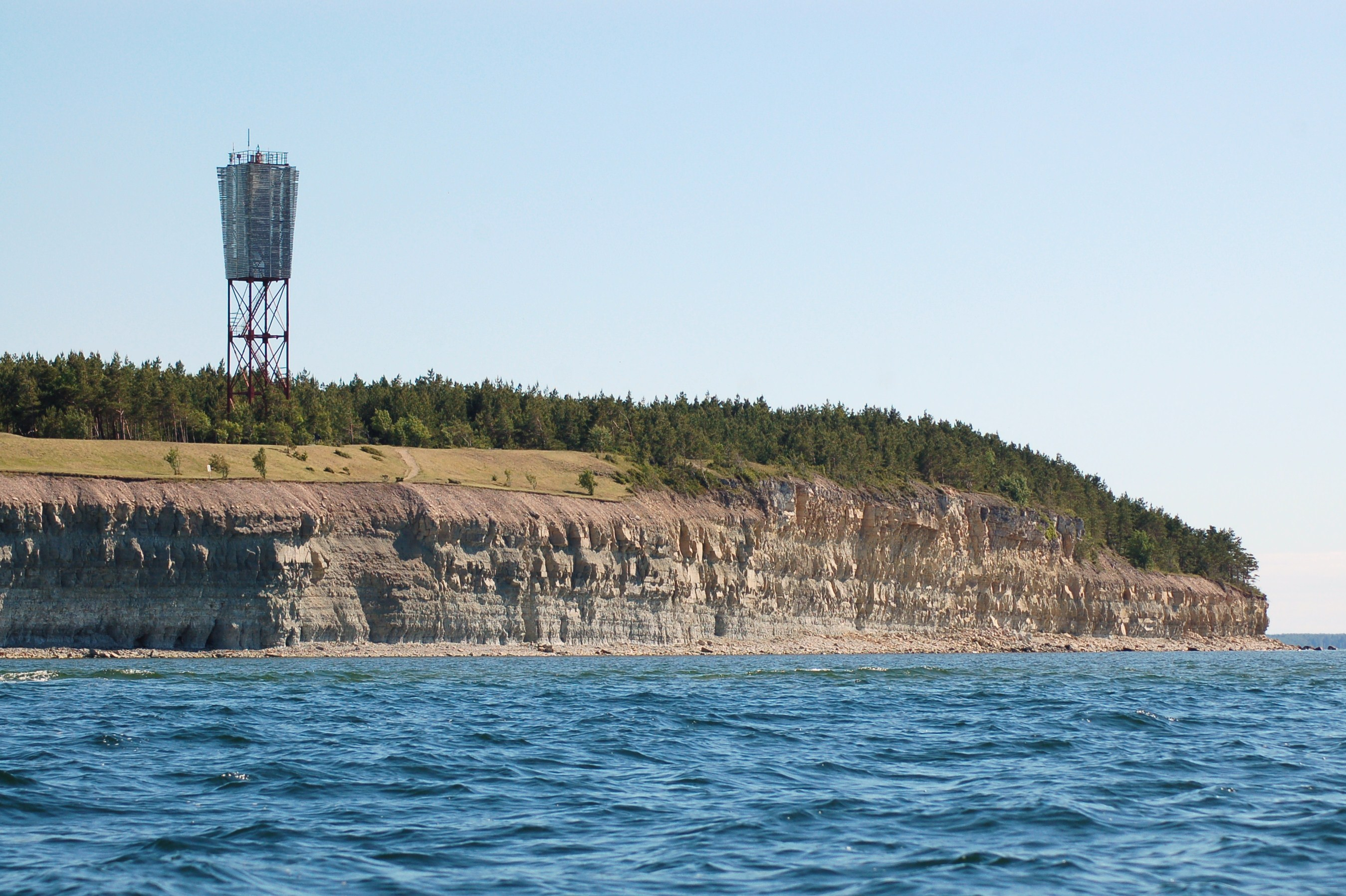
Panga Cliff viewed from the sea

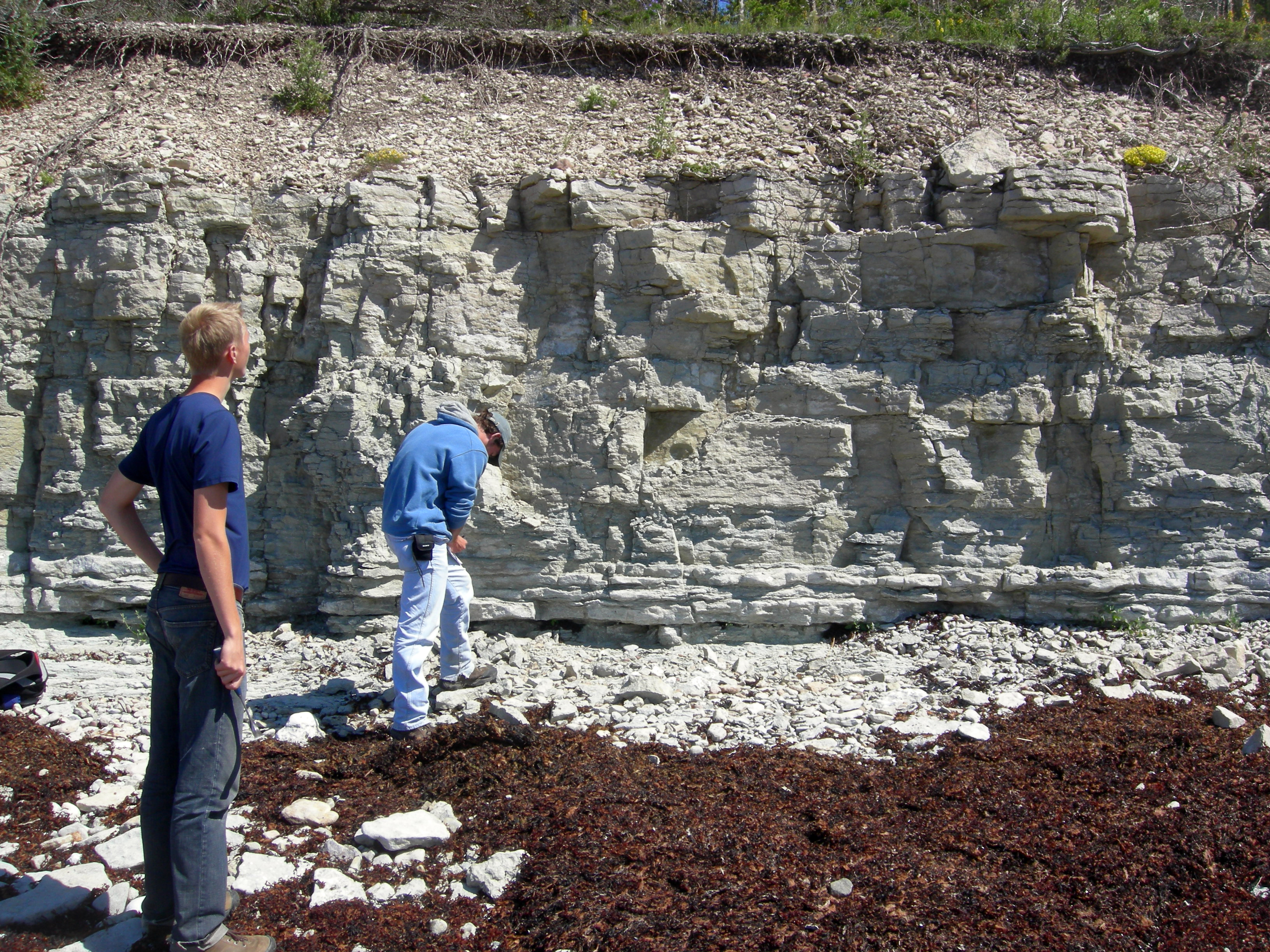
Geologists studying the Jaani Formation (Silurian, Wenlock) at Panga Cliff

Panga Cliff (Estonian: Panga pank; also Mustjala Cliff, Mustjala pank) is a coastal cliff located on the northern shore of Saaremaa, at the end of the road from Kuressaare to Võhma, close to the village of Panga. It is the highest of the Saaremaa and Muhu cliffs, reaching a height of 20 meters (66 ft). The entire cliff is approximately 2.5 kilometers (1.6 mi) long.

Panga Cliff consists of at least three terraces. In addition to the main cliff, there is a smaller cliff located further inland, and an underwater cliff with a height of about 10 to 12 meters (33 to 39 ft) jutting a few hundred meters into the sea.
