= Rennenkampff =

Baltic German noble family

House of Rennenkampff Haus Rennenkampff
- Noble family
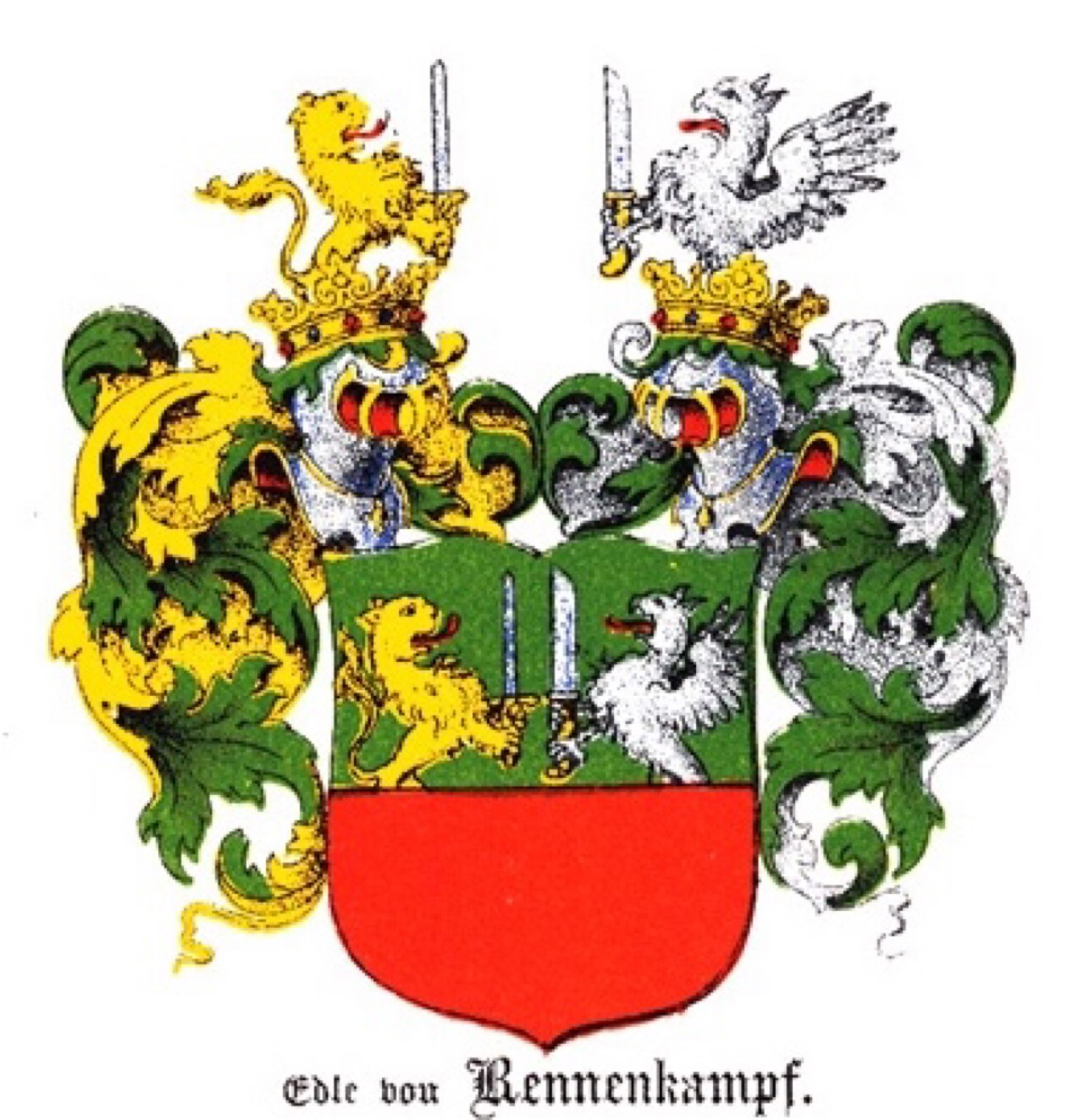
- Coat of arms of the Edle Rennenkampff family of 1728, in the Baltic coat of arms book by Carl Arvid von Klingspor in 1882
- Country: Historical: Holy Roman Empire; Kingdom of Sweden; Russian Empire; Baltic Governorates; German Empire; Current: Germany
- Earlier spellings: Remenkampe, Remmenkamp
- Origin: Osnabrück, Westphalia
- Founded: 16th century
- Titles: Edler
- Estate: Several

The Rennenkampff family (Note: The spelling of his last name varies in different works between Rennenkampff or Rennenkampf. Earlier spellings also included Remenkampe and Remmenkamp.) is a Baltic-German noble family. It is of Westphalian origin and originated in Osnabrück. They hold the title of Edler.

== History ==
The Rennenkampff family was originally called Remmenkamp, the family is of Imperial German nobility. It is of Westphalian origin and descended from Osnabrück. The first known member is Johann Remmenkamp who lived in Münster in the 15th century.

The first member of the family to appear in the Baltics was Andreas Remmenkamp, who immigrated to Riga in the mid-16th century. His son Jürgen (1575–1602/1612) was enrolled into Imperial nobility, granted untitled noble status with the von and the surname Rennenkampff by Holy Roman Emperor Rudolf II in 1602.

The Rennenkampffs were made famous by Jürgen's grandson Joachim (1618–1658), who was a jurist working in Riga during the 17th century in Swedish Livonia. With the death of Georg von Rennenkampff (1652–1710) in 1710, the family split into two branches: the senior Palloper headed by Georg's older son Franz (1678–1727), and the junior Helmet headed by his younger son of the same name. In 1728, Georg II von Rennenkampff was a Russian district court assessor of Pernau and was granted the title of Edler by Emperor Charles VI. They were enrolled into the Livonian, Estonian and Couronian Knighthoods in 1745, 1752 and 1801. In 1909, Karl Otto Woldemar Magnus and his brother Eduard Ernst von Rennenkampff were enrolled into Prussian nobility by Emperor Wilhelm II. During the Russian Civil War, almost all of the family members fled back to Germany.

The Rennenkampff family had a long history of military service in the Swedish and Russian Empires, including Paul Andreas and Karl Friedrich von Rennenkampff, both served in the Imperial Russian Army and fought Napoleon during the early 19th century. Most famous was the WWI general Paul von Rennenkampf. Many from the family were high-ranking officers and many had received the German award Pour le Mérite.

== Notables ==
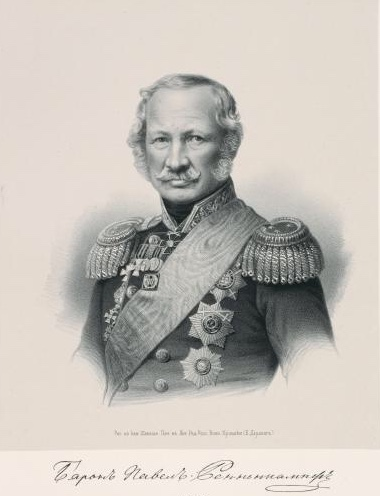
Paul Andreas von Rennenkampff

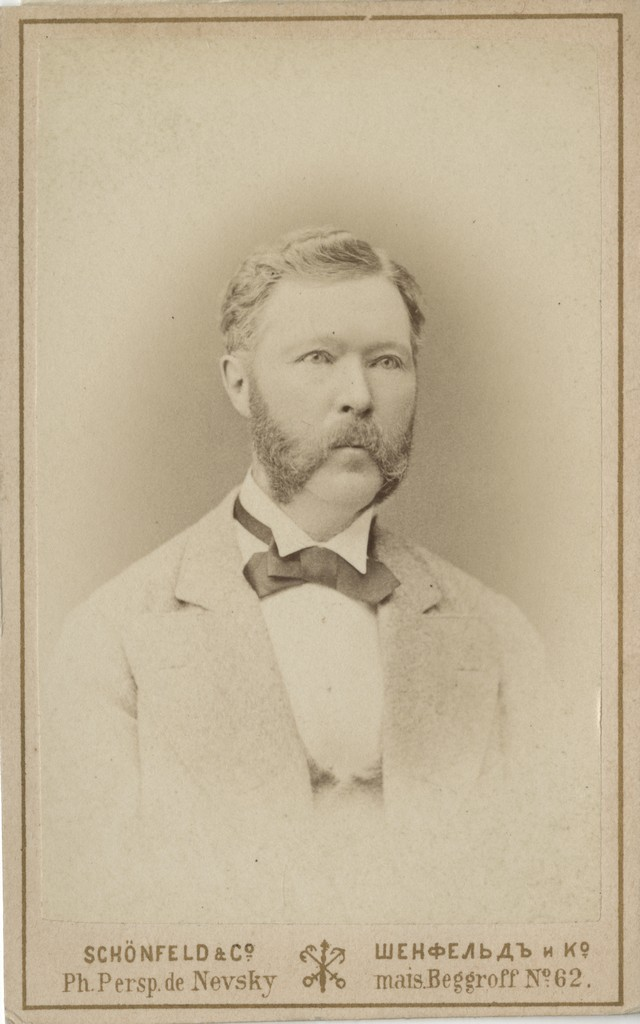
Adam Andreas von Rennenkampff

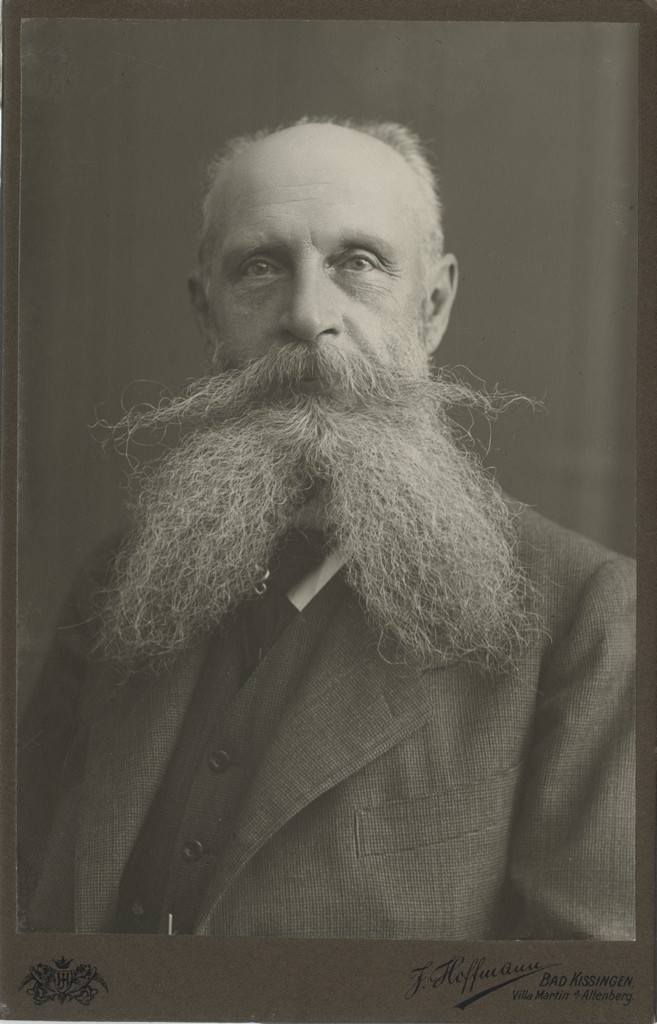
Woldemar Konstantin von Rennenkampff

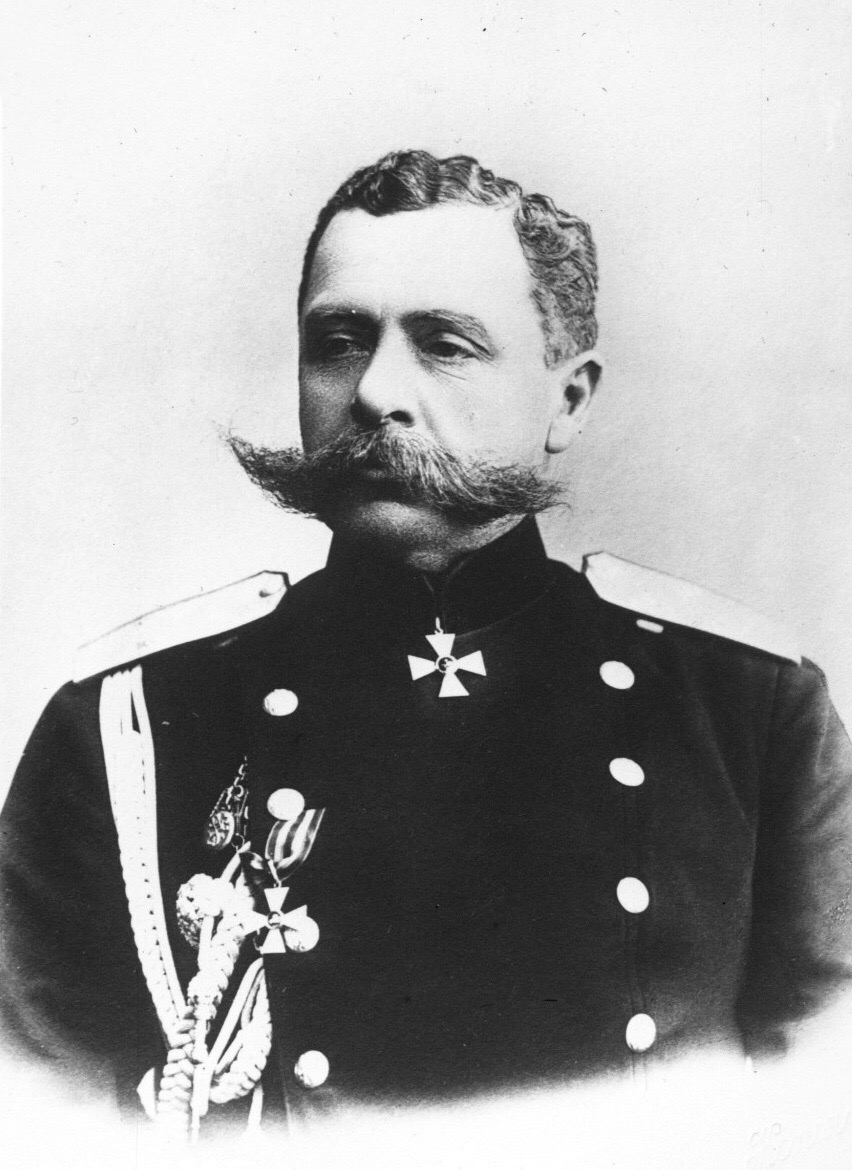
Paul Georg von Rennenkampff

=== Baltic line ===
The Baltic lines mainly consists of the Lutheran branches of the family:

- Joachim Rennenkampff (1616–1658), jurist, teacher of law in the Riga Academic Gymnasium, since 1645, professor at juris and politic. Later from 1657, a councilor and superintendent in Riga responsible for the city's council office and educations.
- Jakob Gustav von Rennenkampff (1716–1791), land counselor to the local Estonian Government and landowner.
- Johann Dietrich von Rennenkampff (1719–1781), lieutenant-general, participant of the Russo-Turkish War of 1768-1774.
- Christer Johann von Rennenkampff (1777–1864), deputy governor-general of the Pskov Governorate.
- Gustav Reinhold Georg von Rennenkampff (1784–1869), officer in the army of Saxe-Coburg-Saalfeld, politician and economist, responsible for the abolishment of serfdom in the Livonian Governorate.
- Karl Jakob Alexander von Rennenkampff (1783–1854), writer and cavalryman, chamberlain in the Holstein-Oldenburg and adjutant to Augustus of Oldenburg, first director of the State Museum for Nature and Man in Oldenburg.
- Paul Andreas von Rennenkampff (1790–1857), Russian baron, Lieutenant General, participant of the Napoleonic and Crimean Wars.
- Karl Friedrich von Rennenkampff (1788–1848), Lieutenant General, participant of the Napoleonic and Crimean Wars, vice-director of the Imperial Military Academy from 1843 to 1848.
- Otto Magnus von Rennenkampff (1798/1801-1874), major general, participant of the Hungarian Revolution of 1848.
- Paul Woldemar von Rennenkampff (1817–1891), rear-admiral.
- Adam Andreas von Rennenkampff (1819–1885), captain lieutenant.
- Paul Georg von Rennenkampff (1854–1918), General of the Cavalry, participant of the Russo-Japanese and First World Wars.
- Gert Gustav August von Rennenkampff (1905–1969), clergyman.

=== Russian line ===
The Russian lines mainly consisted of the Orthodox converted branches, mainly because many worked in mainland Russia and many converted to Orthodoxy due to marriages with Russian women as there were very few German women in mainland Russia:

- Konstantin Karlovich Rennenkampf (1826–1896), lawyer, senator, member of the State Council and Active Privy Councillor.
- Dmitri Konstantinovich Rennenkampf (1864–1917), son of the latter, councilor and chamberlain
- Nikolai Karlovich Rennenkampf (1832–1899), jurist, scientist, professor and rector of the St. Vladimir Royal University of Kiev from 1883 to 1887, mayor of Kiev from 1875 to 1879.
- Vladimir Nikolayevich Rennenkampf (1862–1926), son of the latter, professor of law in the Imperial Novorossiya University and professor in the Sofia University after immigrated to Bulgaria after the Russian Civil War.

== Properties ==
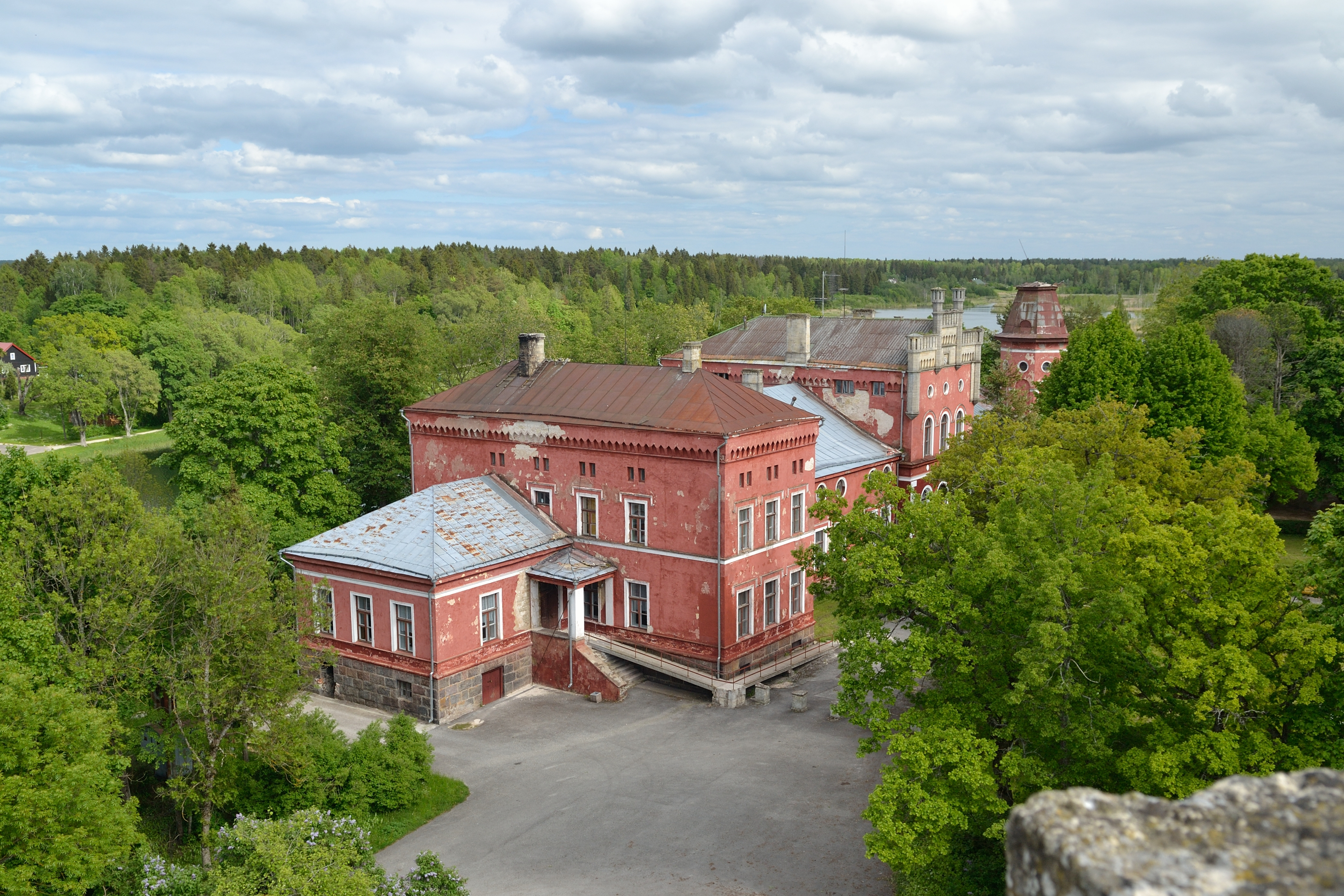
The Borckholm Manor, 2012.

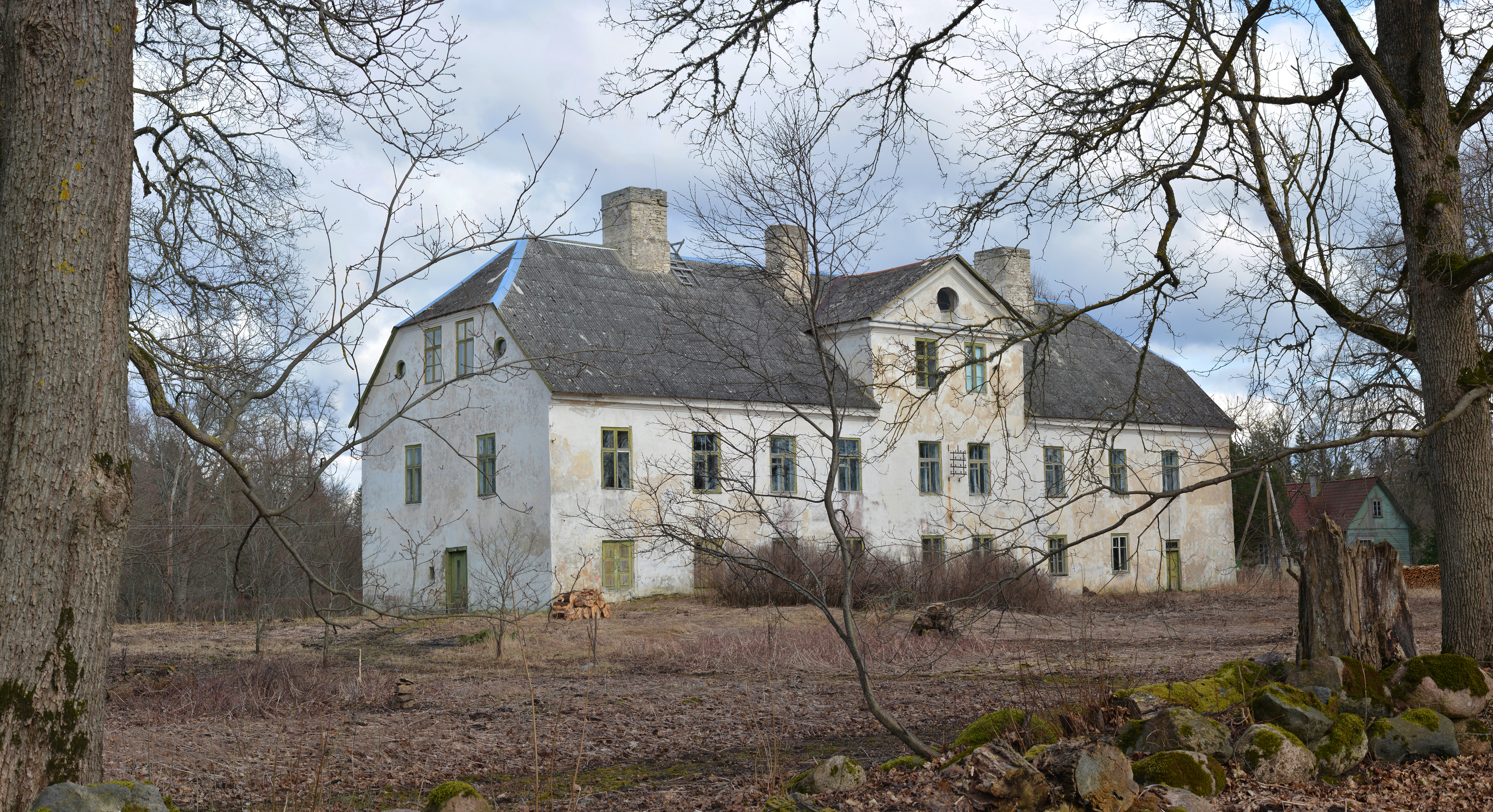
The Tuttomäggi Manor, 2015.

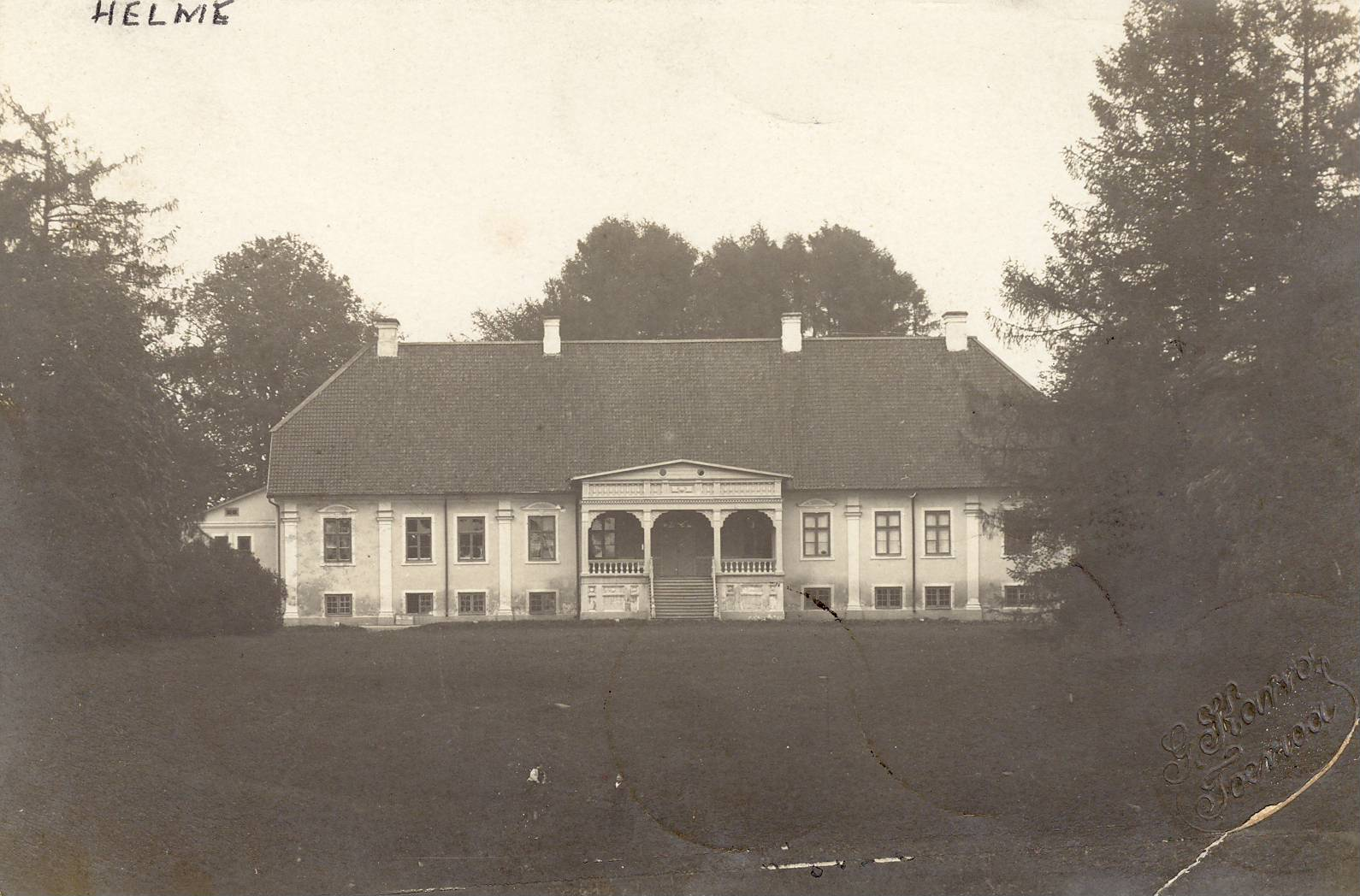
The Helmet Manor, c. late-19th to early-20th century.

The Rennenkampffs were huge landowners. In the 18th century, they possessed about 20 estates with a total 94,000 hectares, the largest being the Alt-Kalzenau Manor, which covered a total of 15,000 hectares. In the 19th century at their peak, the Rennenkampffs possessed 33 estates with the total of 97,000 hectares, the Borckholm Manor being the largest covered about 12,000 hectares. In the early 20th century, the Rennenkampffs’ possessions and amount of land dramatically dropped. By the time of the Estonian Land Reform in 1919, they only possessed 44,000 hectares of land prior to its being confiscated.

=== In Estonia (Note: German names are listed on the left, while Estonian names are in blankets on the right) ===
- Kono Manor (Koonu)
- Kosch Manor (Päärdu)
- Finn Manor (Vinni)
- Selgs Manor (Selja)
- Konofer Manor (Konuvere)
- Pantifer Manor (Pandivere)
- Borckholm Manor (Porkuni)
- Tammik Manor (Tammiku)
- Wack Manor (Vao)
- Wesenberg Manor (Rakvere)
- Jerwajöggi Manor (Järvajõe)
- Tuttomäggi Manor (Tuudi)
- Sastama Manor (Saastna)
- Layküll Manor (Laiküla)
- Fersenau Manor (Mõraste)
- Paenküll Manor (Paeküla)
- Raeküll Manor (Raeküla)
- Moisama Manor (Mõisamaa)
- Groß-Ruhde Manor (Suure-Rõude)

=== In Livonia ===
- Helmet Manor (Helme)
- Palloper Manor (Palupera)
- Duckershof Manor (Kammeri)
- Fölck Manor (Laatre)
- Loeweküll Manor (Leevi)
- Neu- and Alt-Pigast Manors (Soodla and Piigaste)
- Karstemois Manor with side manor Bellevue (Karst and Mügra)
- Kokenberg Manor (et: Brenti and lv: Brentu)
- Neu-Kasthof Manor (Vastse-Kuuste)
- Warbus Manor (Varbuse)
- Jexi Manor with side manor Pallawa (Jõksi)
- Heiligensee Manor (Pühajärve)
- Kiddijerw Manor (Kiidjärve)
- Walguta Manor (Valguta)
- Alt- and Neu-Kalzenau Manors (et and lv: Jaunkalsnava)
- Groß- and Neu-Kamby Manors with side manor Maydellshof (Kambja and Maidla)
- Uelzen Manor (Vaabina)
- Felix Manor (Veelikse)
- Waimastfer Manor with side manor Tirmast (Vaimastvere and Tirma)
- Moisaküll Manor (Mõisaküla)
- Kürbelshof Manor (et: Kürble and et: Ķirbēni)

=== Ösel ===
- Laimjall Manor (Laimjala)
- Jöör Manor (Jööri)

== Coat of arms ==
The coat of arms of the Edle Rennenkampff family of 1728 according to the Genealogical Handbook of the Baltic Knighthoods, Part Estonia by Baron Otto Magnus von Stackelberg:

Divided by green and red, growing upward from the division and facing each other: on the right a gold lion with both hands holding swords straight ahead, on the left a silver-colored griffin holding a broad cut short sword, below single, two facing crowned helmets. Crest: lion on the right, griffin on the left. Mantling: Green and silver.

== Sources ==
- Stackelberg, Otto Magnus (1930). "Genealogische Handbuch der baltischen Ritterschaften, Teil Estland, Band I, seite 192–212 (Genealogical Handbook of the Baltic Knighthood, Part Estonia, Band III, page 192-212)". personen.digitale-sammlungen.de. Starke Verlag, Görlitz.
- Transehe-Roseneck, Astaf (1929). "Genealogische Handbuch der baltischen Ritterschaften, Teil Livland, Band II, seite 776–785 (Genealogical Handbook of the Baltic Knighthoods, Part Livonia, Band II, page 776-785)". personen.digitale-sammlungen.de. Starke Verlag, Görlitz.
- Stavenhagen, Oskar (1930). "Genealogische Handbuch der baltischen Ritterschaften, Teil Kurland, Band II, seite 689–695 (Genealogical Handbook of the Baltic Knighthoods, Part Courland, Band II, page 776-785)". personen.digitale-sammlungen.de. Starke Verlag, Görlitz.
- Klingspor, Carl Arvid (1882). "Baltisches Wappenbuch Wappen sämmtlicher, den Ritterschaften von Livland, Estland, Kurland und Oesel zugehörigen Adelsgeschlechter, seite 95 und 196 (The coat of arms of the coat of arms is the coat of arms belonging to the knighthoods of Livonia, Estonia, Courland and Oesel, page 95 and 196)". personen.digitale-sammlungen.de. Stockholm.
- Essen, Nicolai (1935). "Genealogisches Handbuch der Oeselschen Ritterschaft, seite 308–314 (Genealogical Handbook of the Oesel Knighthoods, page 308-314)". personen.digitale-sammlungen.de. Tartu.
- "Deutschbaltisches Biographisches Lexikon, seite 619–622 (Baltic German Biographical Dictionary, page 619-622)". bbld.de. Buchhandlung v. Hirschheydt, Wedemark. 1998.
