= Paul Andreas von Rennenkampff =

Russian general (1790–1857)

Edler Paul Andreas von Rennenkampff
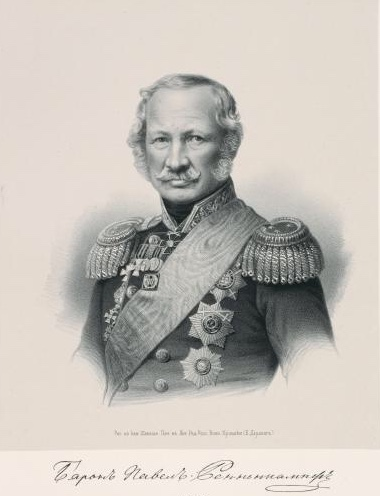
- Lieutenant-General Paul Andreas Edler von Rennenkampff, c. 1855.
- Born: 9 March [O.S. 26 February] 1790; Helmet Manor, Helmet, Kreis Fellin, Governorate of Livonia, Russian Empire (in present-day Helme, Valga County, Estonia)
- Died: 8 December [O.S. 26 November] 1857 or 26 December [O.S. 14] 1857 (aged 67); St. Petersburg, Russian Empire
- Burial place: Volkovo Lutheran Cemetery
- Children: 1 child (debated)
- Military career
- Allegiance: Russian Empire
- Branch: Imperial Russian Army
- Service years: 1812-1846; 1849-1857
- Rank: Lieutenant-General
- Commands: 1st Infantry Division; 19th Infantry Division
- Conflicts: Napoleonic Wars; Russian Campaign; Battle of Borodino; Battle of Bautzen; War of the Sixth Coalition; Battle of Katzbach; Battle of Leipzig; Battle of Paris; Russo-Persian War; Russo-Turkish War; Battle of Akhaltsikhe; South Ossetian Expedition of 1830; November Uprising; Hungarian Revolution of 1848; Crimean War; Siege of Sevastopol

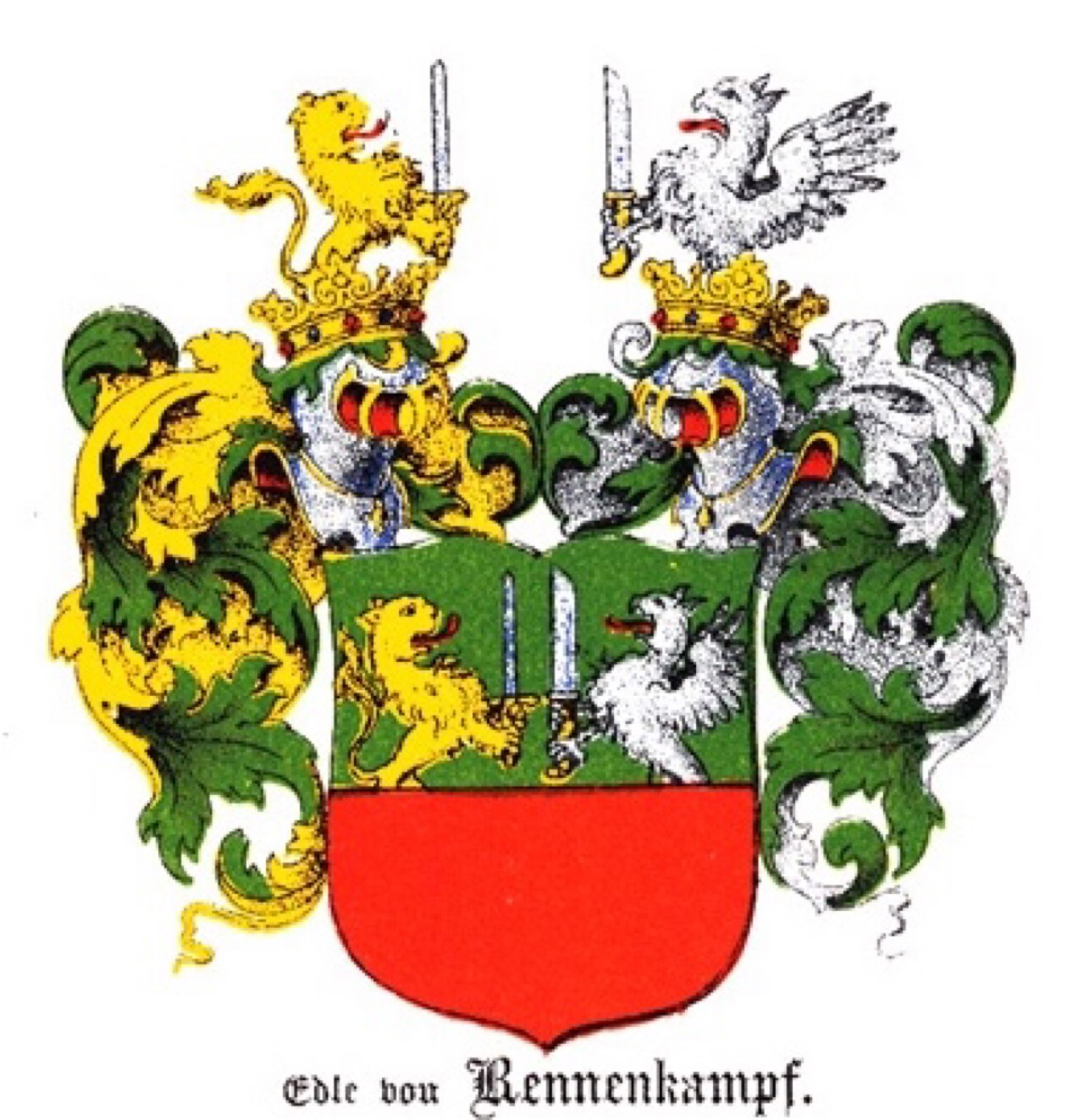
Coat of arms of the Rennenkampff family of 1728, in the Baltic Coat of arms book by Carl Arvid von Klingspor in 1882.

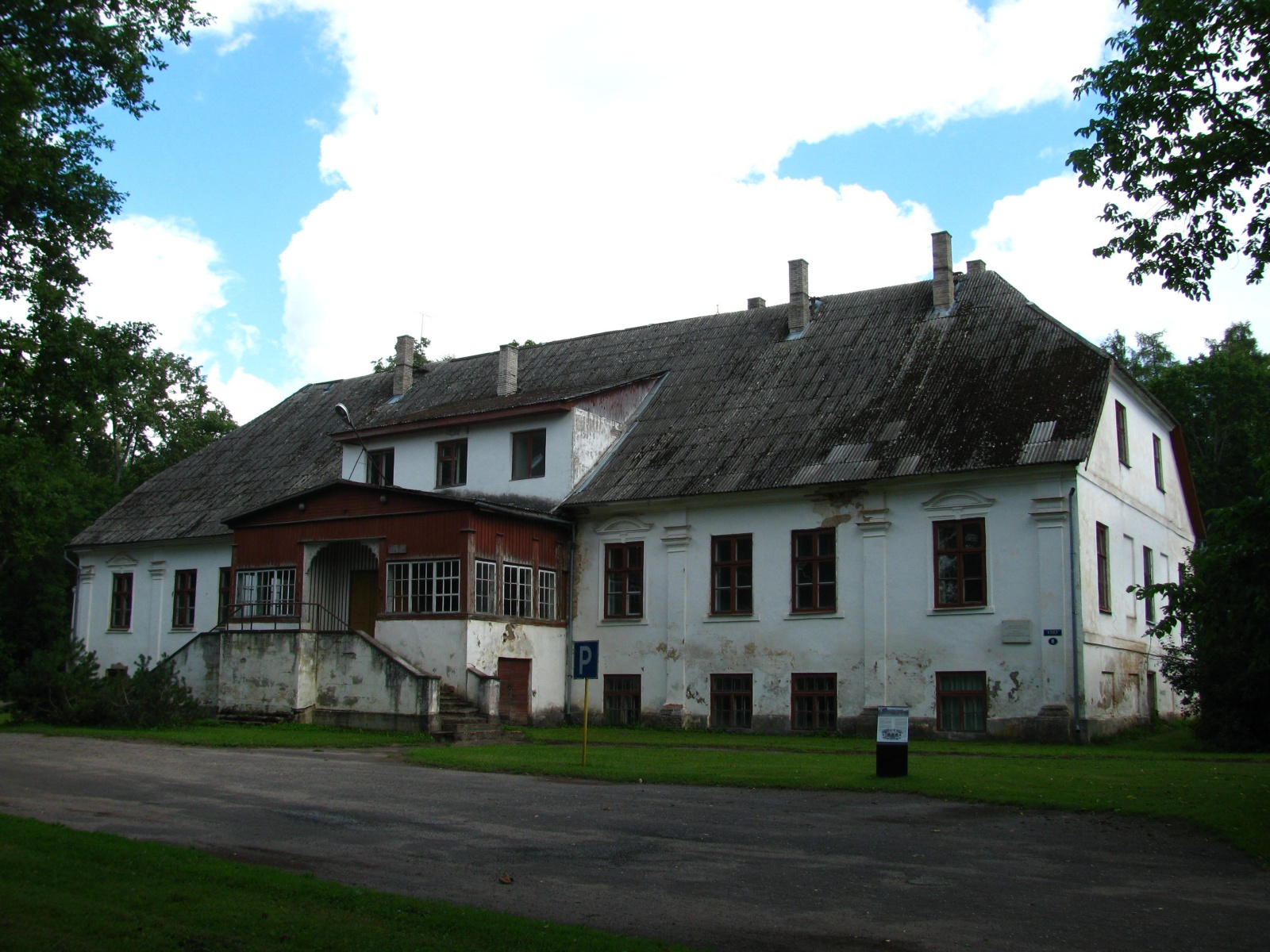
The Helme Manor (German: Schloss Helmet) at Helme, Estonia, where Rennenkampff was born, c. 2012.

Paul Andreas Edler von Rennenkampff (Note: The spelling of his last name varies in different works between Rennenkampff, Rennenkampf, Remenkampe and Remmenkamp.) (Russian: Па́вел Я́ковлевич Ренненка́мпф, tr. Pável Yákovlevich Rennenkámpf; 9 March [O.S. 26 February] 1790 – 8 December [O.S. 26 November] 1857 or 26 December [O.S. 14] 1857) was a Baltic German nobleman, military commander and Statesman in the service of the Imperial Russian Army. Rennenkampff was noted for his distinguished roles during the Suppression of the South Ossetians in 1830 and the Crimean War, especially during the Siege of Sevastopol.

== Biography ==
=== Origin ===
Paul Andreas Edler von Rennenkampff was born on 9 March [O.S. 26 February] 1790 in the Helme Manor (German: Schloss Helmet) at Helmet in the Governorate of Livonia (present-day Helme, Estonia), to Jakob Johann von Rennenkampff and Elizabeth Dorothea von Anrep. The Rennenkampffs was of Westphalian origin and was originated in Osnabrück. He was the great-uncle of the famed World War I general Paul von Rennenkampf.

=== Family ===
As part of a wealthy noble family, Rennenkampff had a lot of siblings, including his older brothers Karl Jakob Alexander von Rennenkampff (1783-1854), a writer, captain and chamberlain in Holstein-Oldenburg, and Gustav Reinhold Georg (1784-1869), an army officer in Saxe-Coburg-Saalfeld, politician and economist. In 1832, Rennenkampff married Anna Maria von Vegesack (1808-1881), they had one child, Johann Paul Alexander von Rennenkampff (1836-1838). Although some sources claimed that Rennenkampff had another child named Nikolaus Jakob Otto von Rennenkampff, but that was never confirmed. But either way, even if both children existed, neither of them survived through childhood.

== Honours and awards ==
=== Domestic ===
- Order of St. Anna, 4th class (1813)
- Golden sword with the inscription "For Bravery"
- Order of St. Anna, 1st class with imperial crown (1.1.1831, imperial crown on (14.10.1831)
- Order of St. George, 4th class "For 25 years of service" (1831)
- Order of St. Vladimir, 2nd class (14.3.1842)
- Order of the White Eagle with swords (1855)

=== Foreign ===
- Kingdom of Prussia:
  - Pour le Mérite (1814)
  - Order of the Red Eagle, 2nd class with a star (1835)
- French Third Republic:
  - Legion of Honour, Knight class (1814)
- Qajar dynasty:
  - Order of the Lion and the Sun, 1st class (1828)
- Austrian Empire:
  - Order of the Iron Crown, 1st class (1835)
- Kingdom of Denmark:
  - Order of Dannebrog, Grand Commander class (1836)
