= Karl Friedrich von Rennenkampff =

Russian general (1788–1848)

Edler Karl Friedrich von Rennenkampff
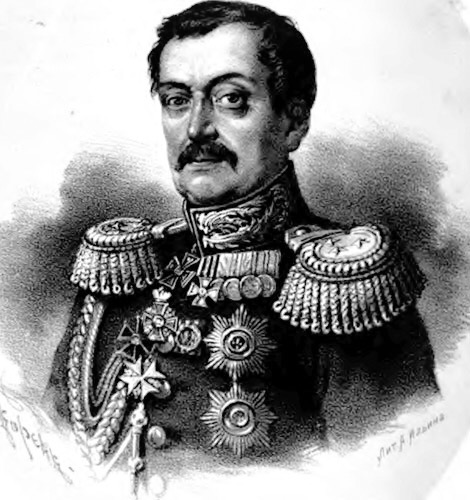
- Lieutenant-General Karl Friedrich von Rennenkampff, c. 1844-1848.
- Born: 27 November [O.S. 16] 1788; Riga, Governorate of Livonia, Russian Empire
- Died: 5 September [O.S. 25 August] 1848; St. Petersburg, Russian Empire
- Burial place: Volkovo Lutheran Cemetery
- Children: 16 children
- Military career
- Allegiance: Russian Empire
- Branch: Imperial Russian Army
- Service years: 1809-1848
- Rank: Lieutenant-General
- Conflicts: Napoleonic Wars: Patriotic War of 1812; Battle of Kobrin; War of the Sixth Coalition; Battle of Bautzen; Battle of Leipzig; Battle of Katzbach; Russo-Turkish War; January Uprising

Karl Friedrich Edler von Rennenkampff (Russian: Карл-Фри́дрих Па́влович Ренненка́мпф, Karl-Fridrikh Pavlovich Rennenkampf; 27 November [O.S. 16] 1788 – 5 September [O.S. 25 August] 1848) was a Baltic German statesman and general of the Imperial Russian Army. Like many other soldiers at the time, Rennenkampff participated in the Russian Campaign in 1812 against Napoleon, distinguishing him during the war including the Bautzen, along his cousin Paul, who also participated in the Battle of Bautzen. He also served as the vice-director of the Imperial Military Academy form 1843 until his death in 1848. He was the great-uncle of the famous World War I general Paul von Rennenkampf.

== Sources ==
- Genealogical Handbook of the Baltic Knighthoods Part 1, 2: Livonia, Lfg. 9-15. Görlitz (1929)
- Welding, Olaf. Baltic German Biographical Dictionary 1710-1960. (1970), from the Baltic Biographical Dictionary Digital
