= Viktor Kurnatovsky =

Victor Konstantinovich Kurnatovsky
- Виктор Константинович Курнатовский
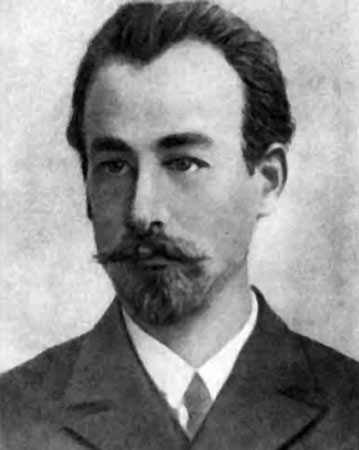
- Born: June 28, 1868; Riga, Russian Empire
- Died: September 19, 1912 (aged 44); Paris, France

Victor Konstantinovich Kurnatovsky (Ru: Виктор Константинович Курнатовский) (28 June 1868 – 19 September 1912) was one of the first Russian Marxist revolutionaries, who spent more than half his life in prison or exile.

== Biography ==
Kurnatovsky was born in Riga, where his father was a doctor. As an 18-year student at St Petersburg University, he joined Narodnaya Volya (People's Will), for which he was expelled in 1887, and ordered to leave St Petersburg. In 1888, he enrolled in Moscow University. By that time he had renounced populism, and he organised a Marxist circle, one of Russia's first, for which he was expelled and exiled to Arkhangelsk province. In 1892, he emigrated to Switzerland and graduated in chemical engineering from Zurich Polytechnic, and made contact with the Emancipation of Labour group, led by Georgi Plekhanov

In 1897, he returned to Russia, but was arrested at the border and returned to exile in Siberia. There, he came to know Lenin and his circle. Kurnatovsky became a representative of the Iskra-group in the Caucasus. In 1900, the Tiflis Committee of the Russian Social-Democratic Labour Party was established upon his initiative. He was in charge of the May-Day demonstrations in Tiflis, but was arrested on 22 March 1901 and spent two years in prison after which he was deported to Yakut Region. On his escape from Yakutsk he participated in the armed resistance of the exiles against the authorities, for which he was sentenced to twelve years' hard labour.

After being amnestied, in the 1905 revolution he became the chairman of the Soviet of Workers', Soldiers' and Cossacks' Deputies in Chita, often referred to as the Chita Republic.

After the events of the Chita Republic he was sentenced to death. He was carried in the train of General Rennenkampf and had to witness the execution of workers at every railway station. His sentence was later commuted to exile for life. In 1906 he managed to escape from Nerchinsk to Japan, and from Japan to Australia. In 1910 he arrived in Paris where he again met with Krupskaya and Lenin.

Kurnatovsky died September 19, 1912 in Paris at the age of 44.
