= Chita Republic =

1905–06 revolutionary republic in Russia

Chita Republic Читинская республика
- 1905–1906
- Location of Transbaikal Oblast in Russia
- Capital: Chita
- Common languages: Russian
- Government: Soviet republic
- Chairman of the Council of Workers' Militias
  - 1905–1906: Anton Kostiushko-Voliuzhanich
- Legislature: Soviet of Soldiers' and Cossacks' Deputies
- Historical era: 1905 Russian Revolution
  - Established: 22 November 1905
  - Proclaimed: 21 December 1905
  - Disestablished: 22 January 1906
- Currency: Ruble
Preceded by	Succeeded by
Russian Empire	Russian Empire
- Today part of: Russia

The Chita Republic (Russian: Читинская республика) was a short-lived soviet republic based in Chita from the end of 1905 to the beginning of 1906. Chita, a city in eastern Siberia, Russia, and a place of exile for early revolutionaries and combatants of the Russo-Japanese War, was a center for worker unrest in the early 1900s. During the Russian Revolution of 1905 armed revolutionaries under the leadership of the RSDLP headed by Viktor Kurnatovsky, Anton Kostiushko-Voliuzhanich, and Ivan Babushkin organized themselves into a "Soviet of Soldiers' and Cossacks' Deputies" and took control over the city, declaring the Chita Republic in December 1905.

== Background ==
The Transbaikal region on the eve of the 1905 Russian Revolution was a hotbed for workers' unrest. Although Siberian wages were high (on average, 30% higher than wages in European Russia), there was much inflation in the region. Food prices jumped in the decade before the revolution by 40-50%, but incomes only rose by half that. Poor harvests in 1901 and 1902 led to up to 200% increases in prices for food. On the Trans-Siberian Railroad, the number of new workers coming in could not keep up with the increase in the number of people using the railway. There was little medical care for workers who had to work in the cold, and accidents were common due to the climate and the lack of workers. Thus, left-wing influence grew rapidly in the Transbaikal region. Chita, in particular, was more influenced by the Bolsheviks than by the Mensheviks. By 1904, serious unrest began caused by inflation from the Russo-Japanese War. The RSDLP started agitating against the war in various cities along the Trans-Siberian Railroad, with major strikes starting in January 1905.

== Revolution in Chita ==
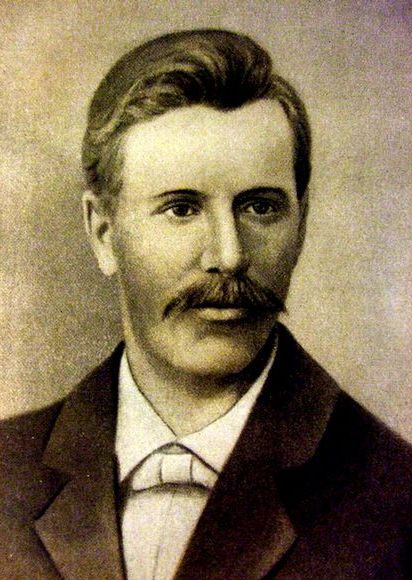
Ivan Vasilievich Babushkin, a leader of the Chita Republic

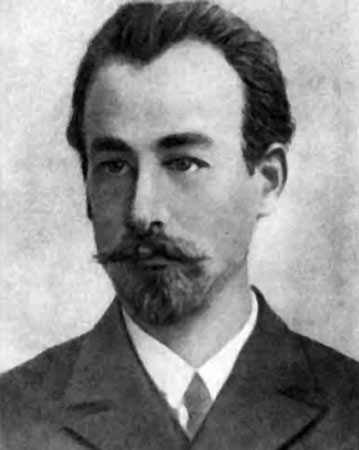
Viktor Kurnatovsky, leader of the Soviet of Soldiers' and Cossacks' Deputies

Initially, railway workers in Chita reacted to Bloody Sunday with a one-day walkout. In late January, there was a three-day strike by the railway workers over late wages. In July, agitation by the RSDLP led to a group of 20 craftsmen presenting demands to local authorities. Negotiations devolved into strikes from July 25 and 26. Workshops were closed on the 27th, and on the 28th, workers came up with 33 new demands, including a demand for an eight-hour work day. It is noted that speeches by local Social-Democratic leaders received up to 2,000 listeners from the striking workers. These strikes spread along the Trans-Siberian Railway to cities like Irkutsk, Zima and Verkhneudinsk. In September, Chita Social Democrats convened a congress of Transbaikal activists, with 18 delegates representing railway workers from the region, as well as from shop and depot workers in Chita, and 5 RSDLP representatives. In the wake of the general strike of October 1905, Transbaikal railway telegraph employees voiced their demands, including radical land reform. Later, Chita railway engineers tried to create a national congress of workers based on their local "union of engineers". Chita organizers built a separate union for shop and depot workers. By December, the Chita Republic encompassed most of the major stations, and in January 3–6, 1906, 2,500 workers were organized under the local union at twelve stations and were represented by 37 representatives.

On November 16, 1905, around 4,000 workers rallied under the RSDLP to create a republic fighting against the autocracy of the Russian government. Anton Kostiushko-Voliuzhanich headed the "Soviet of Soldiers' and Cossacks' Deputies" on 22 November. Railway workers proclaimed an eight-hour workday. To prevent fighting along the railway, the revolutionaries formed the "Joint Committee of Railway Workers and Service Personnel". A railway congress was called in mid-December in Irkutsk, resolving on revolutionary self-government in Chita (but not for the takeover of the Trans-Siberian Railway). On December 18, a mass rally called for the convening of the Congress of Delegates of Transbaikalia, an organization comprising the Chita Municipal Duma and the representatives from local unions and political parties. On December 21, the congress, chaired by mayor of Chita Sergei Kirillovich Sheshmintev, agreed on self-government for the city of Chita with universal elections. Sanctioned by Governor-General Kholshchelvnikov, the Chita Post and Telegraph Office came under the jurisdiction of an elected committee.

The "Joint Committee of Railway Workers and Service Personnel" extended the Chita Republic's power through much of the surrounding Transbaikal region. Workers under it exercised heavy control over the local railroads. The local military governor-general, I. V. Kholshchelvnikov, complied with the demands of the revolutionaries, and so was not removed. He was later tried through court-martial. The workers and soldiers of Chita who controlled the railroads were so well-armed, the local Siberian units passing through the city did not wish to fight them.

== Suppression ==
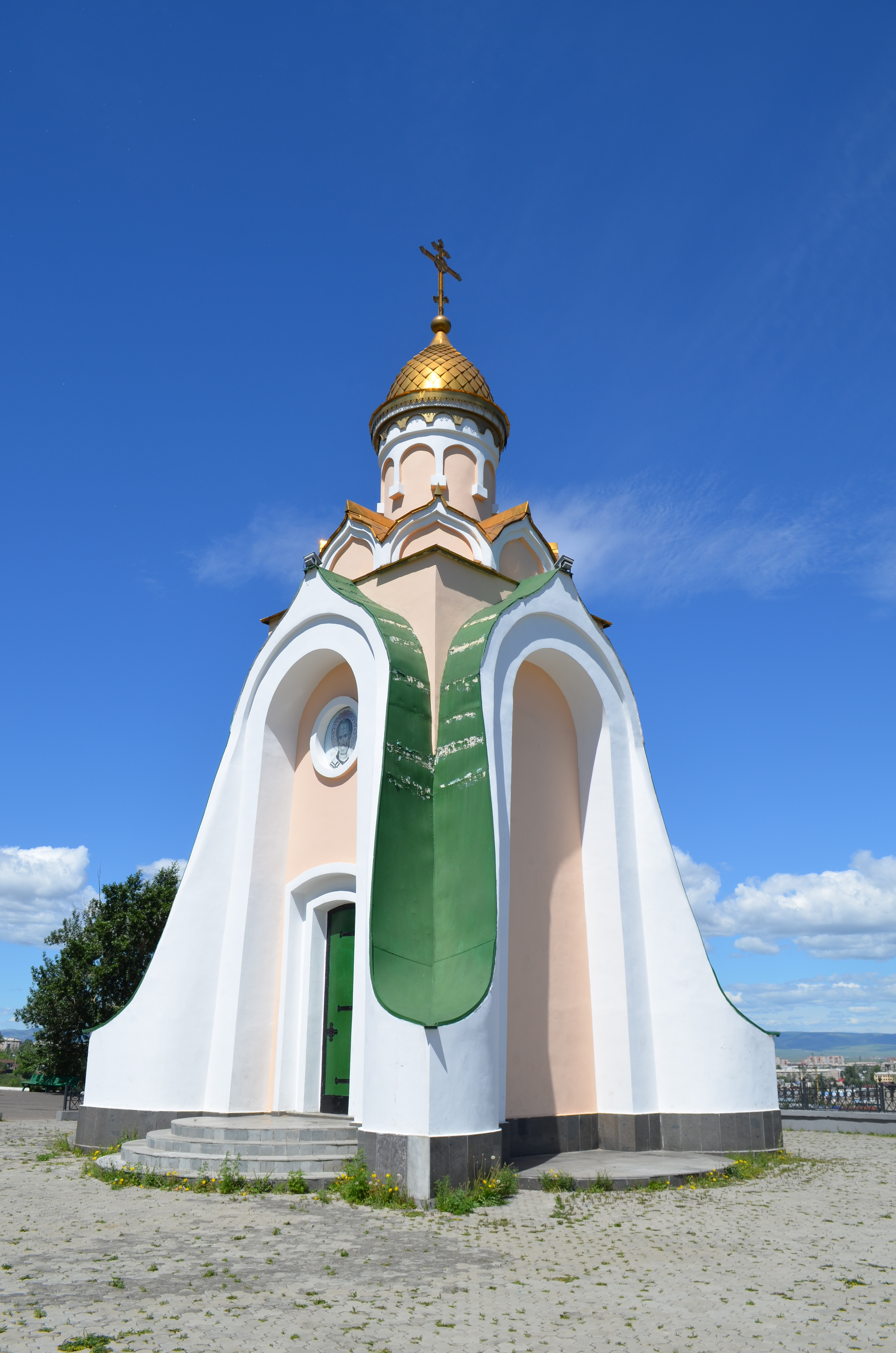
The chapel where leaders of the Chita Republic were shot

The leaders of the republic tried to organize and establish administration in the city and its outskirts, and the new periodical Zabaykalsky Rabochy was issued in Chita on December 7, 1905, but the republic was fated to fail after the suppression of the uprisings in Moscow and Saint Petersburg. Troops loyal to the regime, led by Paul von Rennenkampf and general Meller-Zakomelsky, were sent to suppress the rebellious territory; it was quickly subjugated and Chita was occupied by government troops on 22 January 1906.

"At the beginning of 1906 Kurnatovsky was again arrested and sentenced to death. General Rennenkampf, the pacifier of Siberia, carried the condemned man in his train so that he might witness with his own eyes the executions of workers at every railway station."

The six leaders of the Chita Republic were shot on the slope of Titovsky sopka. Kurnatovsky's death sentence was later commuted to life-long exile to Siberia. Military courts gave death sentences to many others, as well as twenty-six soldiers. In the memory of the leaders of the Chita Republic, several central streets of Chita were named after them (Babushkina street, Kurnatovsky street, etc.).
