= Konuvere =

Village in Estonia

- Village
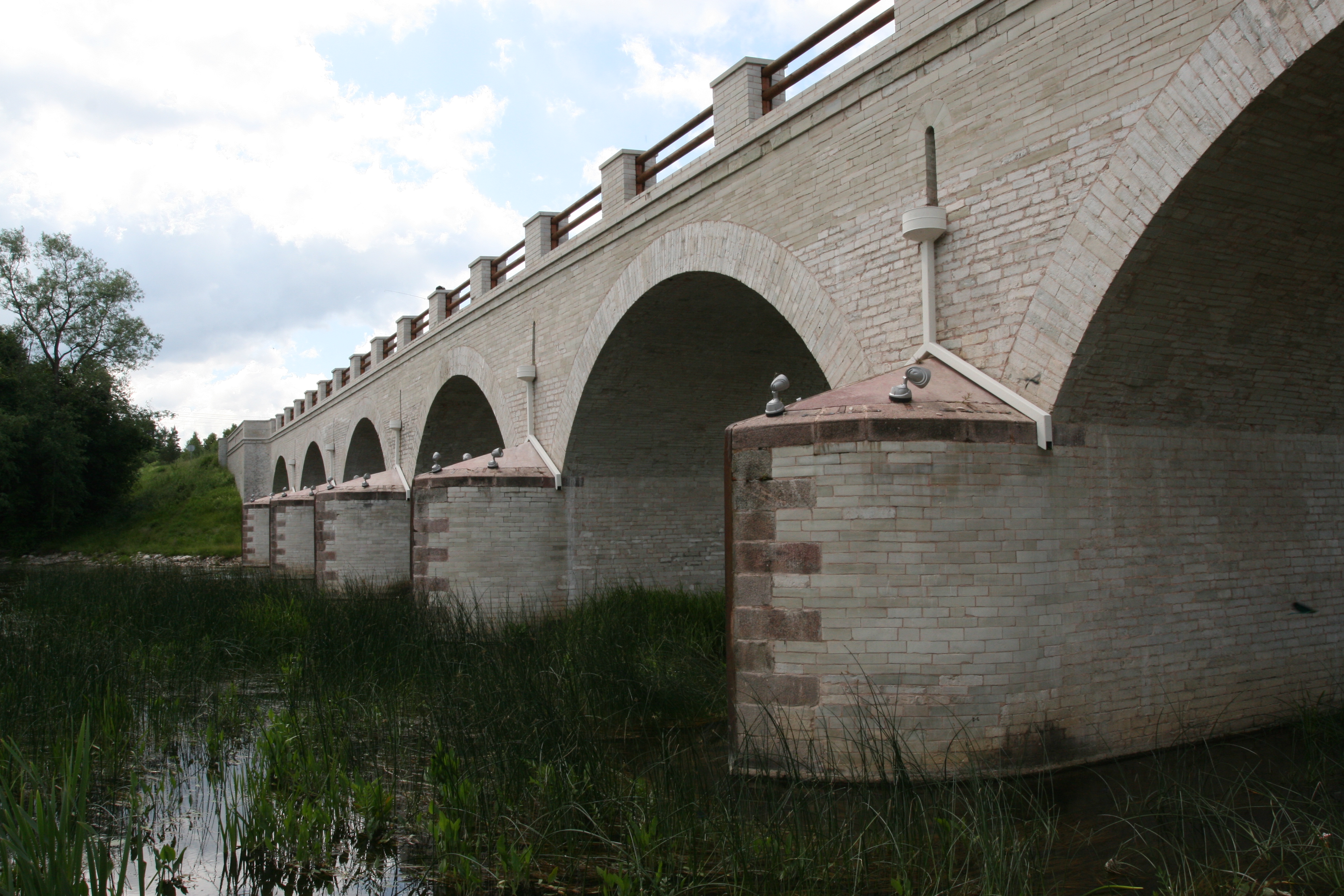
- Konuvere bridge (built 1861)

- Location in Estonia
- Coordinates: 58°48′37″N 24°22′49″E
- Country: Estonia
- County: Rapla County
- Parish: Märjamaa Parish
- Time zone: UTC+2 (EET)
  - Summer (DST): UTC+3 (EEST)

Konuvere (German: Konofer) is a village in Märjamaa Parish, Rapla County in western Estonia, on the north side of the Konuvere River.

Baltic German general Paul von Rennenkampf (1854–1918) was born in Konuvere Manor, note for heroic role in the Boxer Rebellion, and his role during the Russo-Japanese War and World War I.

Konuvere is located 58.809501° north of the equator and 24.413043° east of the prime meridian. It is also located 27 m (89 ft) above sea level.

== Konuvere hill fort ==
On a ridge between Konuvere and Vigala rivers lie the remains of a hill fort, probably settled in the 5th or 6th century. Excavations were carried out on the site in the 1970s. The site occupied a site approximately 2,000 square metres (22,000 sq ft) large. It seems to have been surrounded by a palisade, and within the remains of houses and stoves have been found. The archaeologists also found several items, mostly from the 10th to 11th centuries, including a precious gilded bronze button of Scandinavian origin.
