= Jööri =

Village in Estonia

- Village
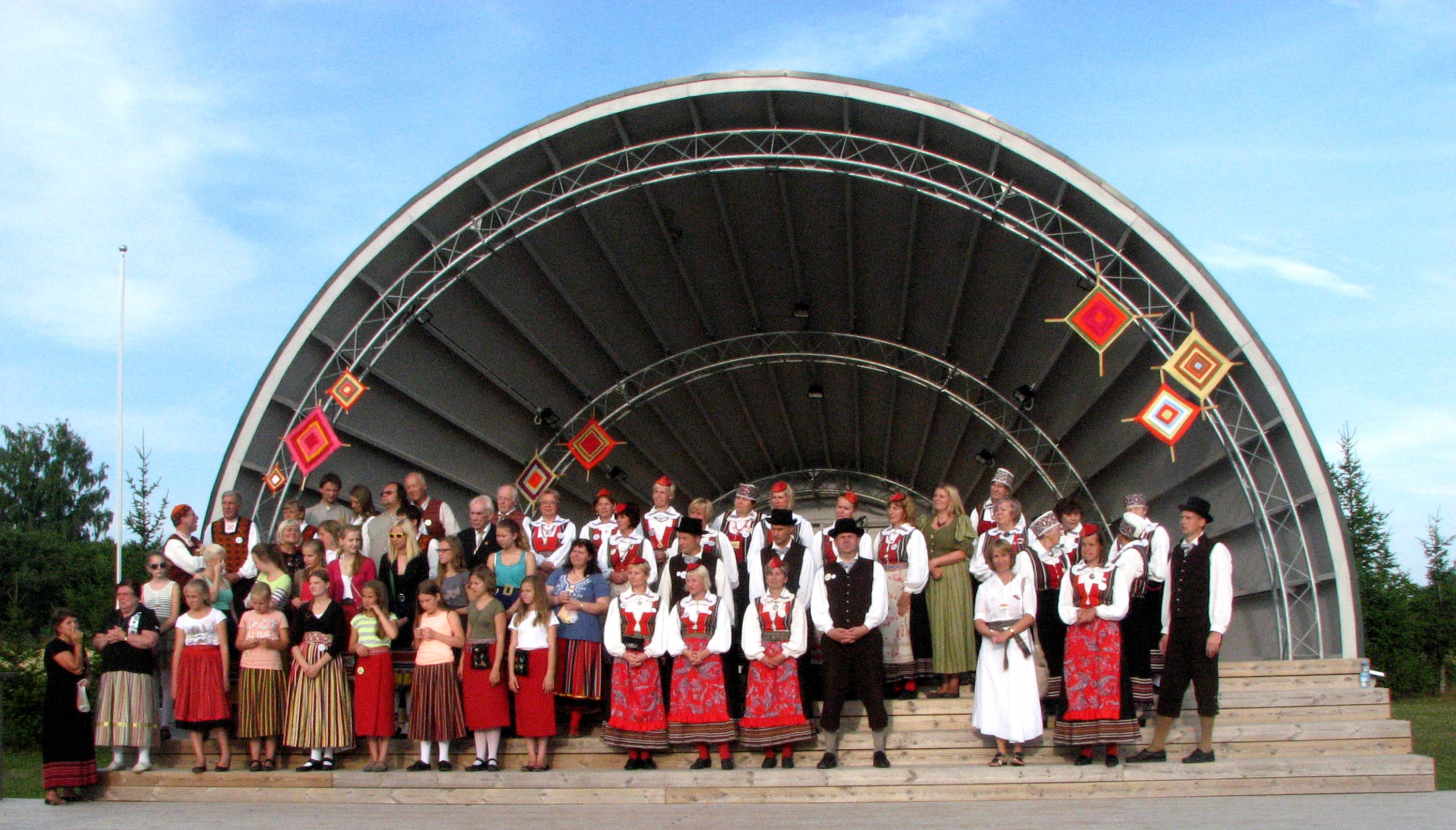
- Performers of the local festival "Jööri Folk" in 2013.

- Location in Estonia
- Coordinates: 58°25′56″N 22°46′13″E
- Country: Estonia
- County: Saare County
- Municipality: Saaremaa Parish

Population (2011 Census)
  - Total: 28

Jööri (German: Jöhr) is a village in Saaremaa Parish, Saare County, Estonia, on the island of Saaremaa. As of the 2011 census, the settlement's population was 28.

From 1977 to 1997, the village bore the name of Jõõri. There's a village museum that has been operating since 1998, and the local music festival Jööri Folk has been held annually since 2004.
