= Helme, Estonia =

Borough in Estonia

Helme
- Small borough
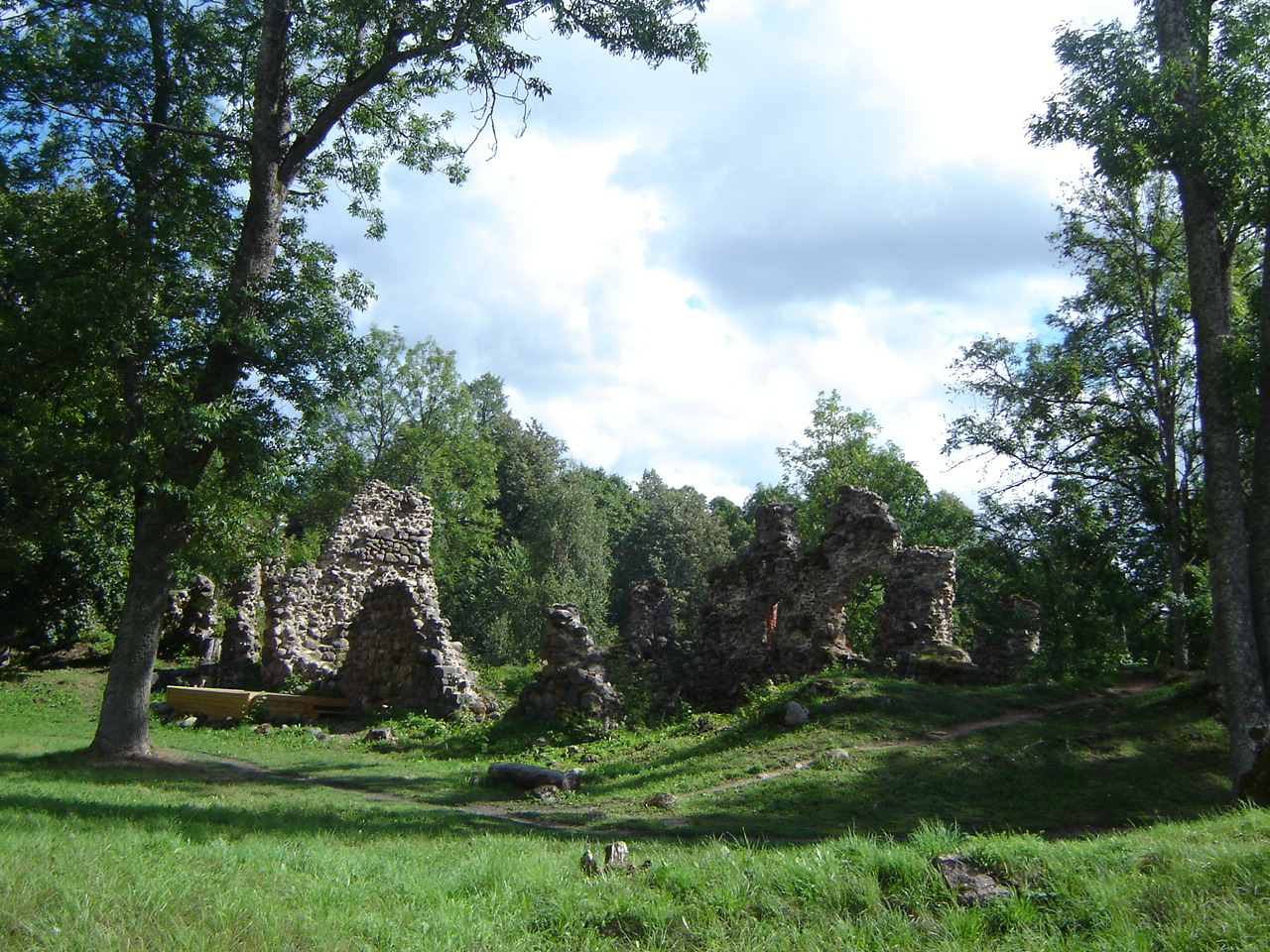
- Ruins of Helme castle.

- Location in Estonia
- Coordinates: 58°0′55″N 25°53′12″E
- Country: Estonia
- County: Valga County
- Municipality: Tõrva Parish
- First mentioned: 1329

Population (2011 Census)
  - Total: 167
- Website: www.helme.ee

Helme (German: Helmet) is a small borough (Estonian: alevik) in Tõrva Parish, Valga County, in southern Estonia. Prior to the 2017 reform of Estonian municipalities, it was located in Helme Parish. It is located only 2 km (1 mi) northwest of the town of Tõrva by the Valga–Pärnu road (nr. 6). At the 2011 Census, the settlement's population was 167.

== Helme castle ==
The settlement was first mentioned in the Livonian Chronicle of Henry in 1210. Helme church parish was first mentioned in 1329 during a Lithuanian raid. Most of the neighbouring land was granted as fiefsed in the 15th–16th centuries. The Livonian Order castle (Ordensburg Helmet) was probably built in the first half of the 14th century on a steep hill, on a site believed to have been used as a stronghold by Sackalians in Ancient Estonia. By its ground plan, the order castle was 120×60 m oval-shaped structure, surrounded by two moats. There was a borough beside the castle in the Middle Ages, it was mentioned until the 17th century. The castle was destroyed by the Swedes during the Russo-Swedish War in 1658. Nowadays only parts of the walls with high window holes have survived.

Helme is the birthplace of poet and dramatist Henrik Visnapuu (1890–1951) and sculptor Erna Viitol (1920–2001).

== Gallery ==
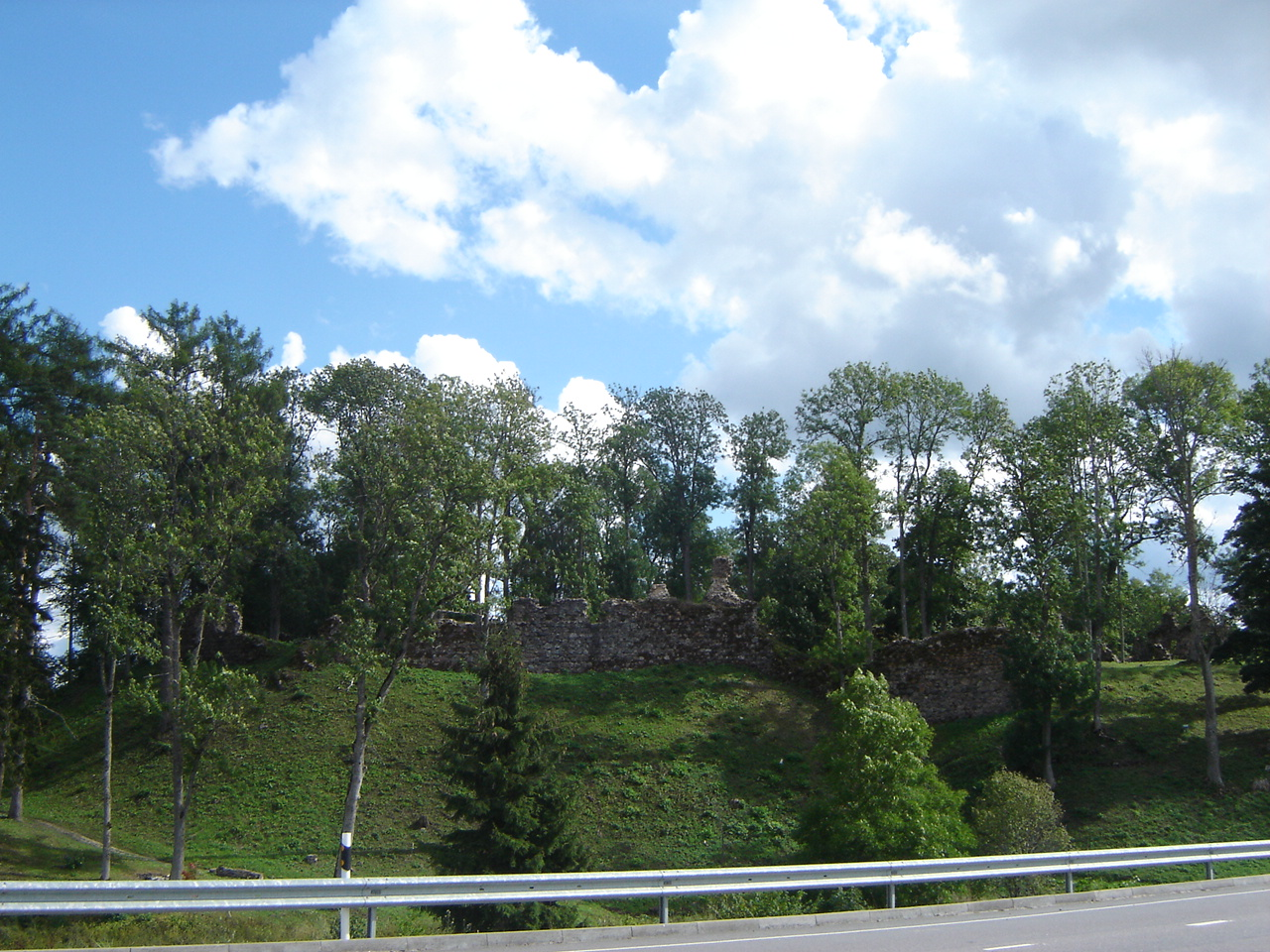
Ruins of Helme castle

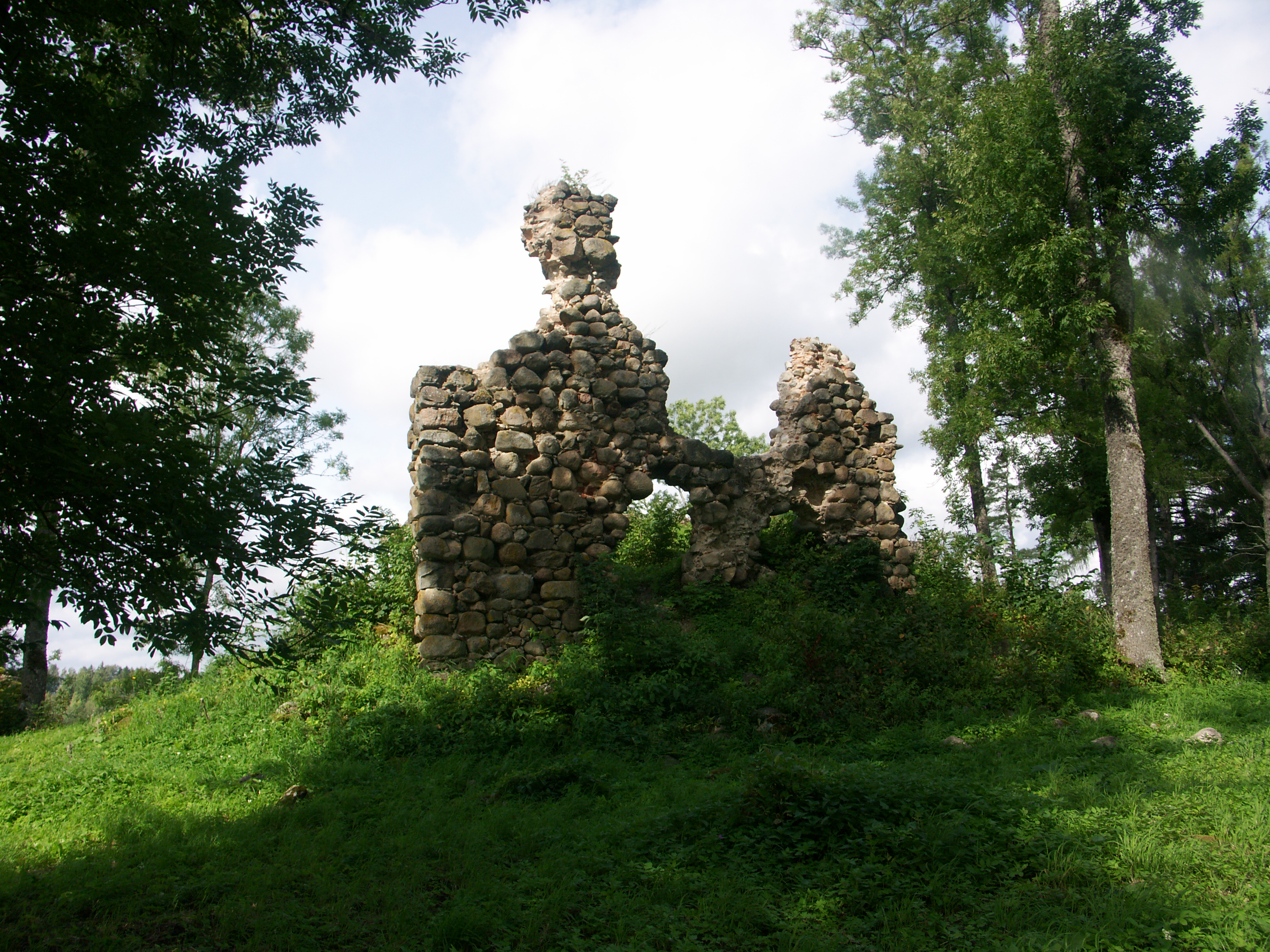

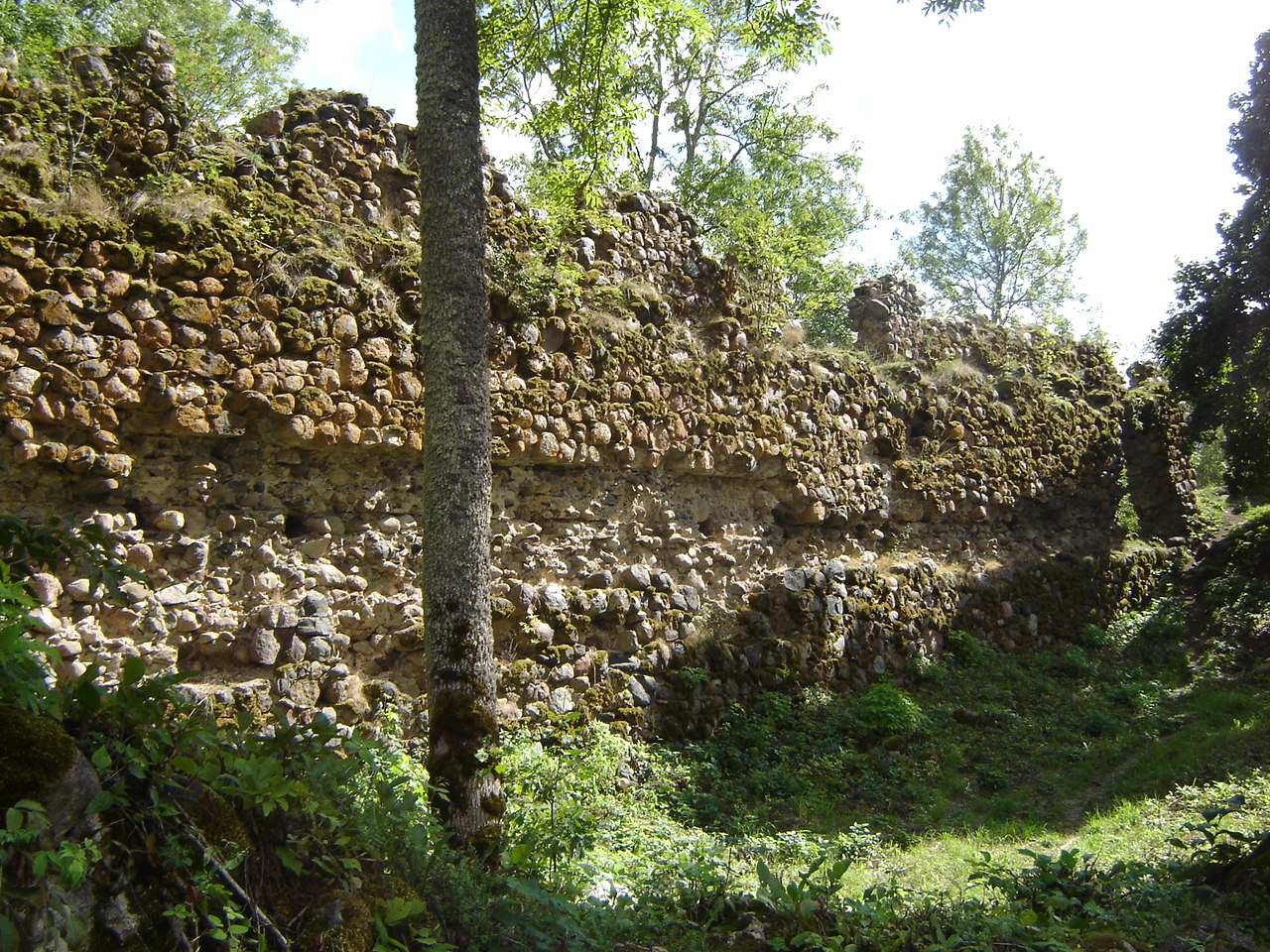

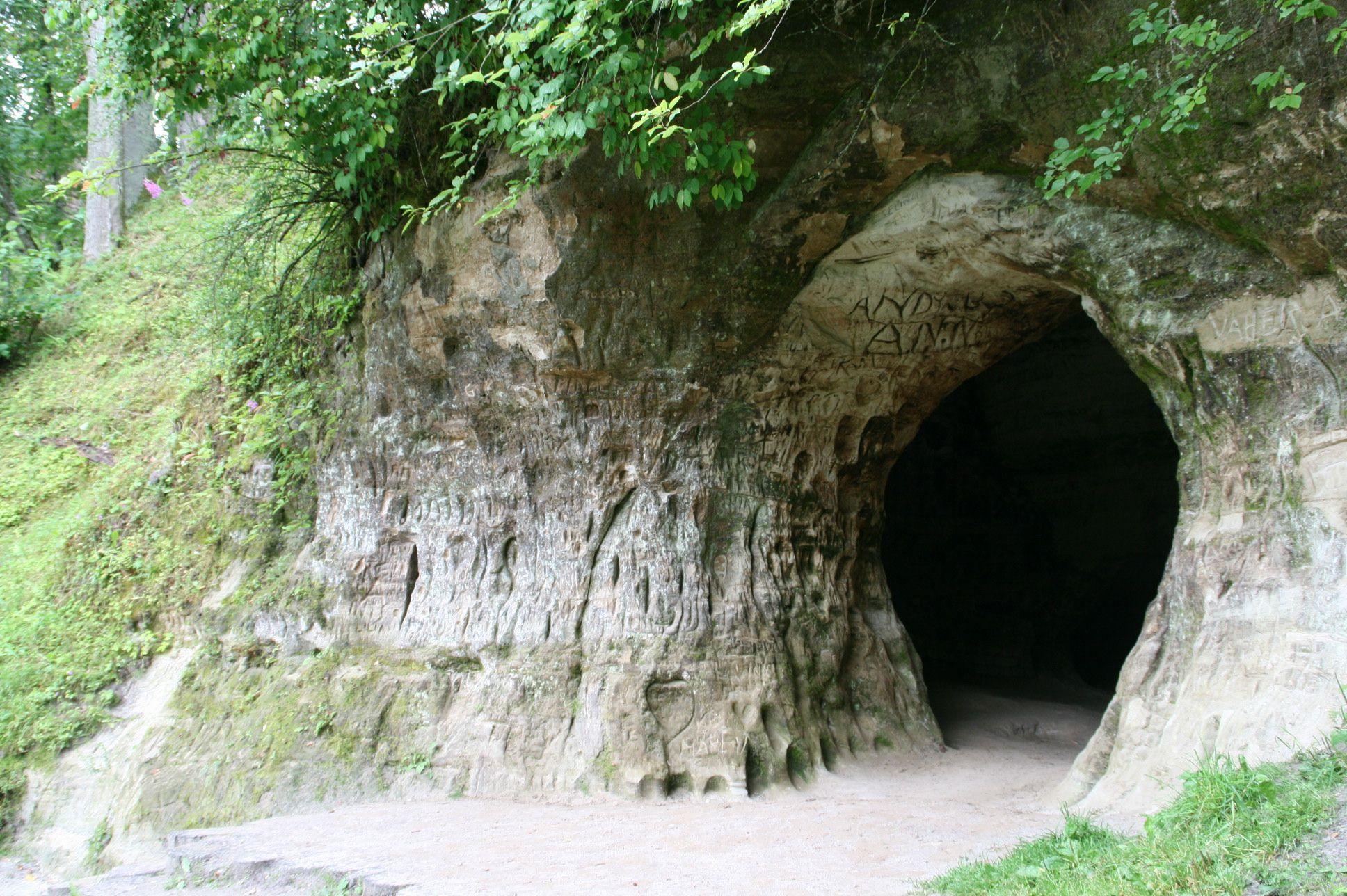
Entrance to Helme caves

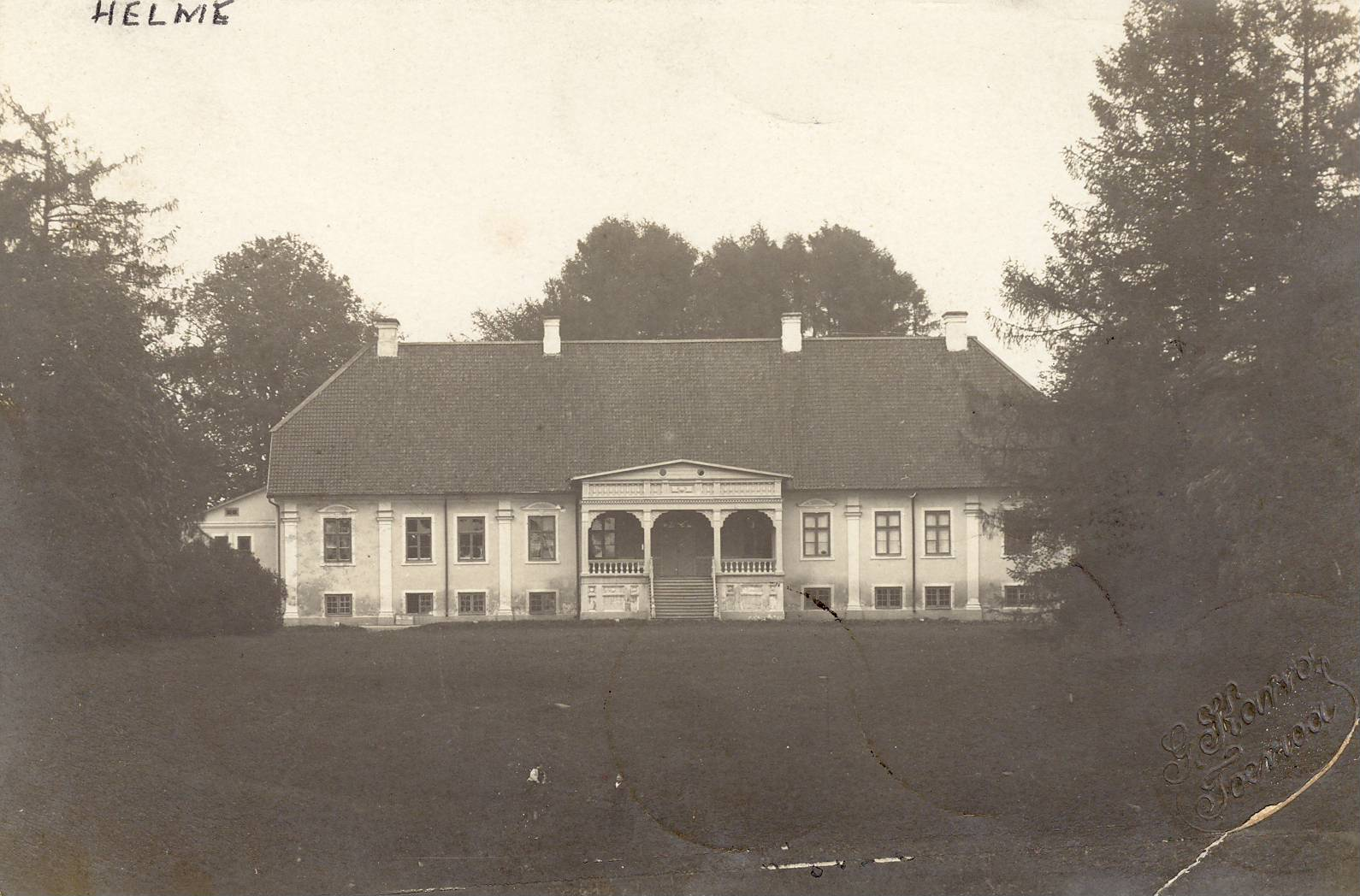
Helme Manor
