= Baltisches Wappenbuch =

1882 book of coat of arms of noble families

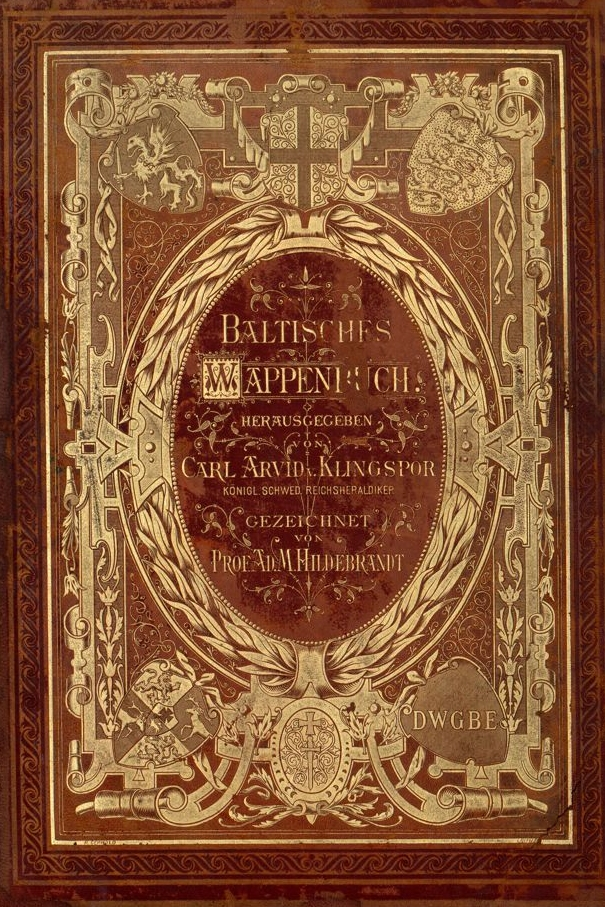
Cover of the book

Baltisches Wappenbuch (full name in German: Baltisches Wappenbuch: Wappen sämmtlicher, den Ritterschaften von Livland, Estland, Kurland und Oesel zugehöriger Adelsgeschlechten; in English: The Baltic Armorial: All coats of arms, belong to noble families related to the Livonian, Estonian, Curonian and Oesel Knighthoods), is a book detailing the coats of arms of Baltic-German noble families. The book was published in 1882 Stockholm by F. & G. Beijer. It was edited by Carl Arvid von Klingspor and illustrated by Adolf Matthias Hildebrandt.

In total, it consists of 798 coat of arms.
