= Carl Arvid von Klingspor =

Swedish heraldist (1829–1903)

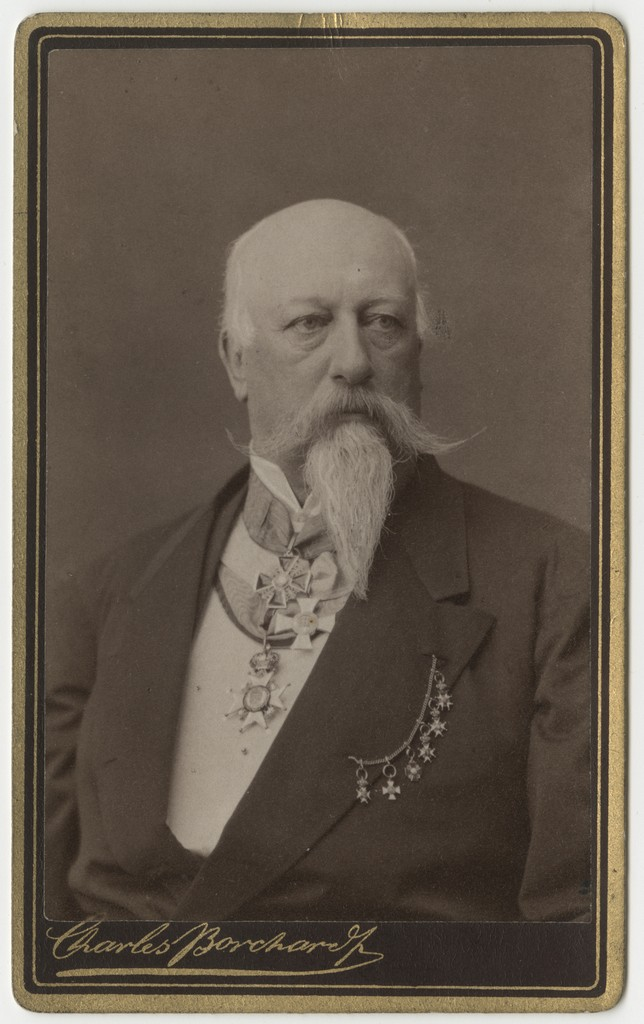
Carl Arvid von Klingspor

Carl Arvid von Klingspor (30 March 1829 – 15 June 1903) was a Swedish heraldist, genealogist and soldier.

Klingspor was born in Säby, Södermanland.

== Works ==
- "Svensk heraldik (1874; with Ernst Bernhard Schlegel)
- "Fortsättning av August Wilhelm Stiernstedts Sveriges ridderskaps och adels vapenbok" (1874–1879)
- "Den med sköldebref förlänade men ej å riddarhuset introducerade svenska adelns ättartaflor" (1875; with Ernst Bernhard Schlegel)
- "Upplands herregårdar" (1877–1881; with Ernst Bernhard Schlegel)
- “Genealogie des Germanischen Adelstitel” (1902)
- "Om Uplands adel i äldre tider" (1880)
- "Baltisches Wappenbuch" (1882)
- "Sveriges ridderskaps och adels vapenbok" (1890)
