= Edler =

Rank of nobility in Austria-Hungary and Germany

Edler (German: [ˈeːdlɐ]) was until 1919 the lowest rank of nobility in Austria-Hungary and Germany, just beneath a Ritter (hereditary knight), but above untitled nobles, who used only the nobiliary particle von before their surname. It was mostly given to civil servants and military officers, as well as those upon whom the lower rank of an Order had been conferred. The noun Edler comes from the adjective edel ("noble"), and translated literally means "noble [person]". In accordance with the rules of German grammar, the word can also appear as Edle, Edlem, or Edlen depending on case, gender, and number.

Heraldic crown of an Edler, with five visible pearls

Originally, from the Middle Ages, under the feudal system (in Europe and elsewhere), the nobility were generally those who held a fief, often in the form of heritable land worked by vassals. To preserve the feudal naming practice, even in cases where upper-ranking bureaucrats received patents of nobility for long service or merit, as in the 18th, 19th, and early 20th centuries (see noblesse de robe), the old practice of denoting a noble with a territorial designation was continued out of a sense of tradition.

Thus, landless nobles were created under the formula Edler von XYZ: either the surname or a place-name followed the German preposition von, which, in this context, was taken to denote nobility. Frequently, the nobiliary particle von (English 'of', or, more commonly, the French particule de noblesse 'de', meaning the same thing), was represented simply by the abbreviation v. to specify that it was being used to denote a member of the nobility, and not simply as the ordinary German-language preposition von.

An example of such a person's name and title is Josef Draginda, Edler v. Draginda. His wife would have been, for example, Johanna Draginda, Edle v. Draginda. Another example is the Austro-Hungarian general Viktor Weber Edler von Webenau, who signed the Armistice of Villa Giusti between Austria-Hungary and the Entente at the end of World War I.

The wife and the daughters of an Edler were titled Edle.

== Translations and Analogues ==
In Czech this title is translated and used as šlechtic z.

Similarly, finding an English analogue of rank is difficult due to the nature of the title. Usually Edler is translated as Esquire, whilst untitled nobility in the German speaking monarchies, i.e. simple "von + surname or location" was, and is still, considered an armigerous "gentleman" in the United Kingdom. Two cases in point are W. Shakespeare and his father. The Scottish feudal Baron (non-peerage) is no equivalent to the Edler, as is a title ranking below the Scottish knights, but above those of Lairds, Esquires and Gentlemen. Esquires in the United Kingdom are usually second and further sons of peers or peeresses in their own right, sons of knights, sons of Scottish Barons and sons of Baronets or Barontesses. Certain professions and qualifications were also associated with Esquires in the past, including Barristers, Doctors of Philosophy or certain offices in court. In the United Kingdom, untitled nobility is not only determined by bloodline or royal ennoblement, similar to the first representatives of Spanish or Portuguese "hidalgos" or "fidalgos".

As mentioned, in France, as well as in the Low Countries, the honorifics Écuyer and Jonkheer are the most closely related as they both denote nobility and rank immediately beneath Knights,.

== Modern usage in German surnames and alphabetical sorting ==
The title Edler was banned in Austria with the abolition of Austrian nobility in 1919. In Germany, when the German nobility was stripped of its privileges under the Article 109 of Weimar Constitution in 1919, the title was transformed into a dependent part of the legal surname.

Since that time, the terms Edle, Edler von etc. are not to be translated, as they have lost their title status. These terms now appear following the given name, e.g. Wolfgang Gans Edler Herr zu Putlitz. As dependent parts of the surnames (nichtselbständige Namensbestandteile), the terms Edle, Edler von etc. are ignored in alphabetical sorting of names, as is the eventual nobility particle, and might or might not be used by those bearing them. The unofficial titles do, however, retain prestige in some circles of society, where it can be used out of courtesy.
