= List of castles in Estonia =

This is a list of castles in Estonia. This list does not include palaces and manor houses, which are listed in a separate article.

== Castles of the Teutonic Order ==
Image	Name	Construction date	Location	Current state
	Helme Castle	14th century	Helme	Ruin
	Karksi Castle	14th century	Karksi-Nuia	Ruin
	Keila Castle	15th-16th century	Keila	Ruin
	Kursi Castle	15th-16th century	Puurmani	Ruin
	Laiuse Castle	14th century	Laiusevälja	Ruin
	Maasilinna Castle	1345	Maasi	Ruin
	Hermann Castle	1256	Narva	Partially preserved
	Paide Castle	1265-1266	Paide	Partially preserved
	Põltsamaa Castle	1272	Põltsamaa	Ruin
	Pärnu Castle	1265	Pärnu	Partially preserved
	Pöide Castle	13th century	Pöide	Partially preserved
	Rakvere Castle	13th century	Rakvere	Partially preserved
	Toompea Castle	13th century	Tallinn	Partially preserved
	Tarvastu Castle	13th century	Tarvastu	Ruin
	Toolse Castle	1471	Toolse	Ruin
	Vasknarva Castle	1349	Vasknarva	Ruin
	Viljandi Castle	1224	Viljandi	Ruin

== Castles of the Bishopric of Dorpat ==
Image	Name	Construction date	Location	Current state
	Kirumpää Castle	before 1322	Kirumpää	Ruin
	Otepää Castle	?	Otepää	Ruin
	Rõngu Castle	14th century	Rõngu	Ruin
	Tartu Castle	8th century	Tartu	Ruin
	Uue-Kastre Castle	14th century?	Võnnu	?
	Vana-Kastre Castle	14th century?	Vana-Kastre	?
	Vastseliina Castle	1342	Vastseliina	Ruin

== Castles of the Bishopric of Ösel-Wiek ==
Image	Name	Construction date	Location	Current state
	Haapsalu Castle	13th century	Haapsalu	Partially preserved
	Koluvere Castle	13th century	Koluvere	Partially preserved
	Kuressaare Castle	1380's	Kuressaare	Partially preserved
	Lihula Castle	1211	Lihula	Ruin

== Castles of the Bishopric of Reval ==
Image	Name	Construction date	Location	Current state
	Kiviloo Castle	1413	Kiviloo	Ruin
	Porkuni Castle	1479	Lihula	Partially preserved

== Other castles ==
Image	Name	Construction date	Location	Current state
	Angerja Castle	around 1400	Angerja	Ruin
	Äntu Hill Fort		Lääne-Viru County, Äntu	
	Glehn Castle	1886	Nõmme	Built by Nikolai von Glehn
	Iru Hill Fort (Iru hill fort)		Harju County	
	Jäneda hillfort		Lääne-Viru County	
	Järve Castle	?	Järve	Ruin
	Kalvi Castle	1485	Kalvi	Ruin
	Kavilda Castle	1354	Mõisanurme	Ruin
	Kiiu Castle	1520	Kiiu	Partially preserved
	Kiltsi Castle	1466	Kiltsi	Partially preserved
	Purtse Castle	16th century	Purtse	Partially preserved
	Sangaste Castle	1881	Sangaste	Partially preserved
	Äntu Hill Fort		Lääne-Viru County, Äntu	
	Vaabina Castle	16th century (?)	Vaabina	Destroyed
	Vao Castle	14th century	Vao	Partially preserved
	Vääna Castle	1325	Vääna	Ruin
	Vooremägi	?	Purtsi	Ruin?

== See also ==
- List of castles
- List of palaces and manor houses in Estonia
- List of palaces and manor houses in Latvia
