= Vao, Lääne-Viru County =

Village in Lääne-Viru County, Estonia

Coordinates: 59°06′05″N 26°11′37″E

Vao
- Village
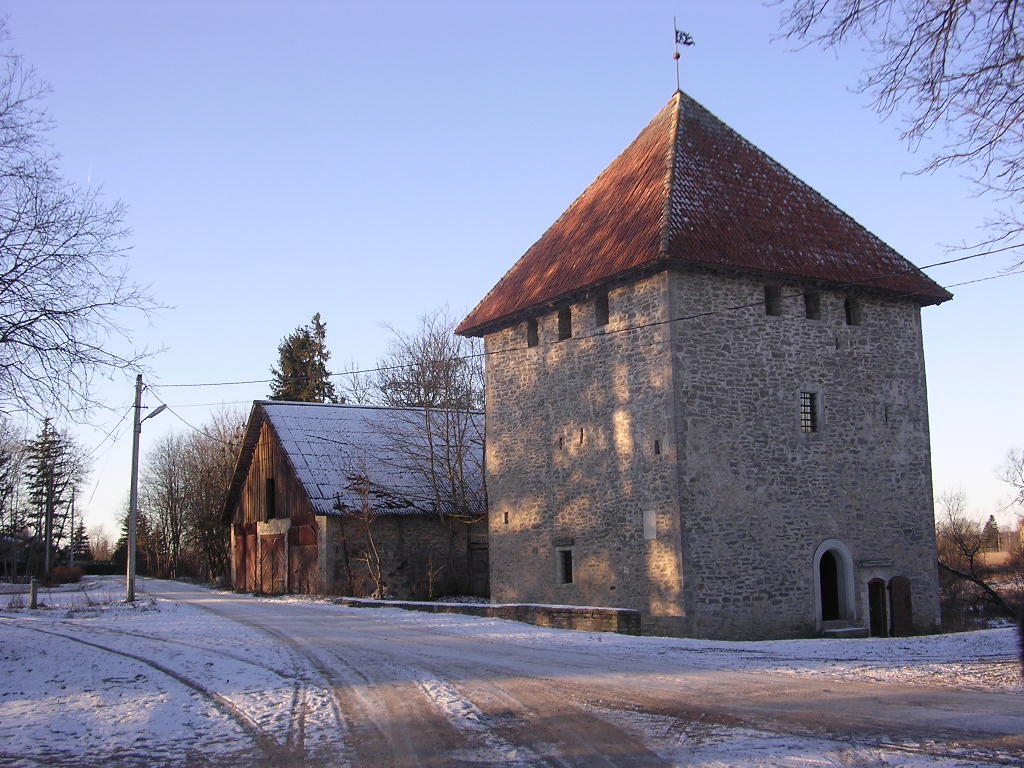
- Vao tower house (German: Burg Wack)
- Interactive map of Vao
- Country: Estonia
- County: Lääne-Viru County
- Parish: Väike-Maarja Parish
- Time zone: UTC+2 (EET)
  - Summer (DST): UTC+3 (EEST)

Vao is a village in Väike-Maarja Parish, Lääne-Viru County, in northeastern Estonia.

Since 2014, Vao is the location of Vao Accommodation Centre, an accommodation centre for asylum seekers. Since the European migrant crisis has gained wide media attention in Estonia, Vao Centre has become the site of demonstrations against refugees. On 3 September 2015, the external wall of the center was set on fire. No one was hurt in the incident.

== Vao Castle ==
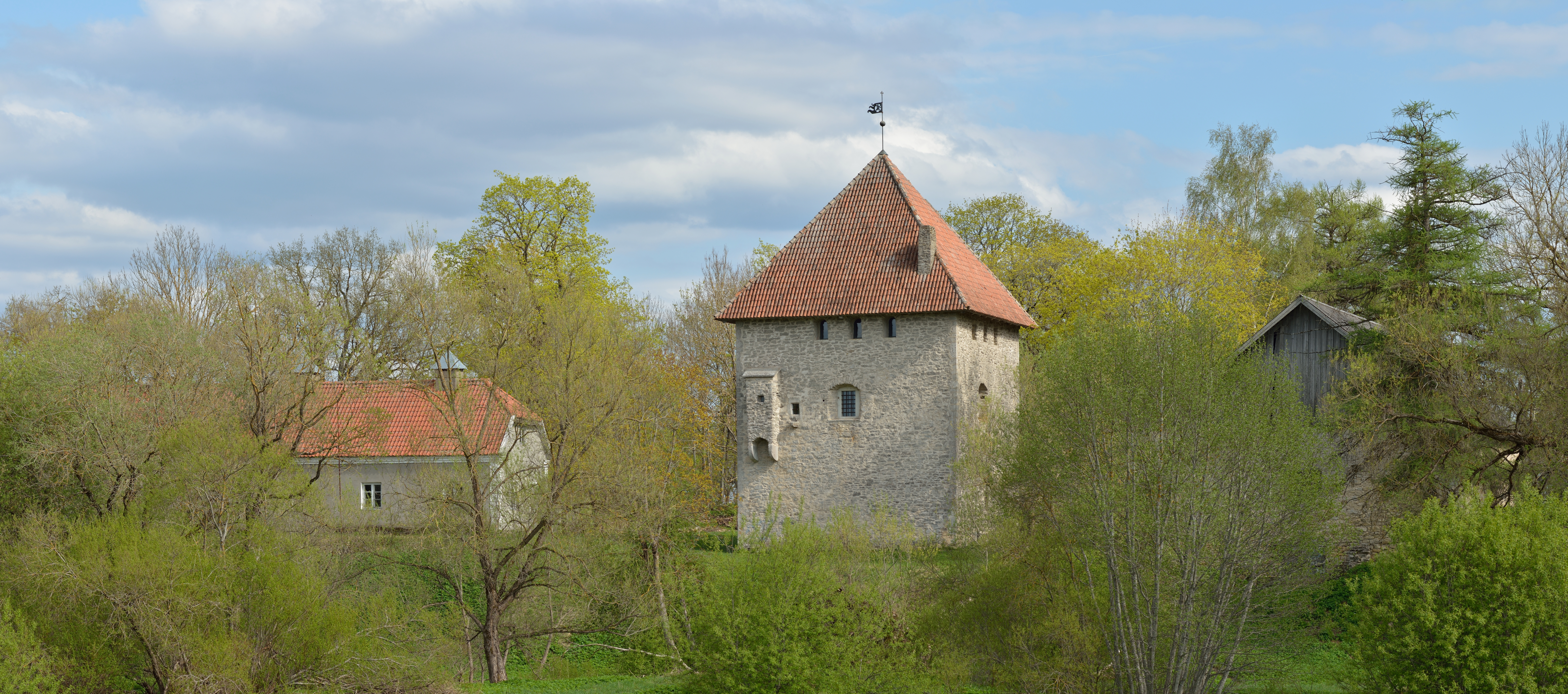
Vao castle, with the protruding latrine visible on the left side of the building

Vao castle (German: Burg Wack) is a well-preserved medieval tower fortress (more at Wack tower house). It was built in the later half of the 14th century as a tower house, being what Baltic castellology calls "vassal castle", i.e. a small castle built to keep control in areas where large strongholds were not needed. Other notable examples of such castles in Estonia are Purtse and Kiiu castles.

In 1442, the castle belonged to the family Wack. Subsequently it has belonged to various aristocratic families. In the 1770s the tower was certainly no longer used as a manor, since at this time a new Baroque manor house was built in the vicinity. In 1986, the castle was renovated. During the renovation new painted glass windows made by Estonian artists Tuuli Puhvel and Anne Ehasalu were installed. There is no indication that the tower was ever involved in any military action.

The castle was not designed for any major military operations, which can be deduced from the thickness of the walls. It was built of local limestone, to a height of four storeys. The cellar was used for storage, the ground floor was used as an office for the feudal lord, the second floor was the Lord's living quarters and the top floor had a purely defensive function. The living quarters were well equipped with a latrine, a chapel, a bed alcove and a fireplace.

== See also ==
- History of Estonia
- List of castles in Estonia
