= Kiiu =

Borough in Estonia

- Small borough
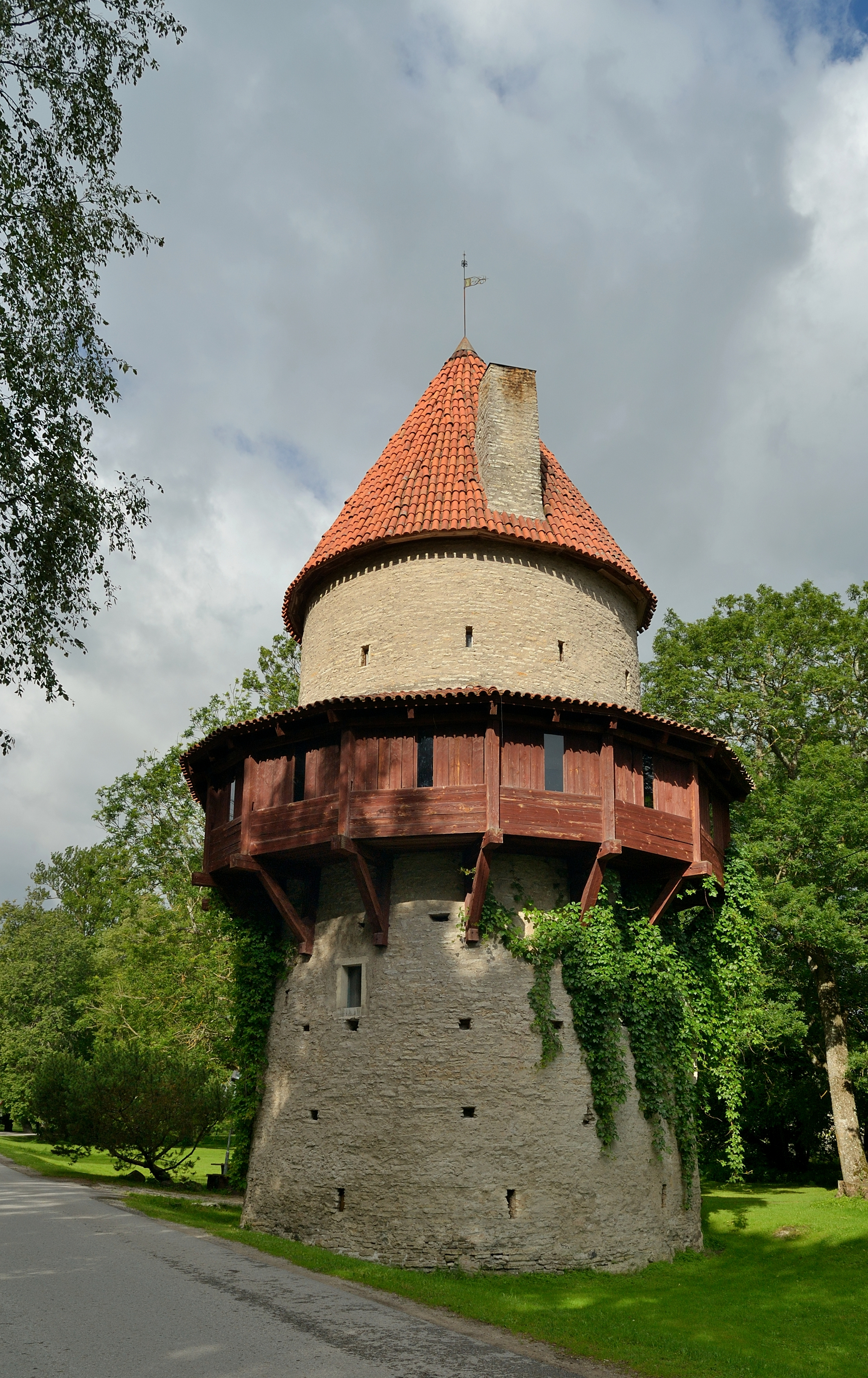
- Kiiu Tower

- Location in Estonia
- Coordinates: 59°27′05″N 25°22′58″E
- Country: Estonia
- County: Harju County
- Municipality: Kuusalu Parish

Population (01.01.2012)
  - Total: 859

Kiiu is a small borough (Estonian: alevik) in Kuusalu Parish, Harju County, northern Estonia. It has a population of 859 (as of 1 January 2012).

== Kiiu Tower ==
Kiiu tower (German: Burg Kyda) is a medieval defensive tower house of a type found also elsewhere in the Baltic region and sometimes referred to as a "vassal castle". This type of fortification was not intended to be used in any major military operations. Other examples in Estonia include the Vao tower house and Purtse Castle.

The Kiiu tower was probably built around 1520 by the local lord of the manor, Fabian von Tiesenhausen. Originally, the tower was surrounded by a limestone wall and outbuildings, forming a courtyard. The tower itself is conical and four storeys high. Only the second storey was intended to be used as living quarters in times of war or unrest. On this floor, a bed alcove is found in the wall, as well as a fireplace and latrine, which are also present on the other storeys. All the other storeys had purely defensive purposes, including embrasures of 11 different shapes, and were connected by a spiral staircase running through the thick wall. The reconstructed hoarding that surrounds the third storey is unique in Estonia.

The tower was damaged during the Livonian War and subsequently used as an outbuilding for the local manor house. In 1973 the tower was restored under the guidance of well-known art historian Villem Raam.

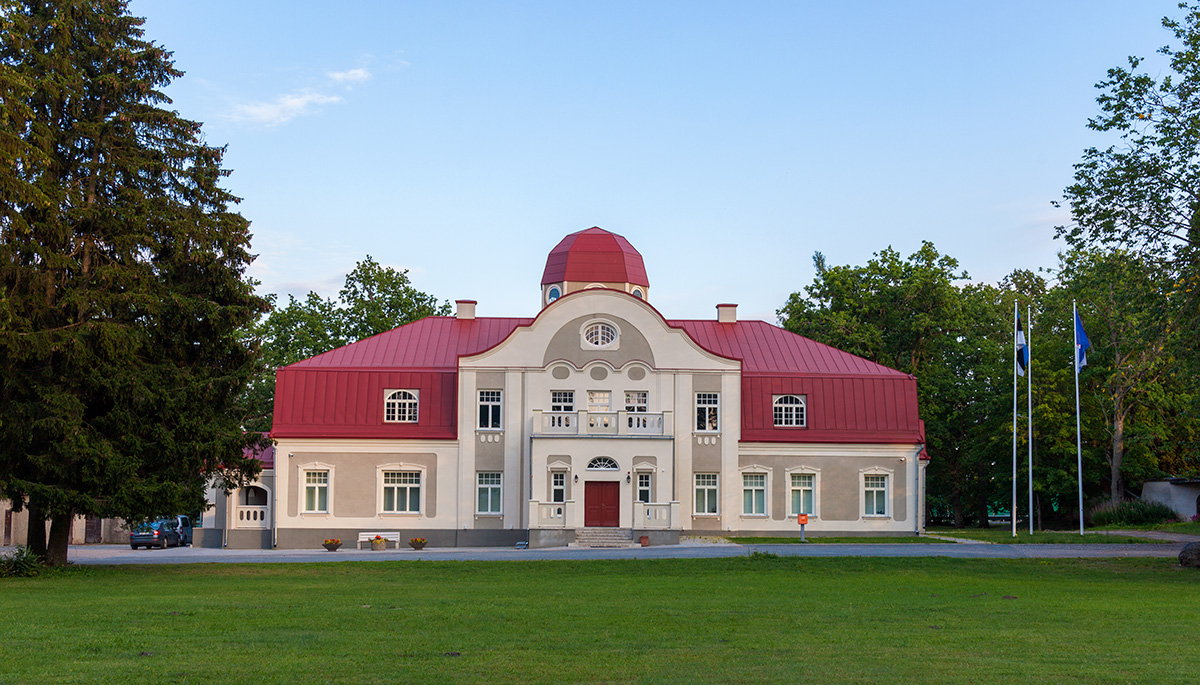
Kiiu manor, first established c. 1348.

=== See also ===
- List of castles in Estonia
