= Laiuse =

Borough in Estonia

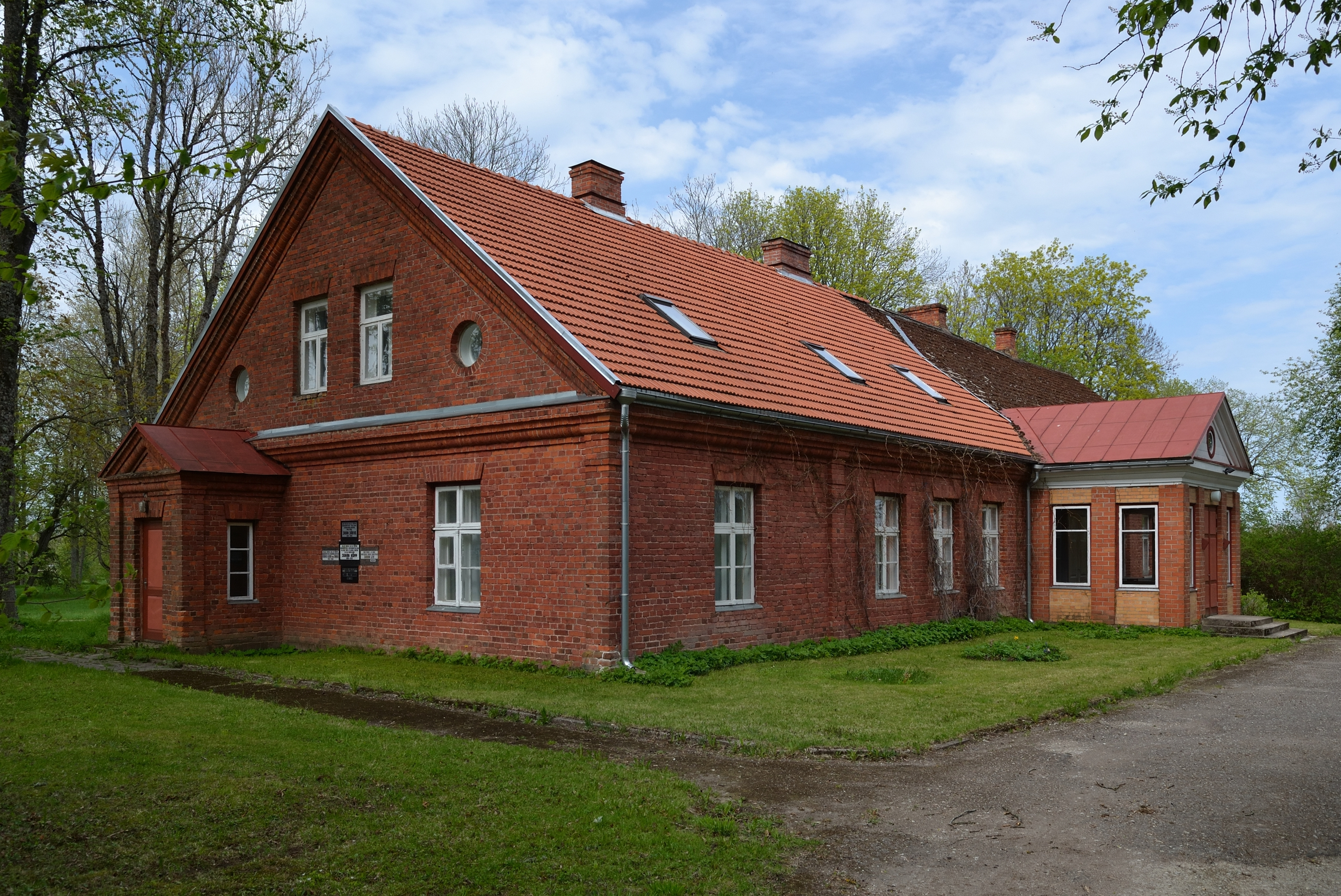
- Laiuse rectory main building

- Location within Estonia
- Coordinates: 58°47′04″N 26°29′50″E
- Country: Estonia
- County: Jõgeva County

Population (2011 census)
  - Total: 371
- Time zone: UTC+2 (EET)

Laiuse (Polish: Lajs, German: Lais) is a small borough (alevik) in Estonia. It is located in Jõgeva County and is part of Jõgeva Parish. As of the 2011 census, the settlement's population was 371.

Laiuse Primary School, established in 1822, is one of the oldest in Estonia.

== History ==
During the Livonian War, in 1569, Laiuse Castle was besieged twice by the Livonian Order under Gotthard Kettler. After the war, from 1582 Laiuse (known as Lajs in Polish) was part of Poland. It was the seat of northernmost county (starostwo) in the history of Poland. King Stephen Báthory appointed Andrzej Orzechowski the county administrator (starost) of Lajs as a reward for his bravery in the Livonian War, and in 1589 King Sigismund III Vasa confirmed the appointment. Andrzej Orzechowski rebuilt the castle following the war, which then served as the seat of the administrators. The population of Lajs exceeded 200.

At the start of the Polish–Swedish War of 1600–1611, in 1600, the castle was besieged and captured by Sweden, but was restored to Poland the following year. In 1622, the settlement passed to Sweden, although Poland still appointed the administrators of Lajs until the loss of the area was confirmed in 1660. In 1700, the castle served as the main winter quarters of King Charles XII of Sweden. Later it passed to Russia, before it became part of independent Estonia in 1918.

== Laiuse Church ==
Laiuse is the location of medieval Laiuse Church. The church was first mentioned in 1319. In the churchyard, there is an old lime tree, which is said to have been planted there by King Charles XII of Sweden during his visit in 1701.

== Gallery ==
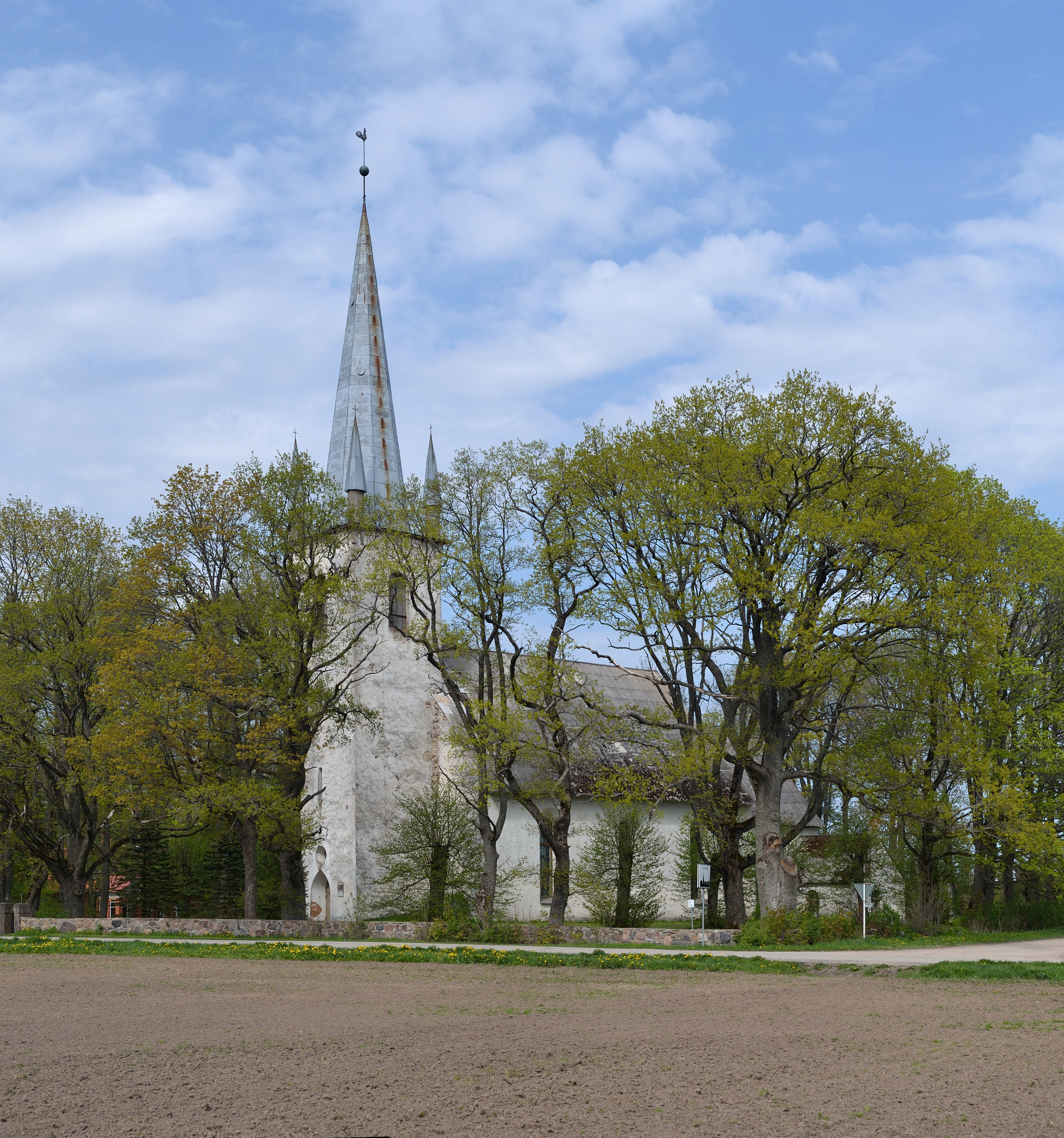
Laiuse Church

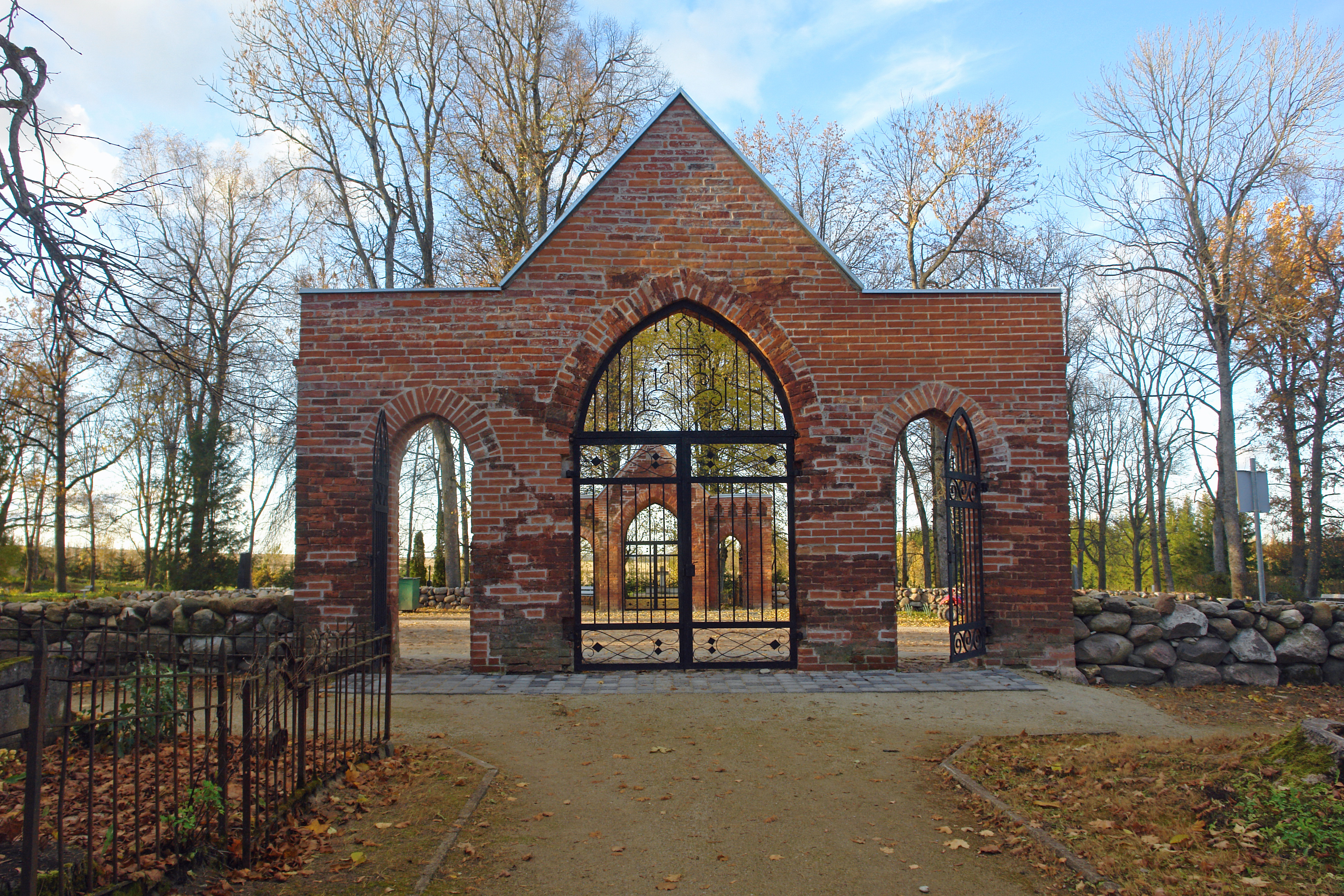
Cemetery

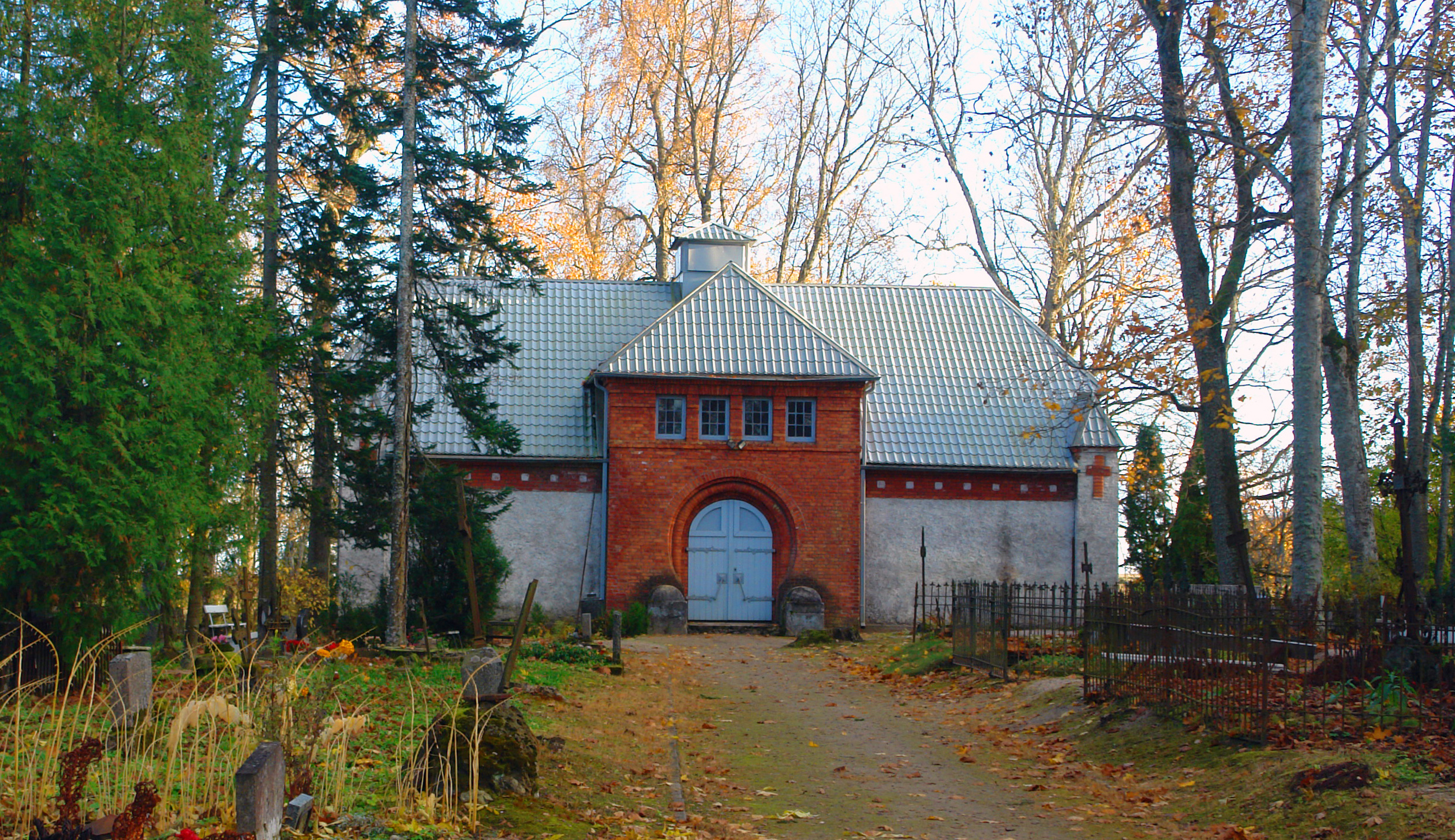
Cemetery chapel

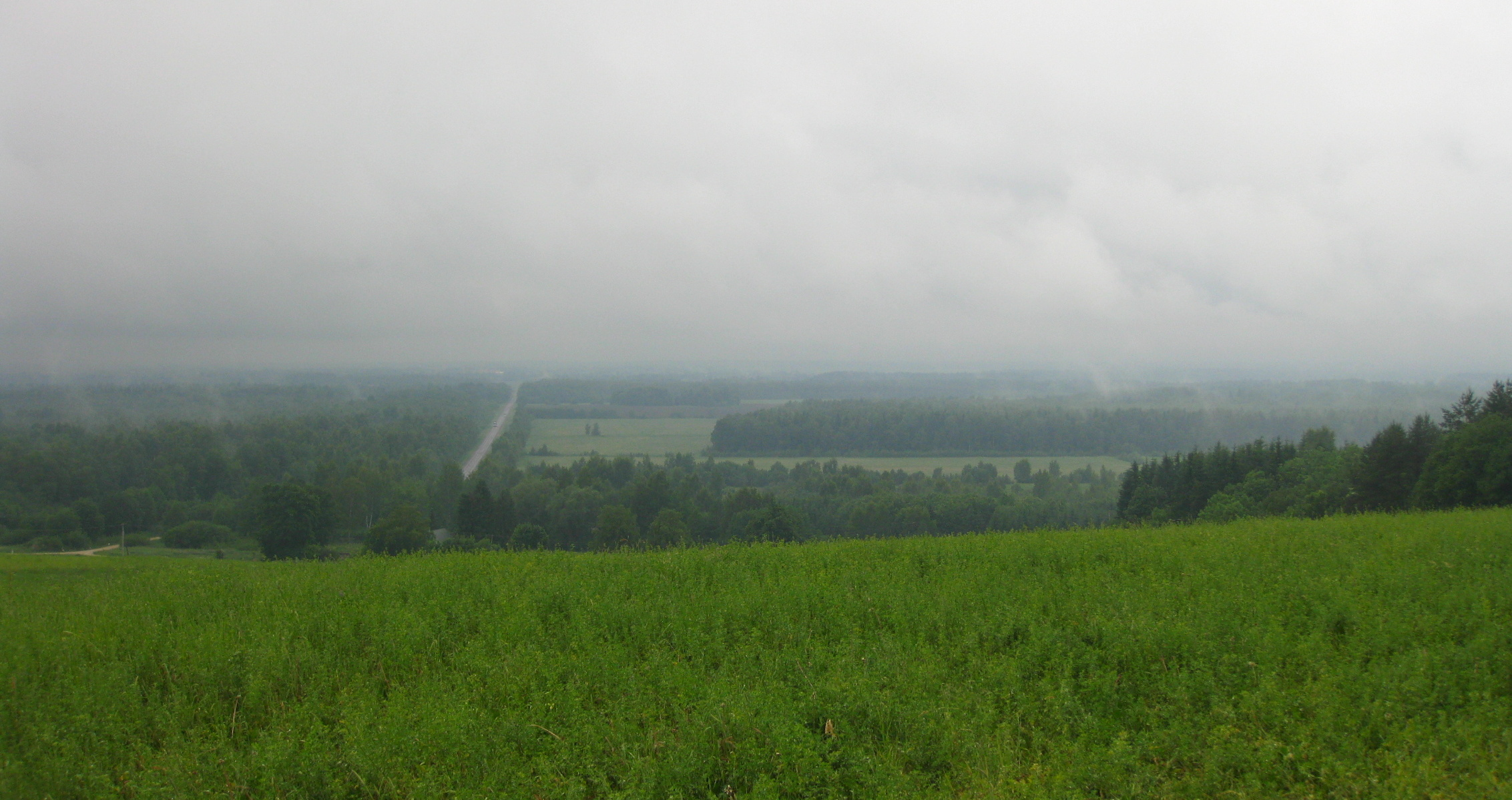
Laiuse hill

== See also ==
- Laiuse Romani
- Laiuse Castle
- Laiusevälja
