= Kirumpää =

Village in Estonia

- village
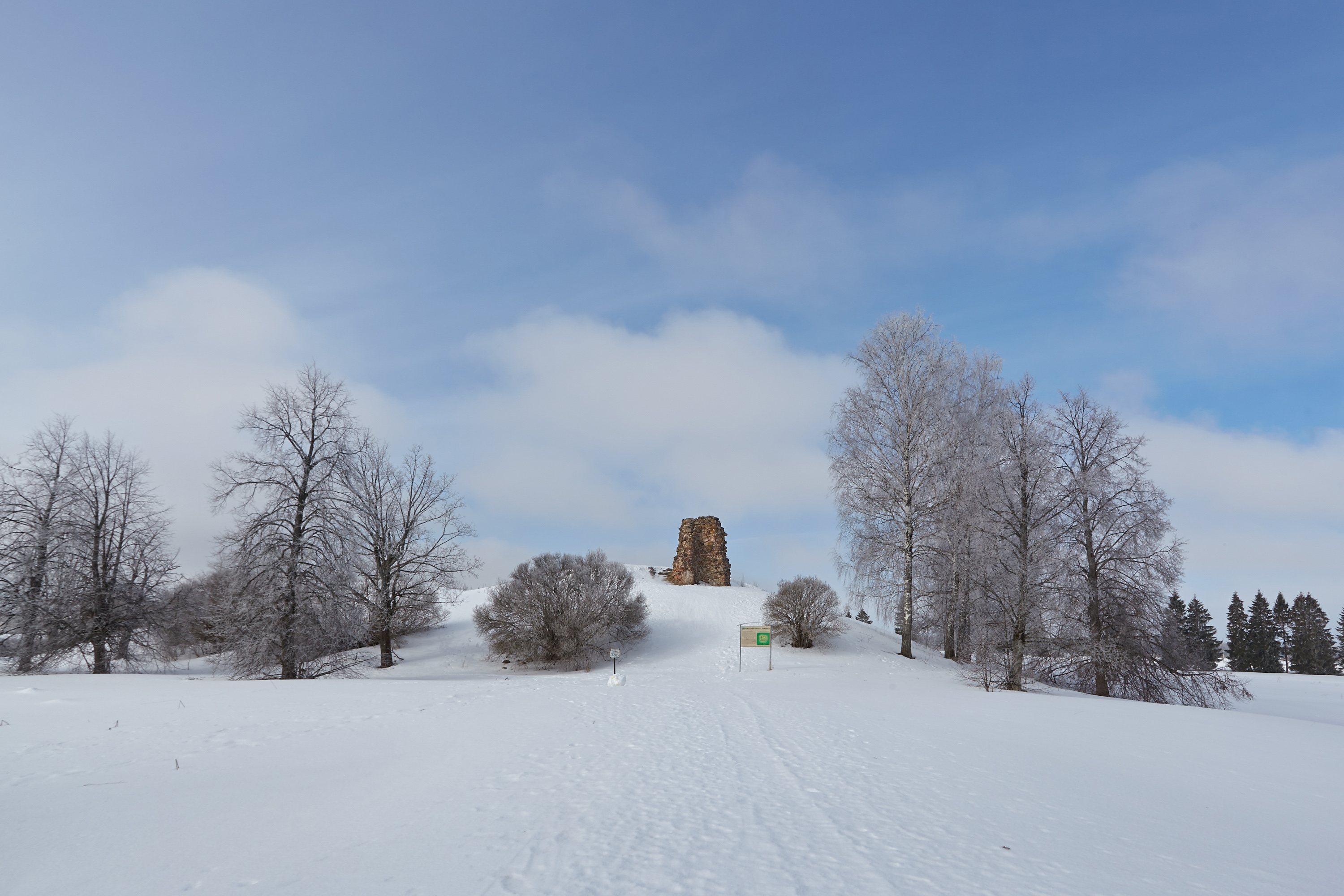
- Kirumpää castle ruins in winter

- Location in Estonia
- Coordinates: 57°51′48″N 26°59′22″E
- Country: Estonia
- County: Võru County
- Municipality: Võru Parish

Kirumpää is a village in Võru Parish, Võru County, in southeastern Estonia.

== Kirumpää castle ruins ==
A castle was built at this tactical position on a mound by Võhandu River, controlling an important road, sometime during the late 13th to early 14th century; it was first mentioned in written sources in 1322 when it is reported that it was pillaged by Gediminas, the famous Grand Duke of Lithuania. That structure would have been a simple, fortified manor house. It was later expanded in phases, eventually (circa 1500) housing a chapel, round tower and a forecourt. During the early years of the Livonian War, the castle was damaged by Russian troops but reported in use again in 1627. During the end of the 17th century it seems however to have fallen into disrepair, and later used as a quarry for builders in nearby Võru. Today few visible ruins remain.

Kirumpää is the birthplace of heavyweight weightlifter Kaljo Raag (1892–1967).

=== Gallery ===
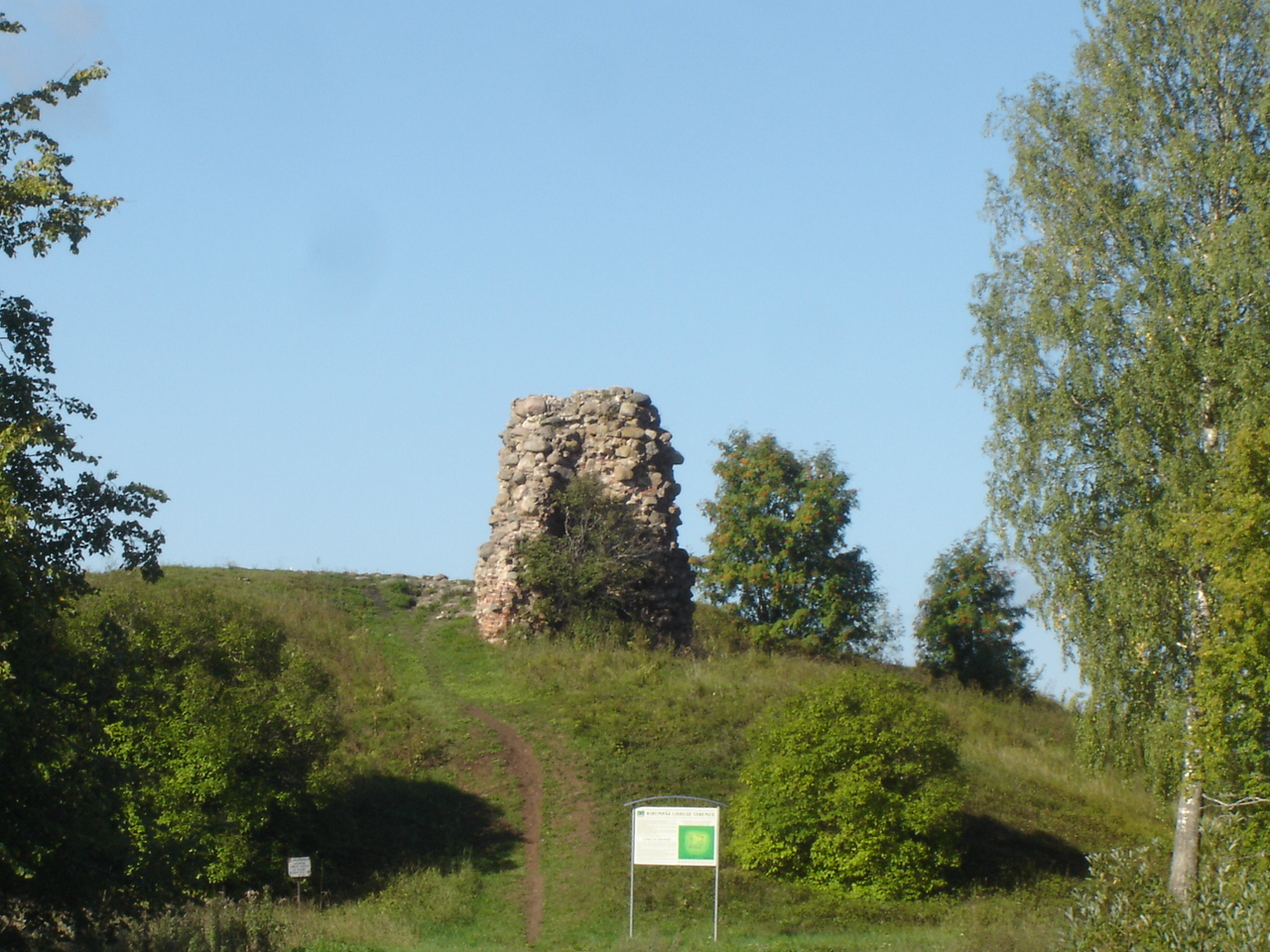
Kirumpää castle ruins

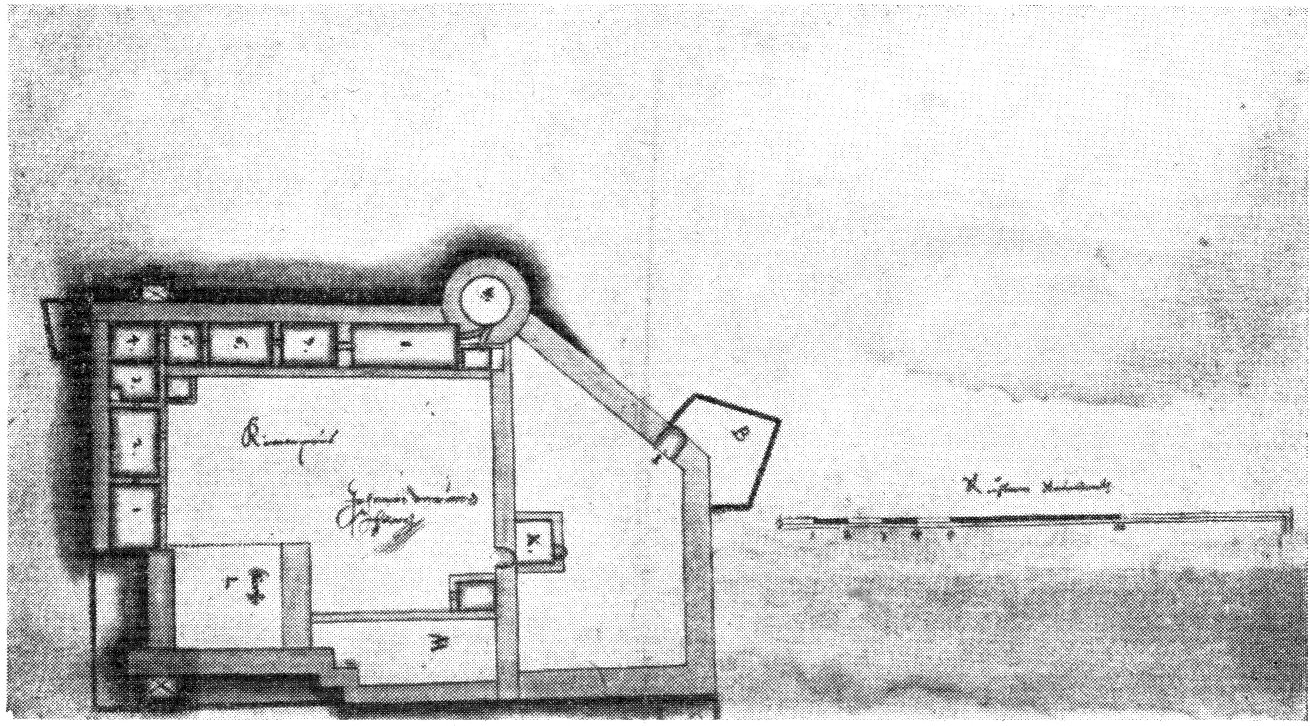
Plan of the then still existing Kirumpää castle, 17th century

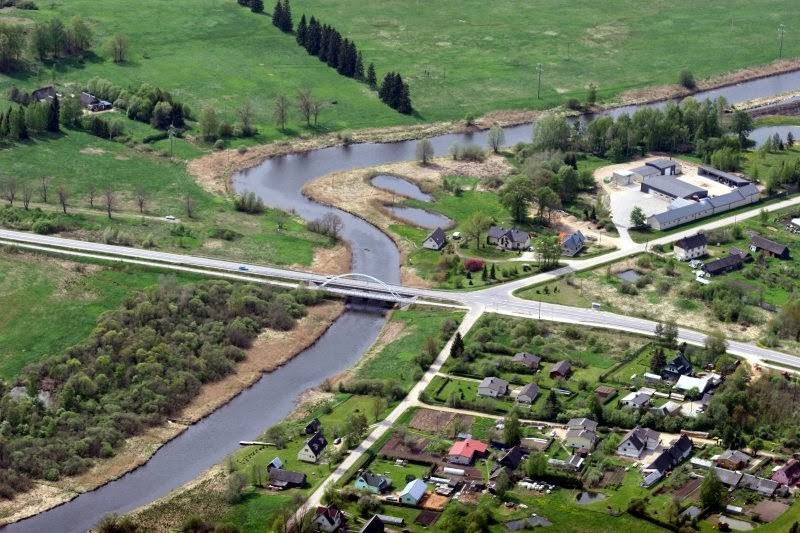
Kirumpää bridge over the Võhandu river

== See also ==
- List of castles in Estonia
