= Pärnu Castle =

Medieval tower in Pärnu, Estonia

The Red Tower
- Pärnu, Pärnu County, Estonia
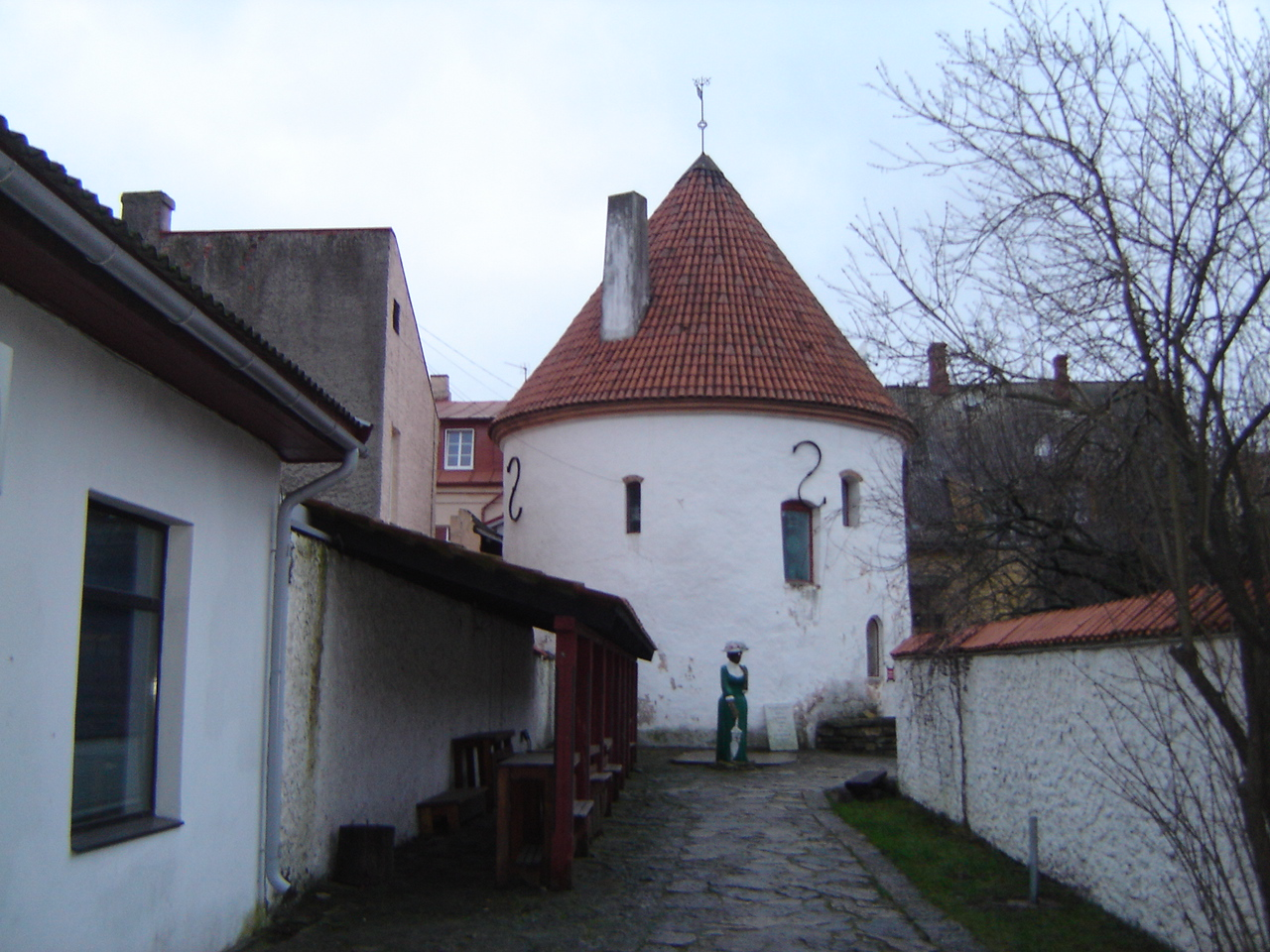
- Red Tower of the Pärnu Castle.

Site information
- Type: Tower

Location
- Coordinates: 58°23′06″N 24°30′10″E

The Red Tower (Estonian: Punane torn) is a medieval tower in Pärnu, in nowadays Estonia. Also currently called "The Red Tower," it was built in the 15th century originally as a prison. It is the last defensive tower remaining of the Hanseactic town "New-Pärnu." In the 17th century, the tower had four stories and a prison cell 6 meters deep. In the 19th century, it was used as the town archives. Only 3 stories remain.

== See also ==
- List of castles in Estonia
