= Laiusevälja =

Village in Estonia

- village
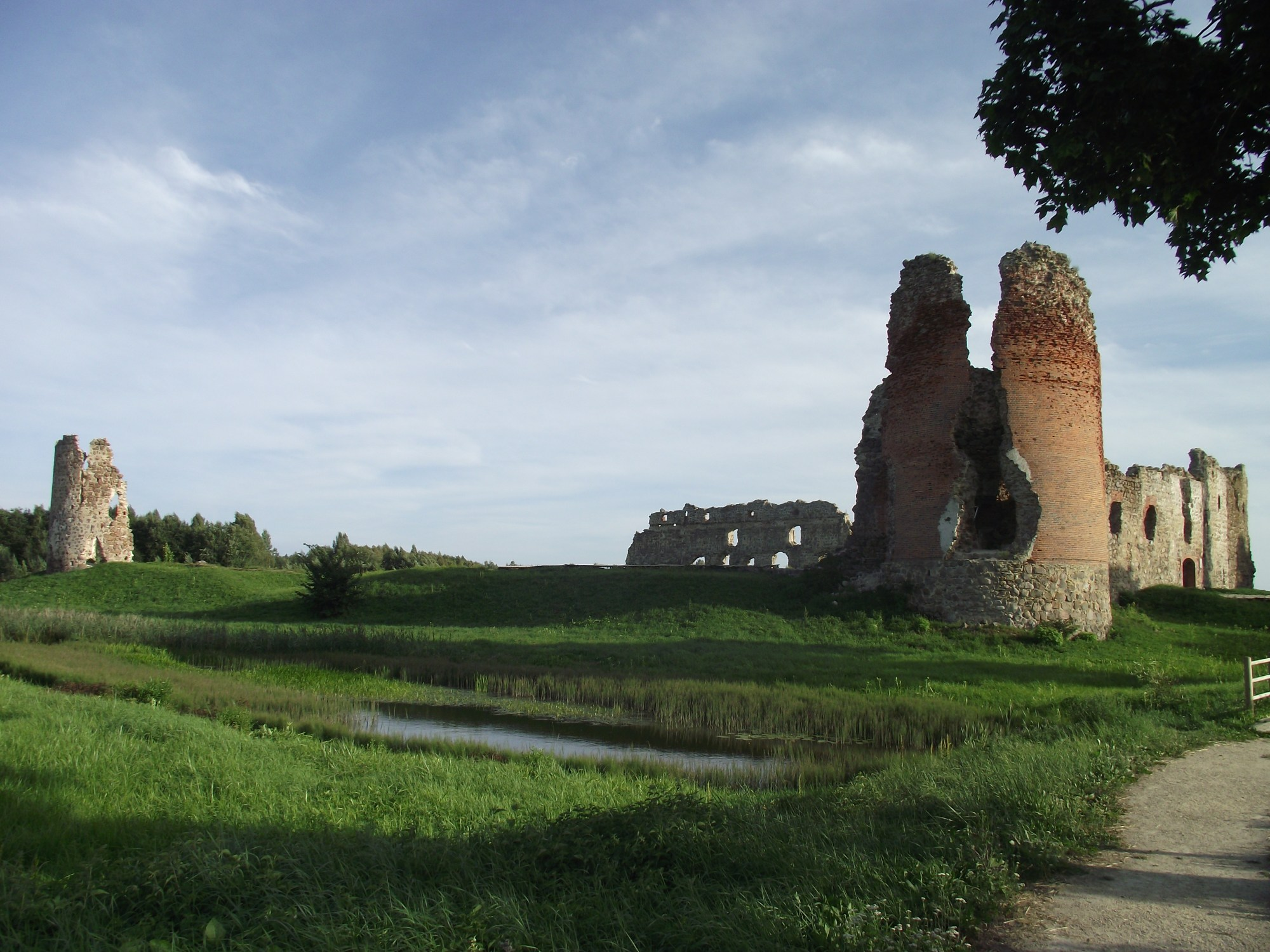
- Ruins of Laiuse Castle in Laiusevälja.

- Location in Estonia
- Coordinates: 58°48′35″N 26°32′03″E
- Country: Estonia
- County: Jõgeva County
- Municipality: Jõgeva Parish

Population (01.01.2011)
  - Total: 119

Laiusevälja (Estonian for Laiuse Field) is a village in Jõgeva Parish, Jõgeva County, Estonia. It is located about 10 km northeast of the town of Jõgeva, adjacent to Laiuse small borough, on the Jõgeva–Mustvee road (nr. 36). Laiusevälja has a population of 119 (as of 1 January 2011).

Laiusevälja is the site of Laiuse Castle ruins, a former Livonian Order castle built in the end of 14th century. There are also ruins of a wooden Eastern Orthodox church (Laiuse Church of the Nativity of the Mother of God; Estonian: Laiuse Jumalaema Sündimise kirik) built in 1864. Important Estonian diplomat and politician Jaan Poska (1866–1920) was born in the house of local sacristan next to the church. Estonian military commander Nikolai Helk (1886–1941) was later born in the same house.

Orthodox cemetery was established already in 1861.

== Gallery ==
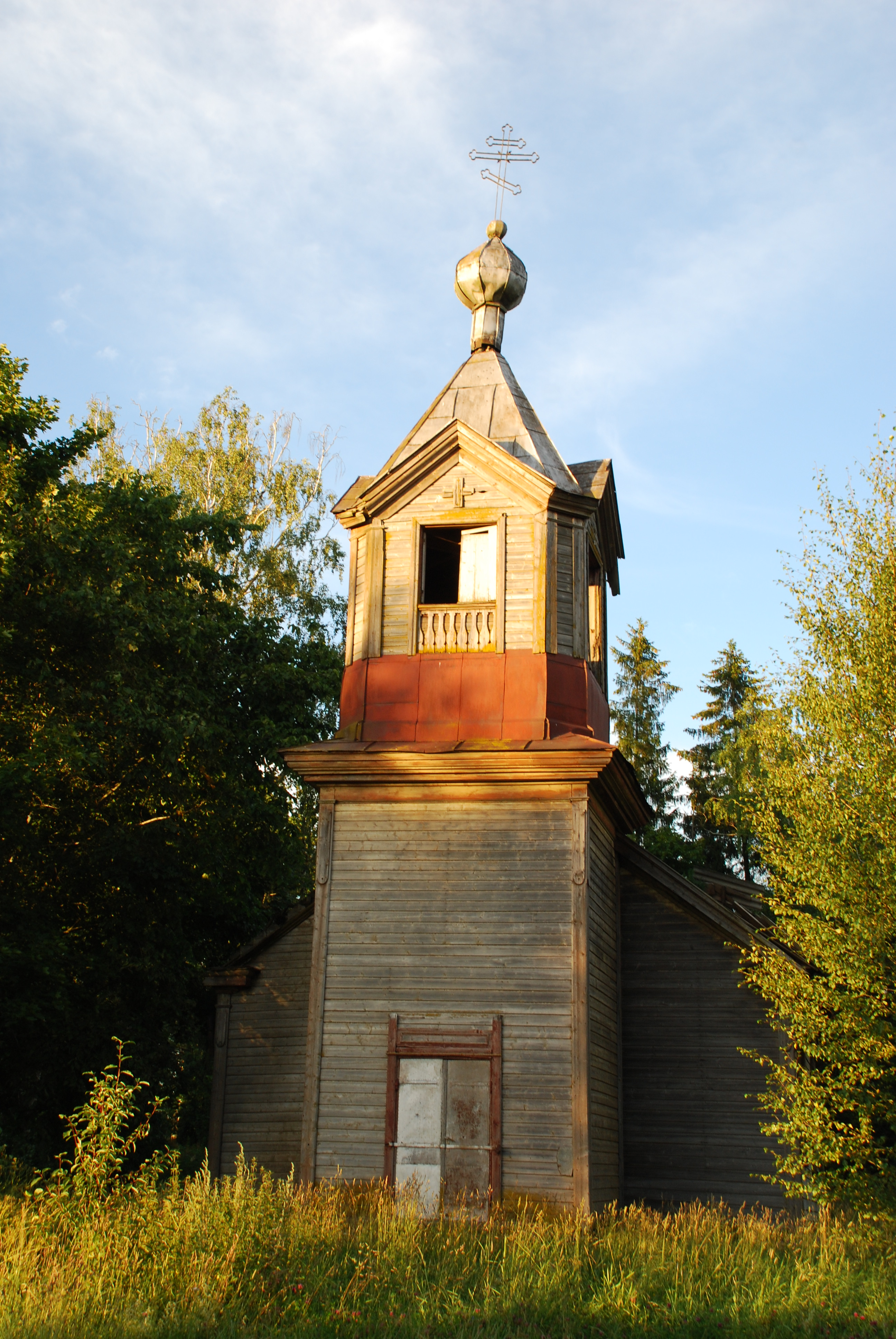
Ruins of Laiuse Orthodox Church in Laiusevälja.

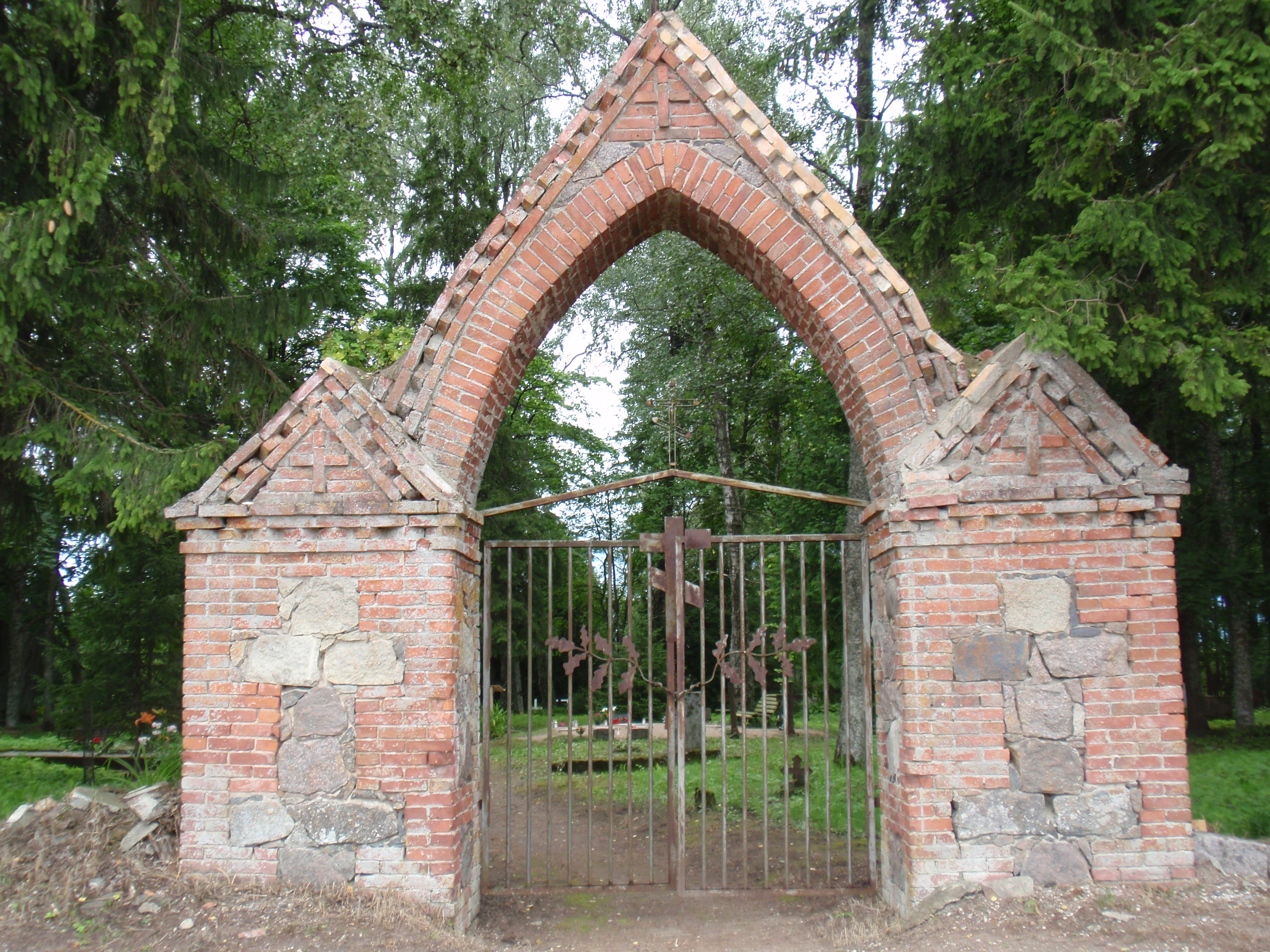
Entrance to Mõisaküla Orthodox cemetery in Laiusevälja.

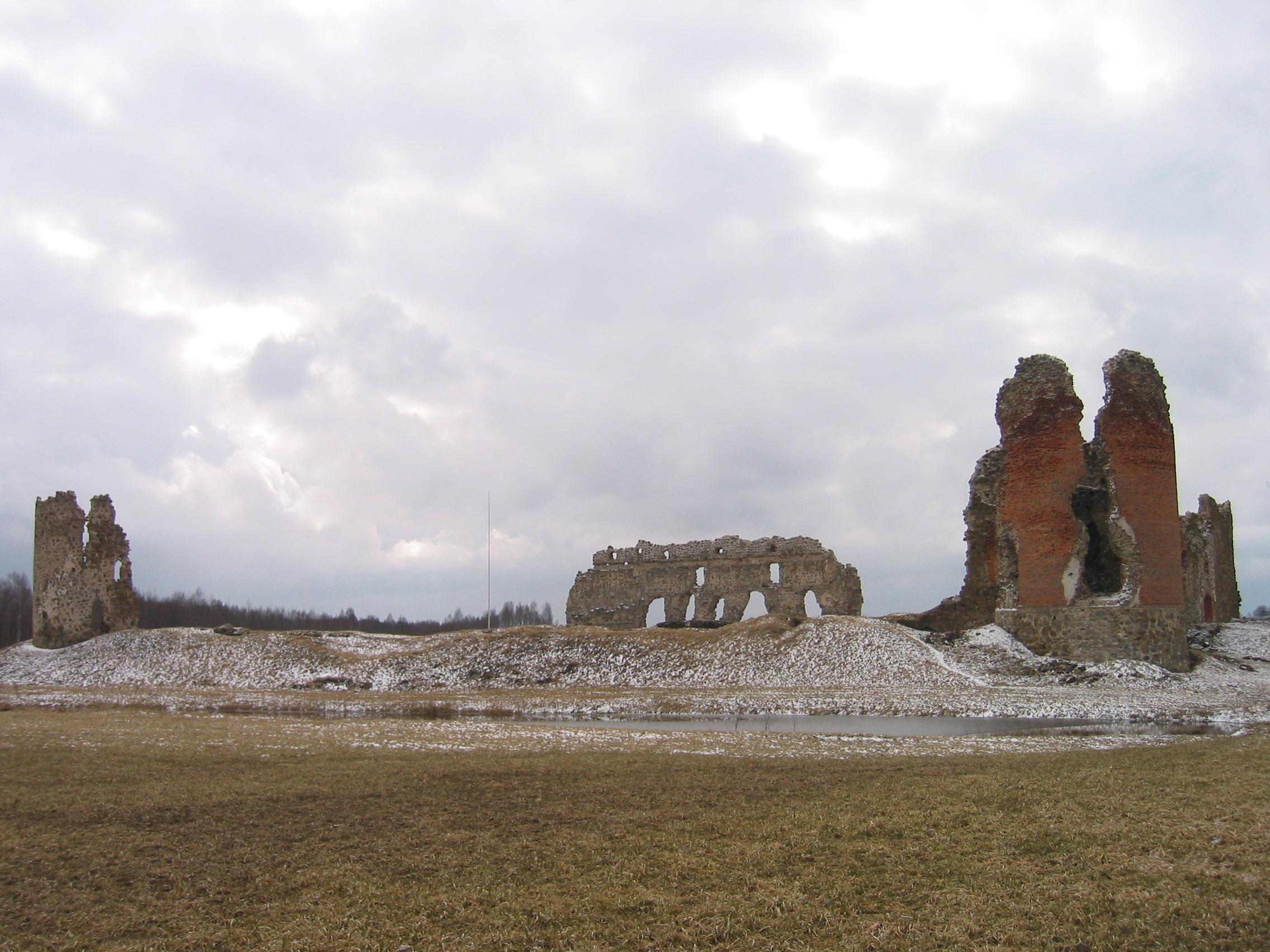
Laiuse Castle ruins.
