= Vana-Kastre =

Village in Estonia

Coordinates: 58°21′N 26°55′E

- Village
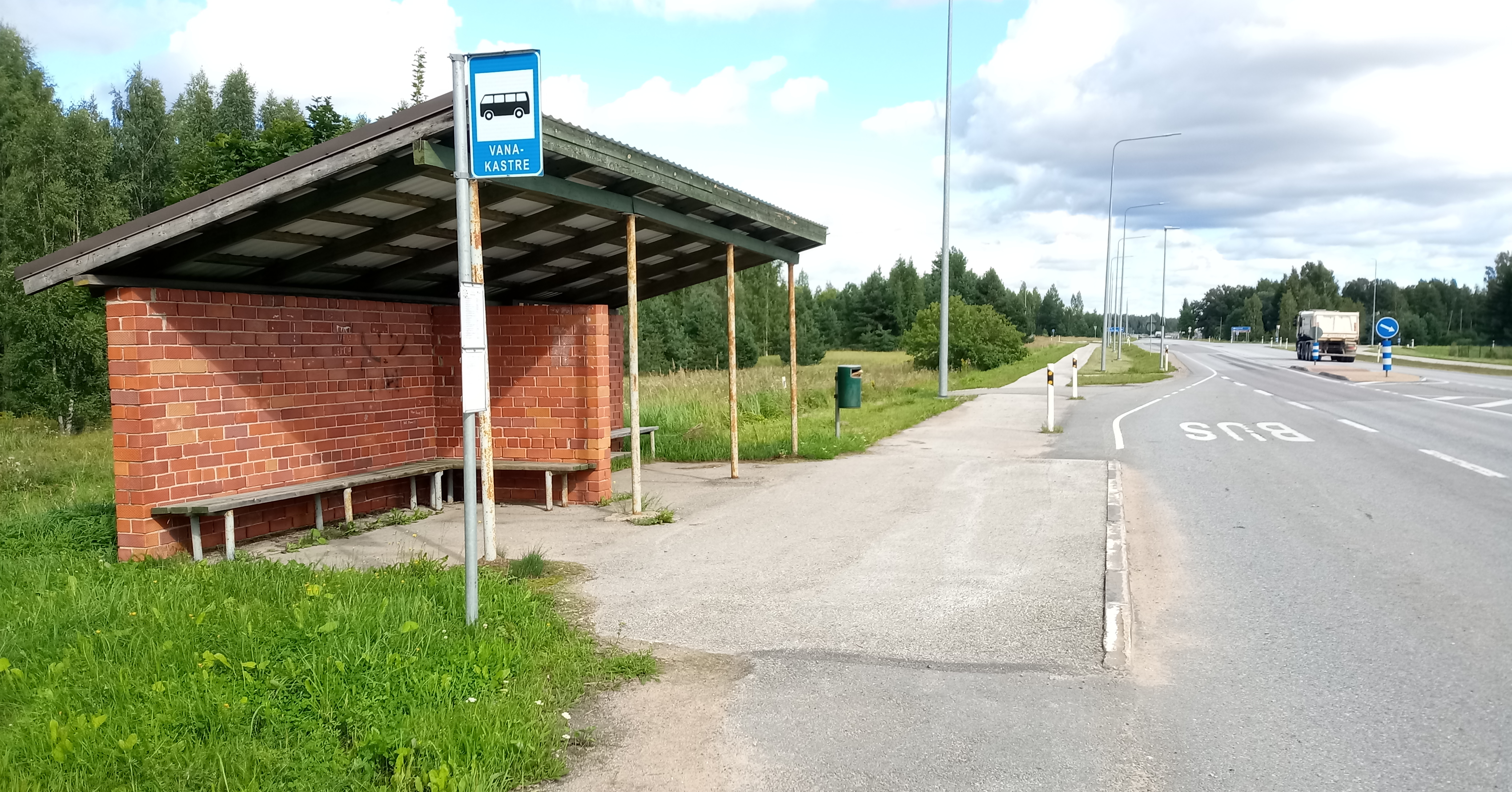
- Vana-Kastre bus station
- Interactive map of Vana-Kastre
- Country: Estonia
- County: Tartu County
- Parish: Kastre Parish
- Time zone: UTC+2 (EET)
  - Summer (DST): UTC+3 (EEST)

Vana-Kastre (German: Altenturm) is a village in Kastre Parish, Tartu County in eastern Estonia.
