= Purtse =

Village in Estonia

Coordinates: 59°24′41″N 27°00′44″E

- Village
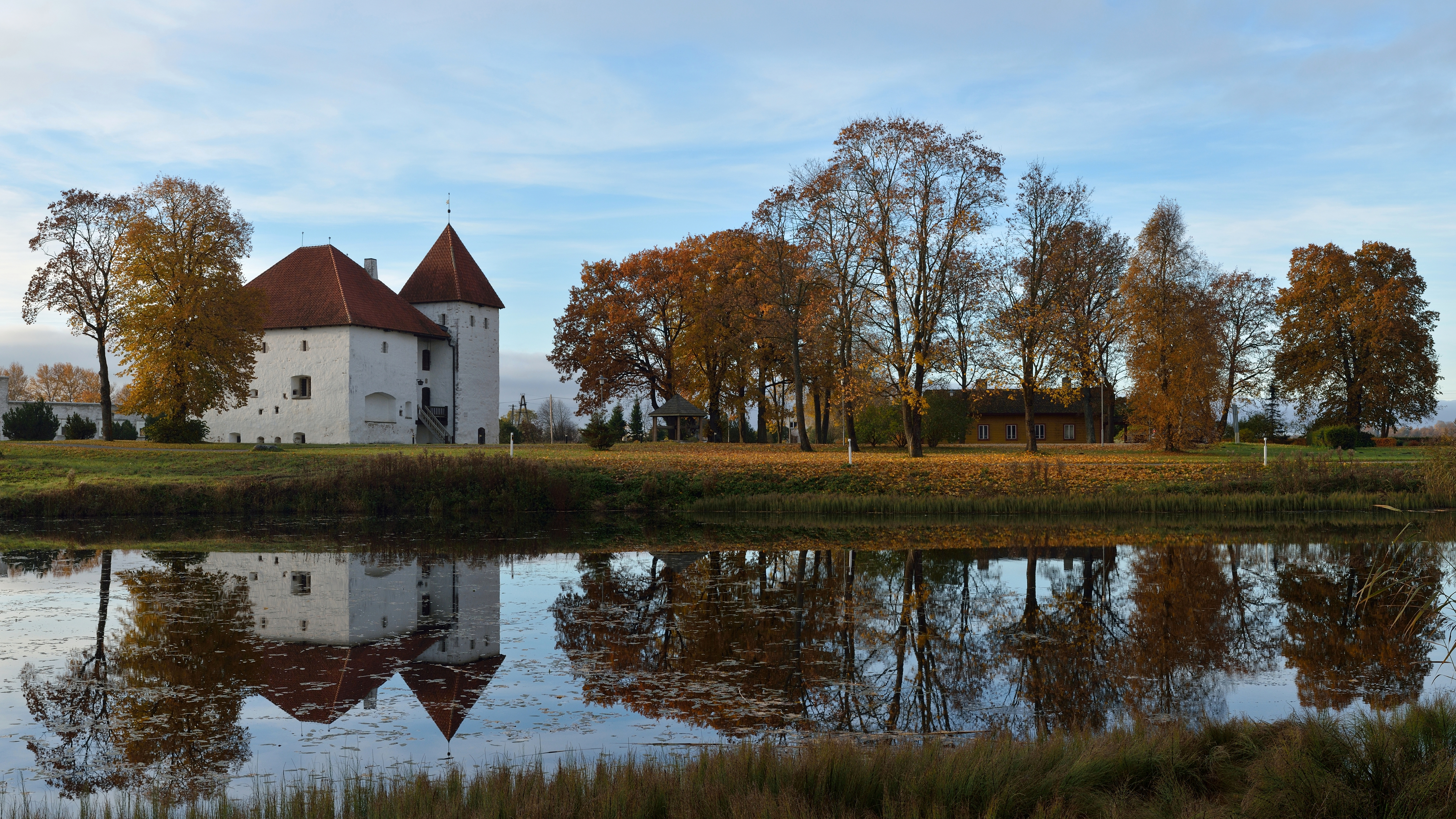
- Purtse Castle
- Interactive map of Purtse
- Country: Estonia
- County: Ida-Viru County
- Parish: Lüganuse Parish
- Time zone: UTC+2 (EET)
  - Summer (DST): UTC+3 (EEST)

Purtse is a village in Lüganuse Parish, Ida-Viru County in northeastern Estonia.

Purtse is best known as the location of 16th century Purtse Castle.

== Gallery ==
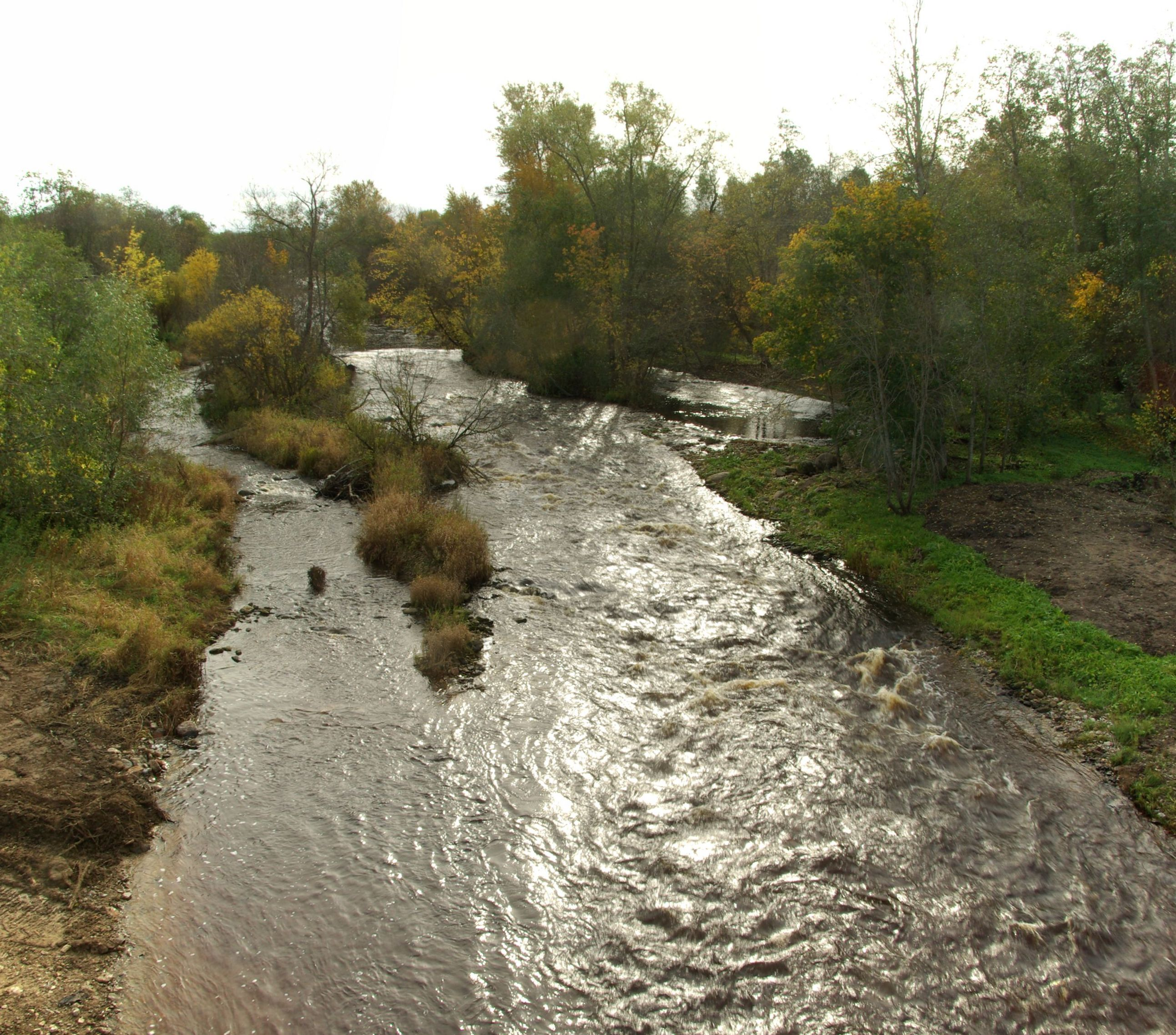
Purtse River seen from the Tallinn–Narva highway (E20) bridge in Purtse.

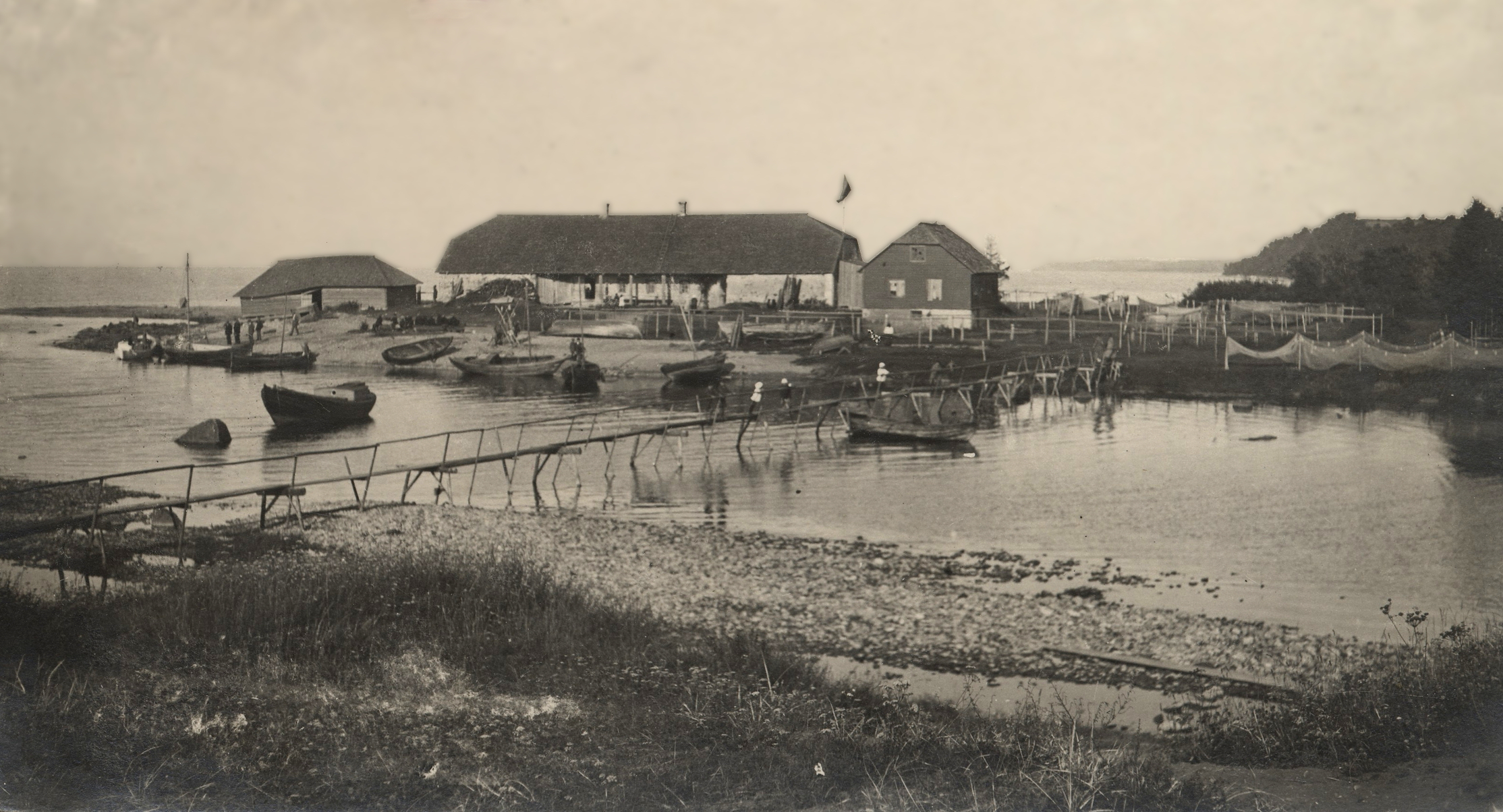
Purtse in the 1920s.
