= Laiuse Castle =

Castle in Estonia

Coordinates: 58°48′47″N 26°32′38″E

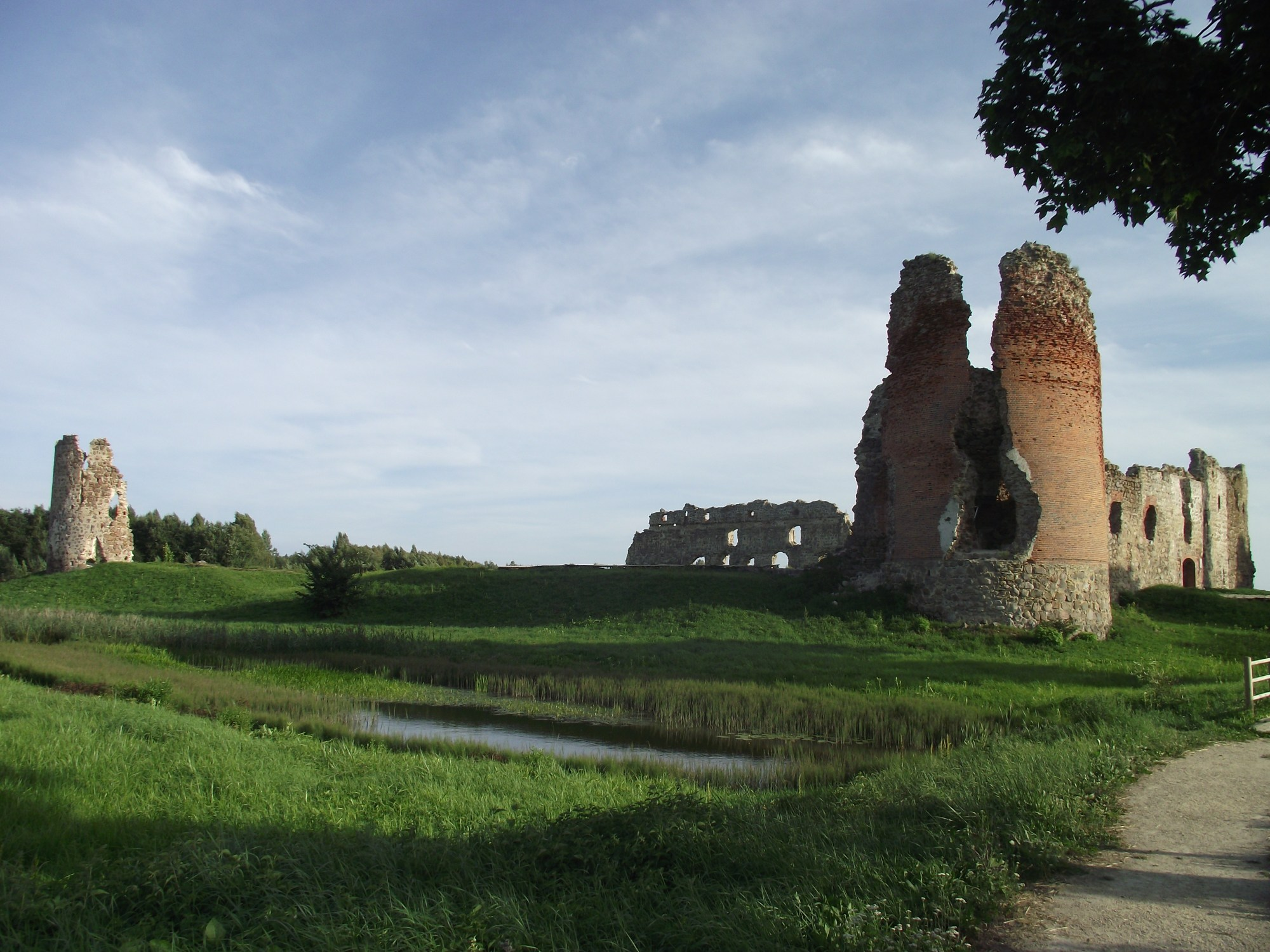
Laiuse Castle ruins in Laiusevälja

Drone video of Laiuse Castle

Laiuse Castle (Estonian: Laiuse ordulinnus, German: Burg Lais) was a Livonian Order castle in Laiusevälja, Jõgeva Parish, Estonia. The castle is now in ruins.

== History ==
Laiuse Castle was the first castle in Estonia built to cope with firearms. The oldest part of the castle was probably built in the end of 14th century by the Livonian Order. It was first mentioned in 1406.

In 1558 during the Livonian War the castle was conquered by Russian troops and badly damaged. During the Livonian War, in 1569, it was besieged twice by the Livonian Order under Gotthard Kettler. After the war, from 1582 it was part of Poland, known in Polish known as Lajs. King Stephen Báthory appointed Andrzej Orzechowski the starost of Lajs as a reward for his bravery in the Livonian War, and in 1589 King Sigismund III Vasa confirmed the appointment. Orzechowski rebuilt the castle, which was made the seat of the starosts. It was the seat of northernmost starostwo in the history of Poland. At the start of the Polish–Swedish War of 1600–1611, in 1600, the castle was besieged and captured by Sweden, but was restored to Poland the following year. In 1622, it de facto passed to Sweden, de iure in 1660.

During the Great Northern War, from 1700 to 1701, after the Battle of Narva, the Swedish king Charles XII established his winter quarters here. For five months Laiuse was the administrative center of Swedish Empire.

== See also ==
- List of castles in Estonia

== Gallery ==
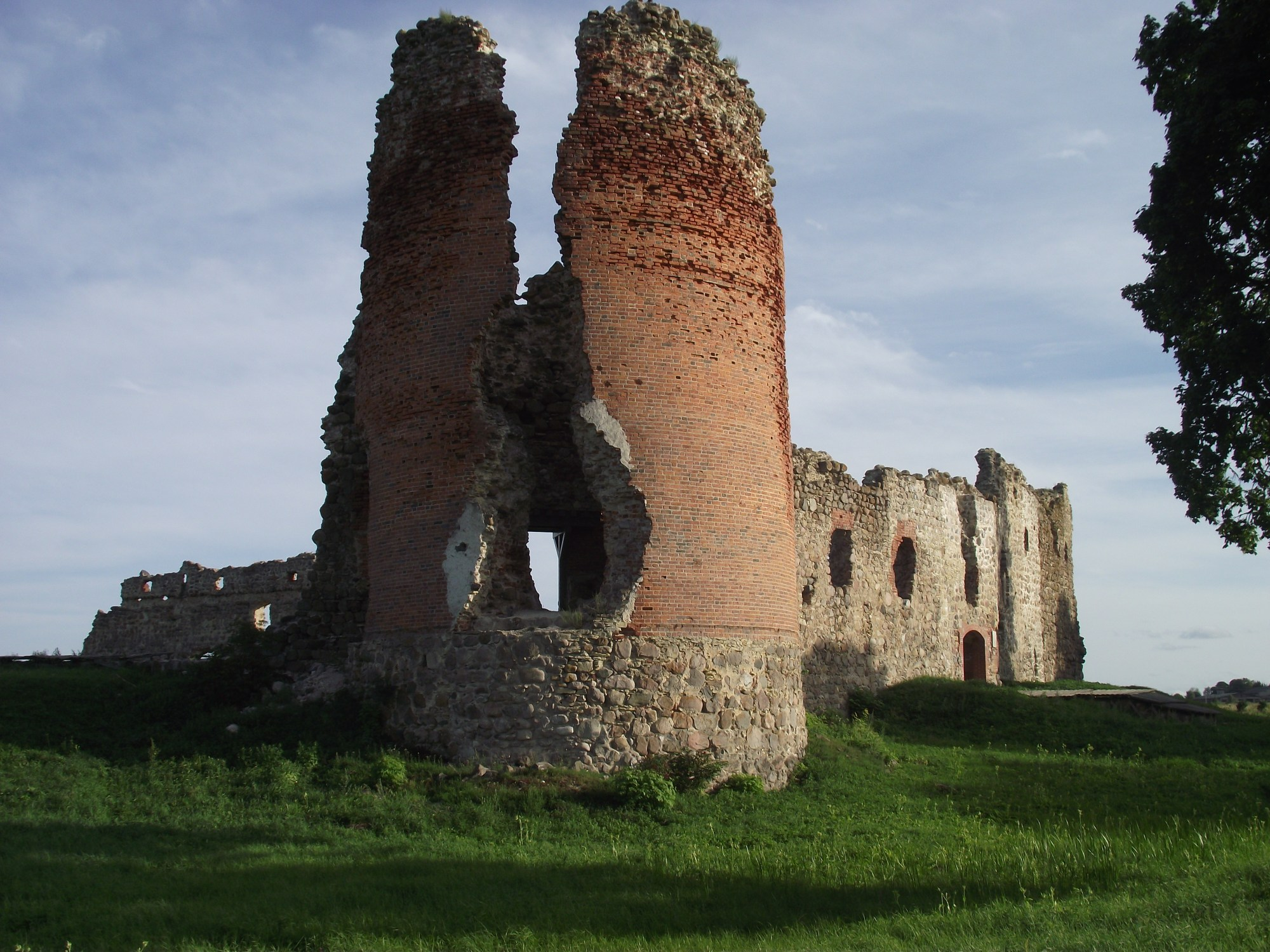

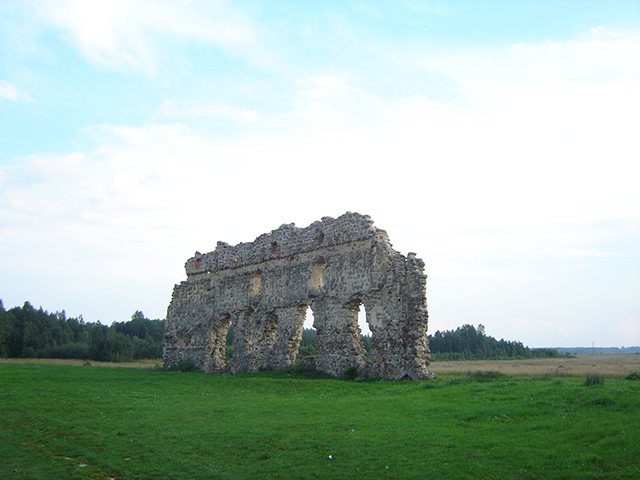

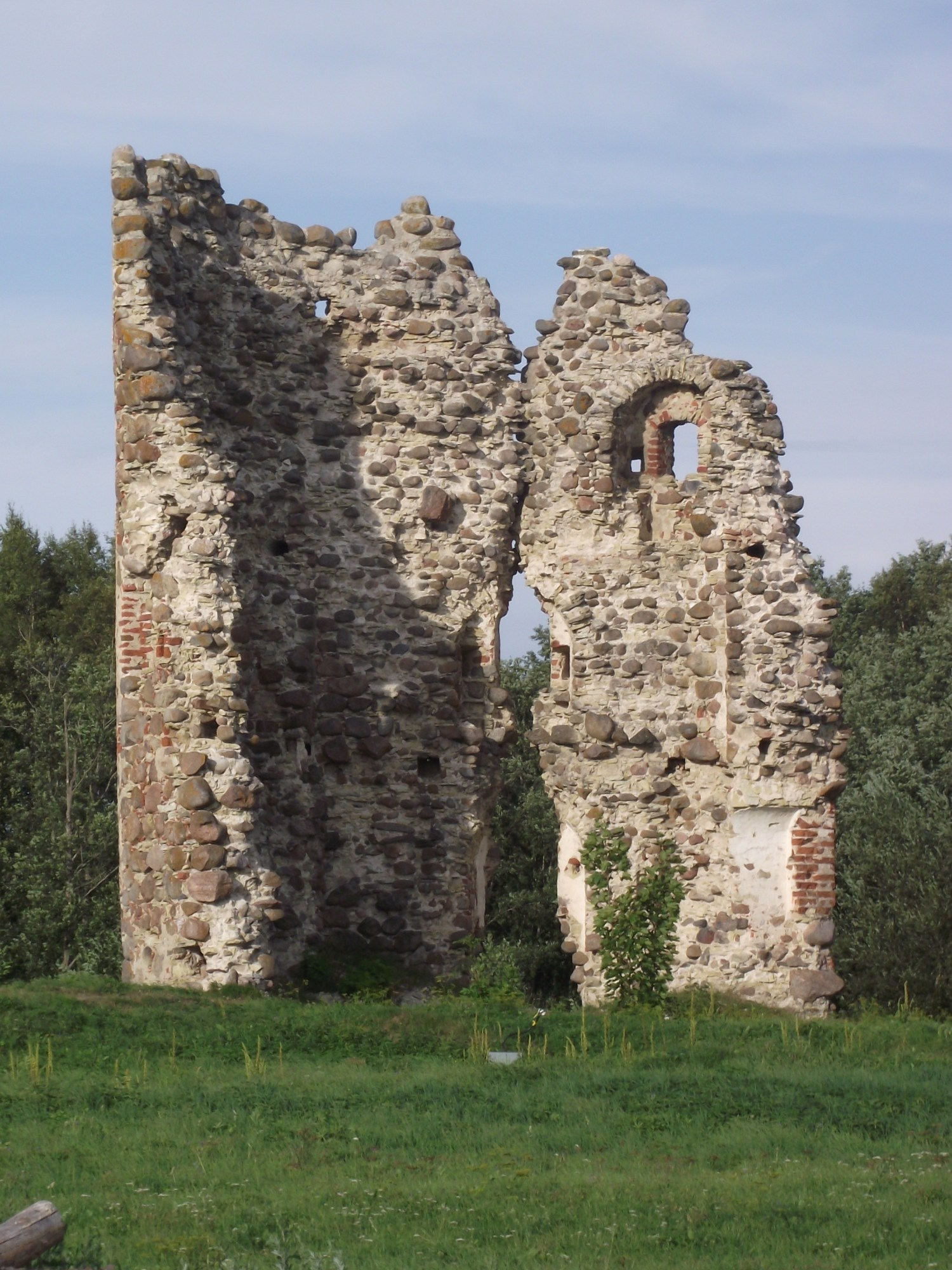

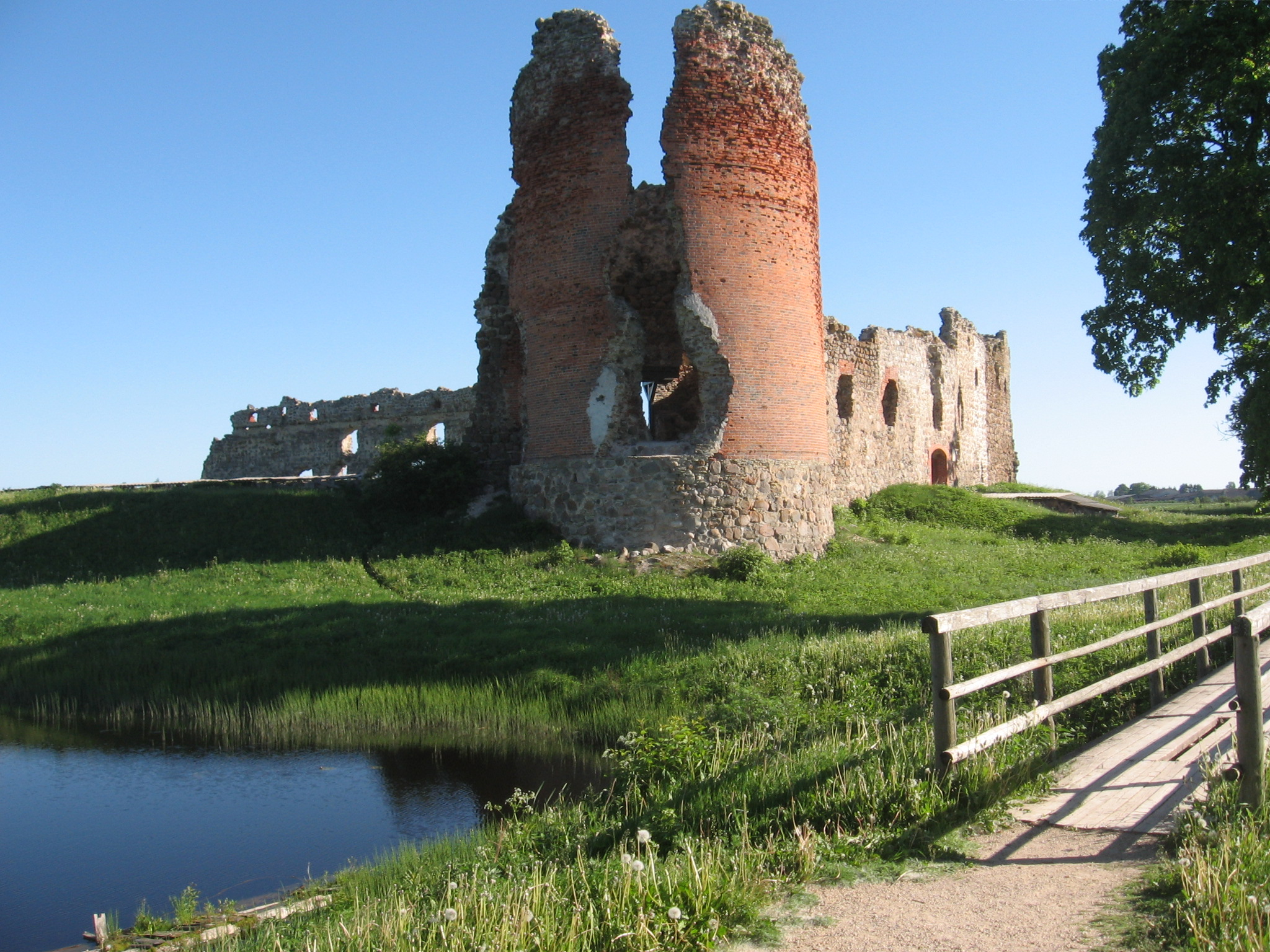

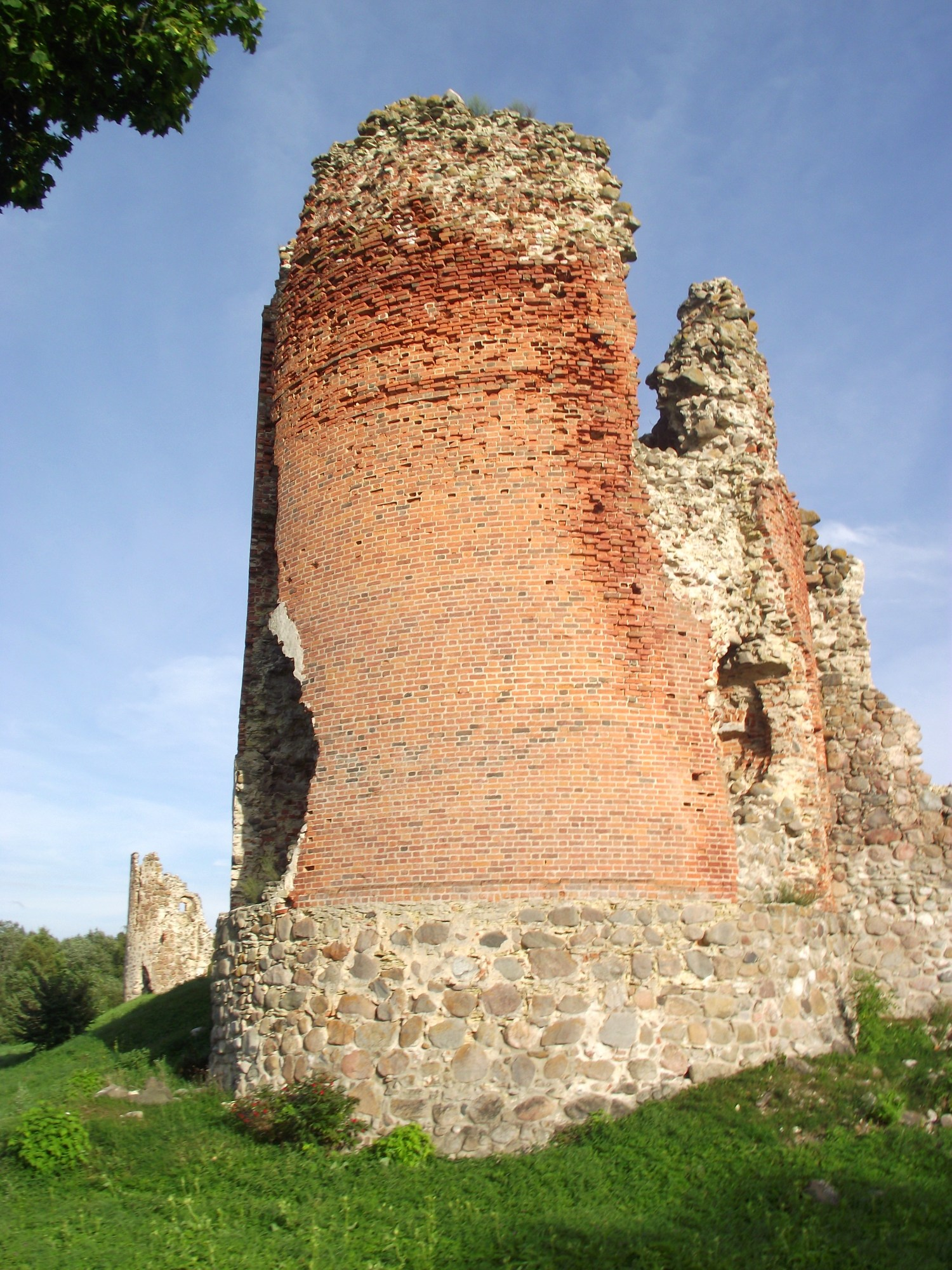

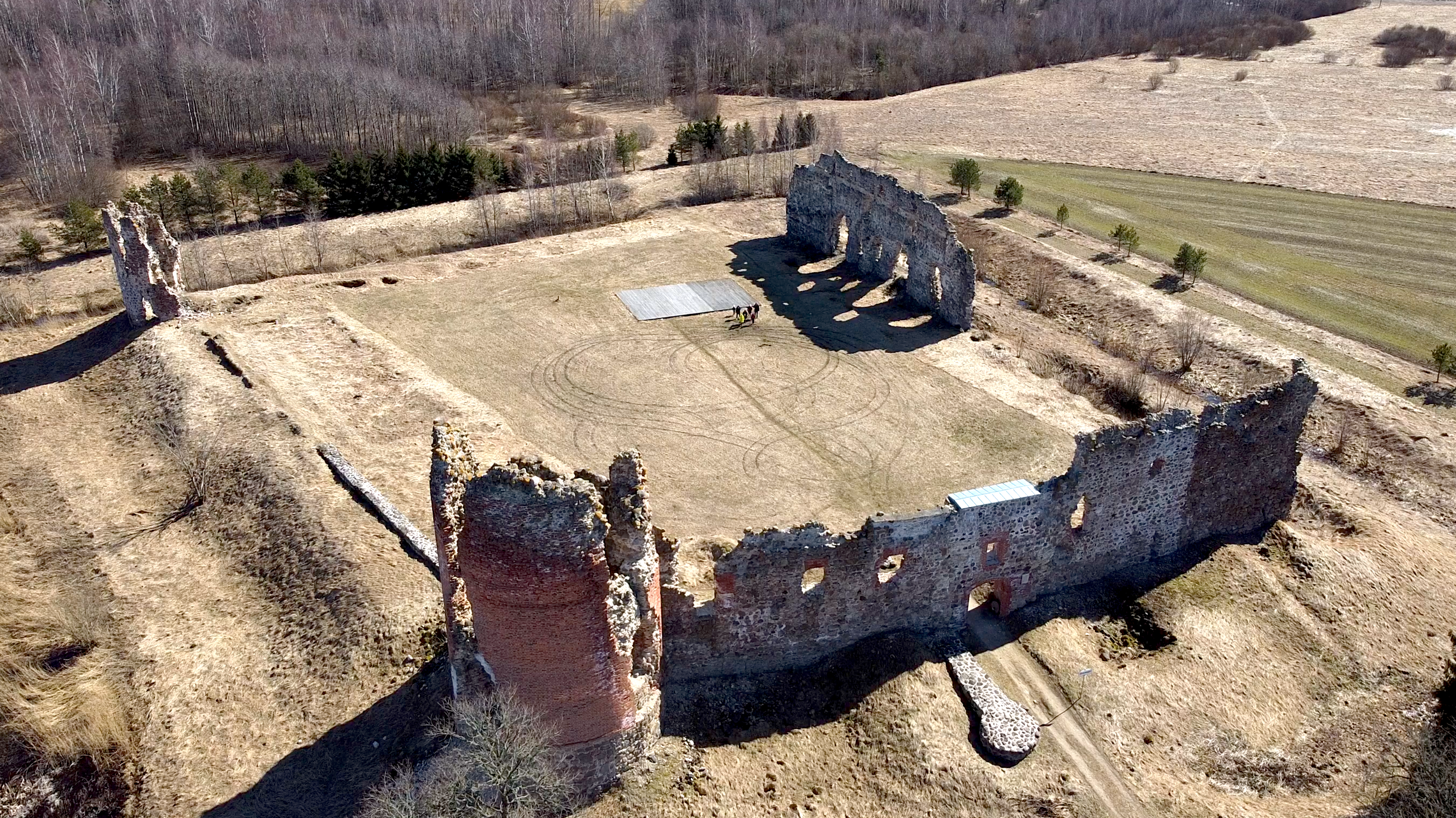
