= Otepää Castle =

Coordinates: 58.0573°N 26.5041°E

Otepää Castle was a stronghold of the Ugandi Estonians in Otepää, later controlled by the Bishop of Tartu and his vassals. Otepää Castle was one of the most prominent centers of ancient Estonia and a crucial hub in Southern Estonia, being one of Estonia's strongest ancient fortresses, located atop the highest hillfort in the region. The fortress remained in use for nearly a millennium, during which it witnessed bloody battles, was burned down multiple times, and rebuilt. The fortress lent its name to the town of Otepää and the parish of Otepää.

The fortress evolved from a settlement with natural fortifications, which permanently emerged on Otepää Hill in the middle of the 1st millennium. By the end of the Viking Age, Otepää Castle had become a prominent center with permanent settlement and during the Late Iron Age, its defensive structures were significantly reinforced. The settlement and trading post that developed around the fortress elevated Otepää as Ugandi's capital and underscored Otepää's significance. The wealth and influence of the nobles governing the fortress relied on long-distance trade and military traditions, as well as their power over the surrounding territories. Otepää Castle's rule may have encompassed most of Eastern Estonia. As the strongest fortress in southeastern Estonia, Otepää played a decisive role in the conflicts between ancient Estonians and Russians and Latgalians, and in the early 13th century, with the Crusaders as well.

Otepää Castle also played a significant role in the events of the ancient Estonian struggle for freedom, being one of the main centers of resistance against pagans, one of the main targets of Crusader and Russian military campaigns in Estonia, and the site of one of the most important victories over the Crusaders in 1217. Even after Christianization, the fortress retained its importance, immediately becoming a military and political stronghold for the Crusaders in southern Estonia. For a short period, Otepää Castle was also the seat of the Bishop of Estonia and the center of papal authority in the region. As part of the Bishopric of Tartu, Otepää Castle gradually diminished in importance due to competition with the Hanseatic city of Tartu, internal conflicts among landlords, and the development of firearms. In the first quarter of the 15th century, a large part of the fortress was destroyed by fire, after which it was not rebuilt.

The steep slopes of the hill made Otepää Castle one of the strongest fortifications in Ancient Estonia. The initial fortified settlement and later the main fortress were located on the highest plateau of the hill, 40 meters above the surrounding terrain. The lower plateau, which formed a suburb, was fortified 20 meters below the main plateau. During the final period of the ancient struggle for freedom, the fortress began to be rebuilt into a contemporary stone fortress, largely continuing old local building traditions. To this day, the lower part of the fortress walls in Romanesque style have been preserved, likely the oldest stone building in the entire Baltic region. The walls of the castle church, erected in the 13th century, have been excavated and preserved.

Otepää Castle is one of the most renowned archaeological sites in Estonia, whose ruins have been extensively studied by archaeologists since the 19th century. The most extensive excavations of medieval castles in Estonia have been carried out in Otepää, yielding the largest number of finds. The most distinguished researchers of Otepää Castle have been archaeologists Osvald Saadre and Ain Mäesalu. The artifact-rich cultural layer of Otepää Castle has provided significant additional knowledge about the prehistory and medieval period of Estonia and military history, with several finds being notable across Europe. Among the discoveries are a large number of arrowheads, items associated with ancient religion and Ugandi warlords, precious metal book adornments, Estonia's oldest wind instrument, and one of the oldest firearms in Northern Europe.
