= Purtse Castle =

Castle in Estonia

- Purtse mõis
- Ida-Viru County, Estonia
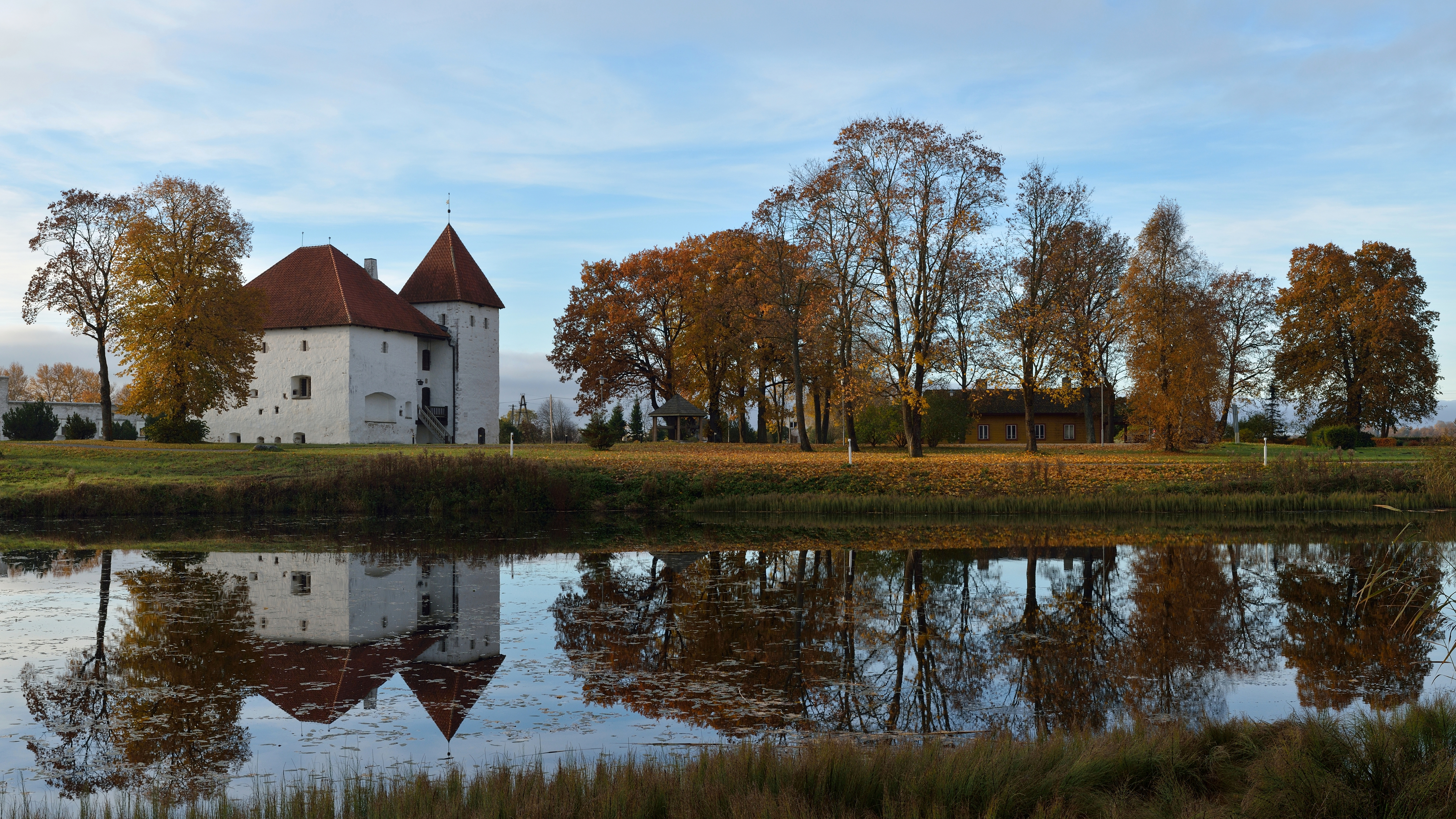

Site information
- Type: Fortified manor

Location
- Location of Purtse Castle in Estonia
- Location within Estonia
- Coordinates: 59.4190°N 27.0129°E

Site history
- Built: 16th century
- Built by: Johann von Taube

Purtse Castle (Estonian: Purtse mõis, German: Alt-Isenhof) is a castle of a local Purtse knight manor in Purtse, northeastern Estonia. It was built in the middle of the 16th century, probably by the landowner Johann von Taube, at a time when late Gothic ways of building were slowly being abandoned in favour of Renaissance ideas. The building therefore contains partly elements which were archaic even for its time, and partly examples of renaissance architecture.

== History ==
The castle was built as a fortified manor house, different from a purely defensive keep in that the floors have not only one but several rooms. It consists of three storeys: the lower was used for storage, the middle for living and the top floor had a defensive function. The building was entered on the second floor via a ladder which could, in times of danger, be pulled up. Inside, the basement contained a sophisticated hypocaust system which could be used for heating the main hall on the middle floor.

During the course of history, the castle has had several different owners, notably Henrik Fleming (1584–1650), Governor of Ingria, and the Baltic German von Stackelberg family. The castle has also seen many different uses, including a feudal home, a fortification, a cellar, a milk chamber, a grain storage, a prison and a workers' residence.

During its long history, the manor has also burnt down several times. After 1940 it was abandoned completely. The castle was restored in 1987–90. The building is under state protection in Estonia and listed in the National Registry of Cultural Monuments.

== Gallery ==
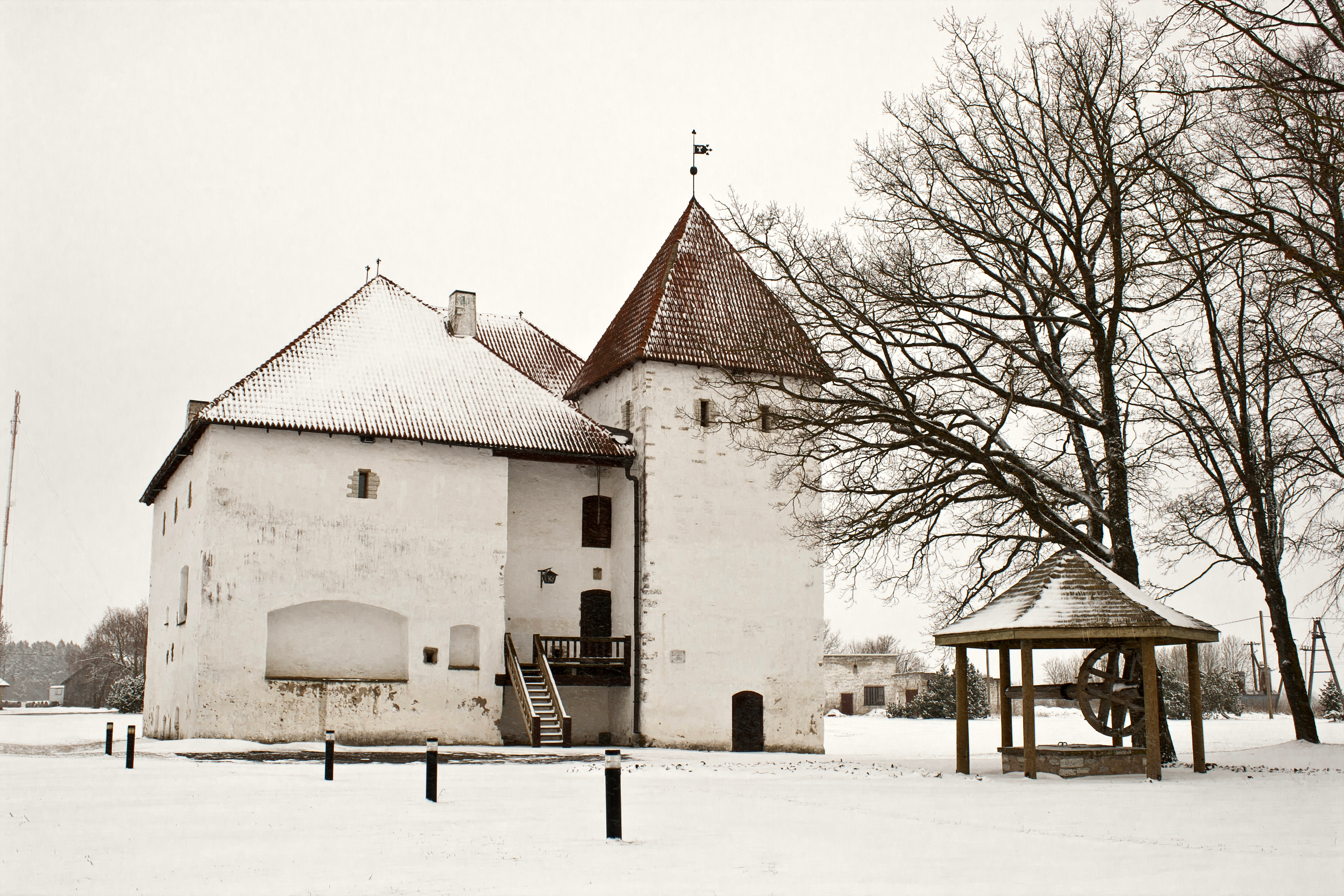

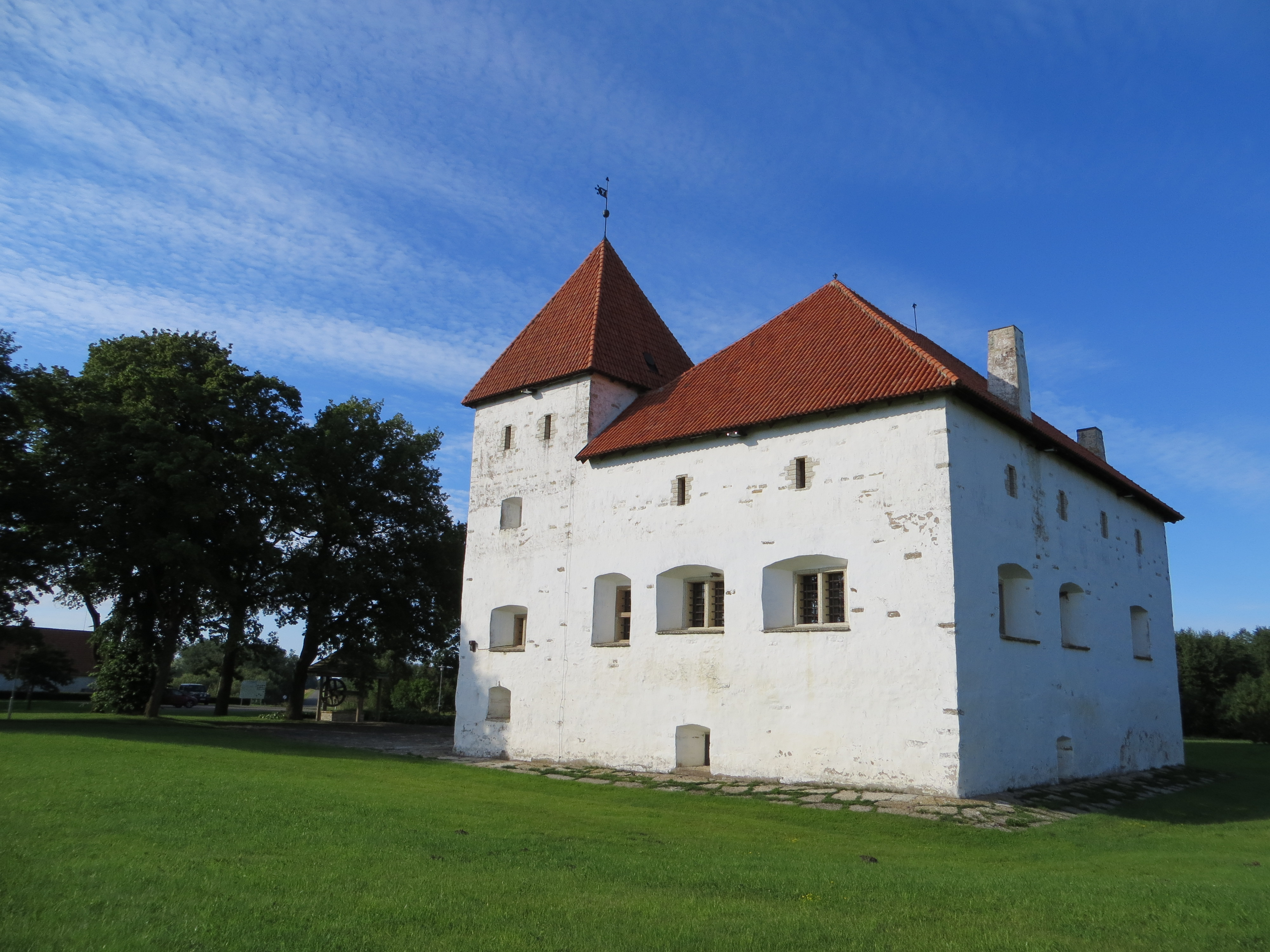

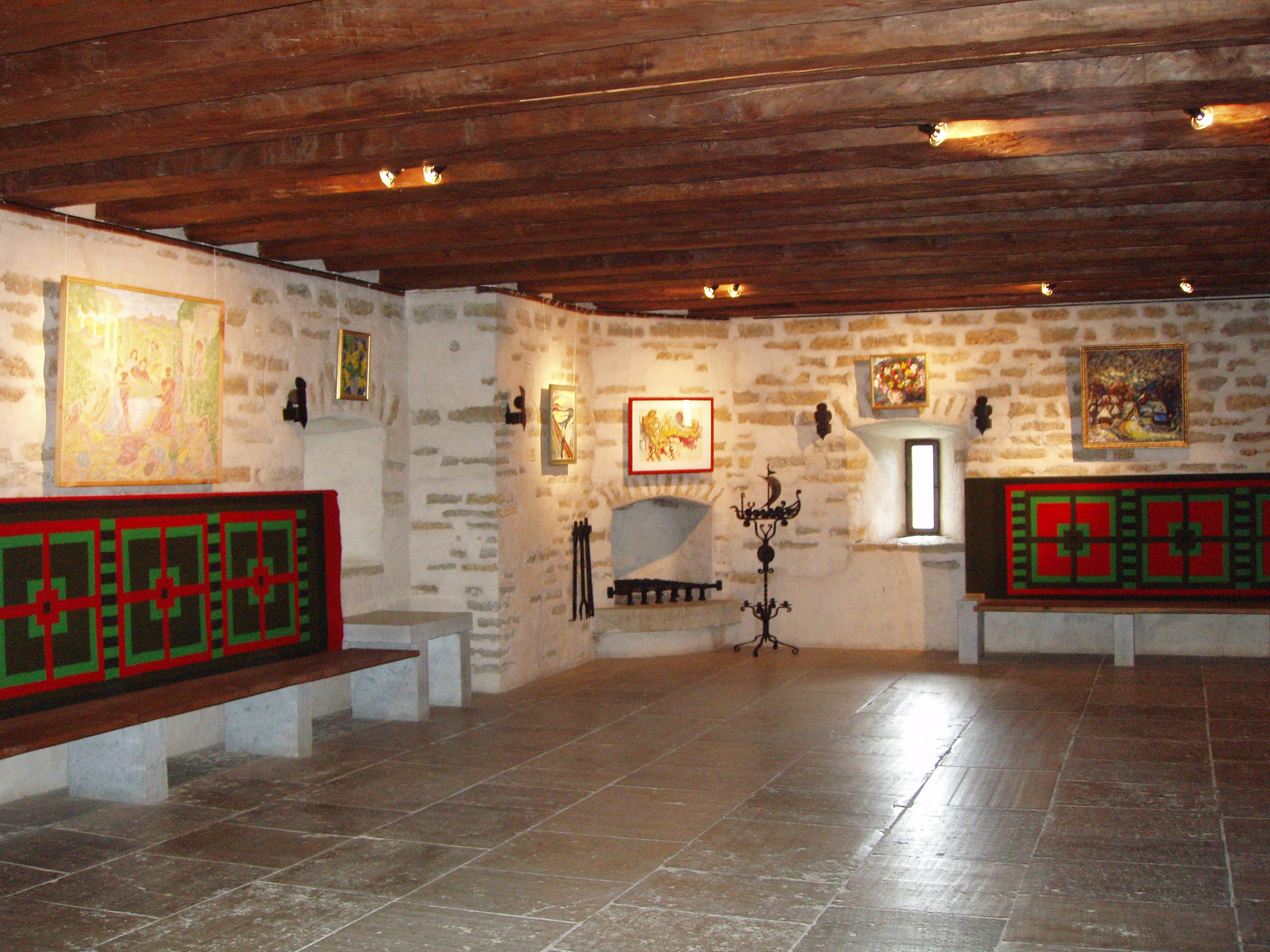

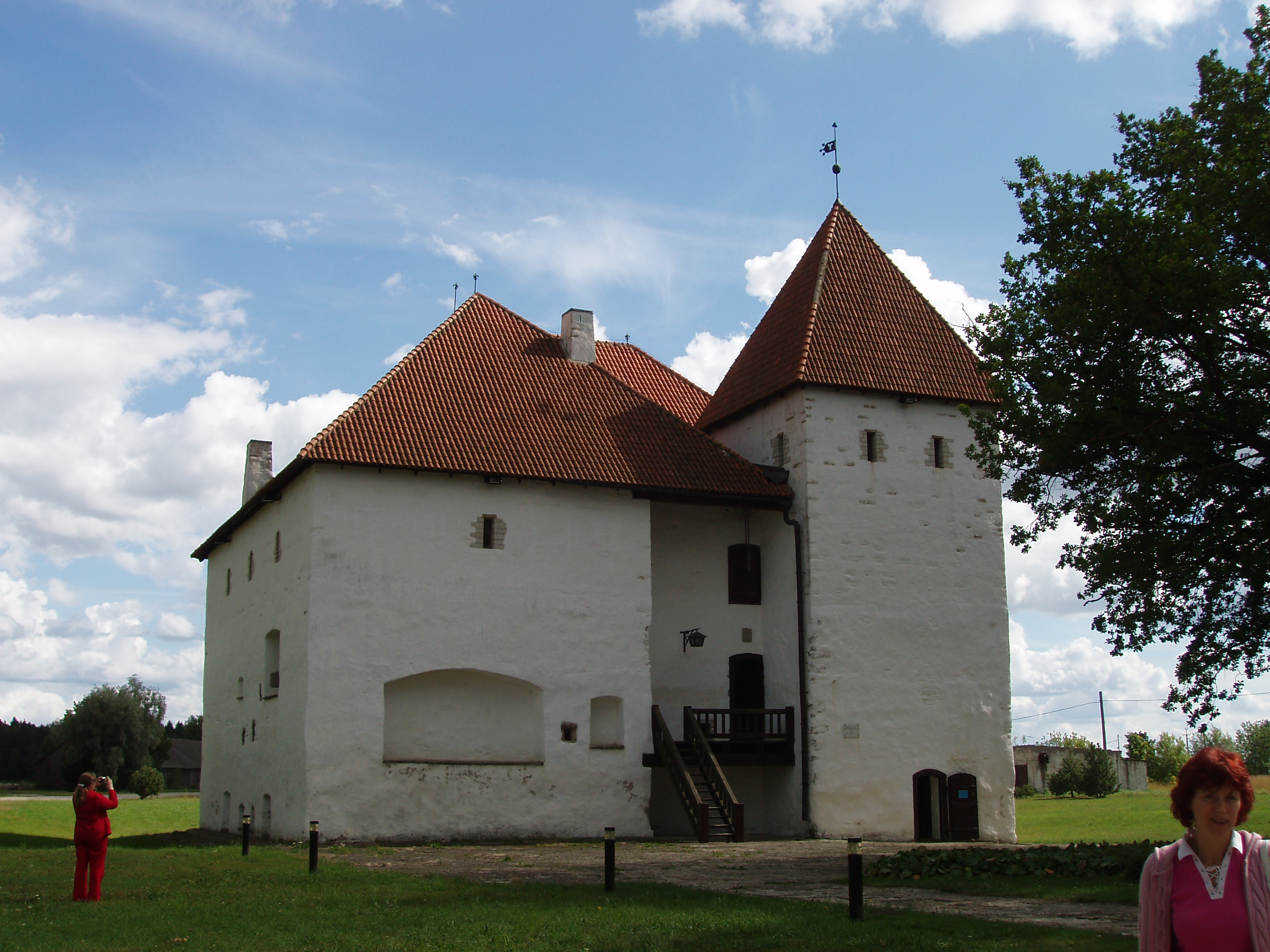

== See also ==
- List of castles in Estonia
