= List of palaces and manor houses in Estonia =

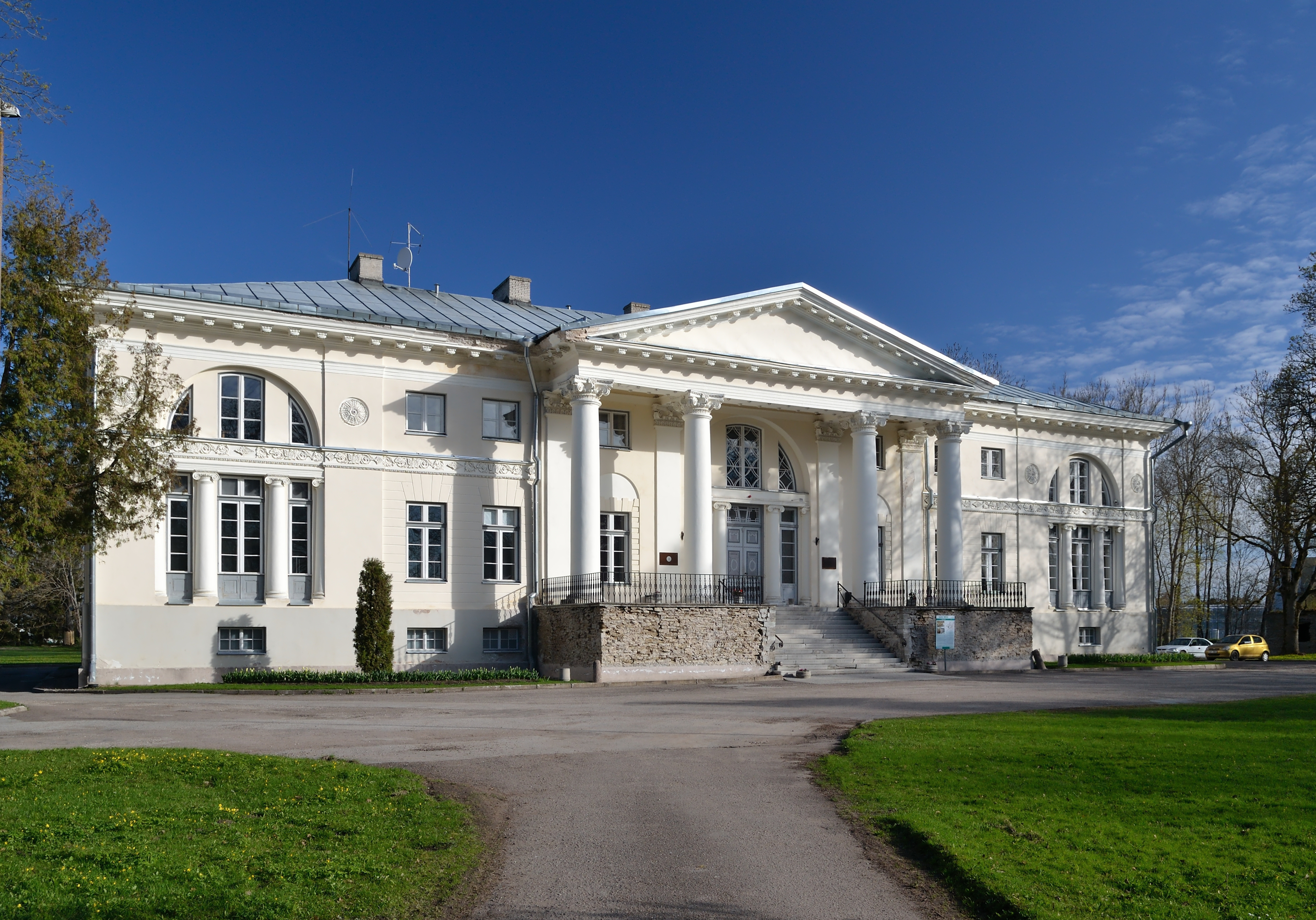
Saku manor house

This is a list of palaces and manor houses in Estonia. This list does not include castles, which are listed in a separate article. As there are at least 400 manor houses in Estonia, this list is incomplete.

== Palaces and manor houses in Estonia ==
Name	Name in German	Municipality (present)	County (present)	Established	Picture	Notes
Aa Manor	Haakhof	Lüganuse Parish	Ida-Viru County	1426		Initially an order manor. Later, the main owners of the manor were the Wangersheim, von Nascackin and von Gruenewald families. The present two-storey main building was constructed in the 1690s and reconstructed in the 18th and 19th centuries. Now an assisted living facility for the elderly.
Aakre Manor	Ayakar	Elva Parish	Tartu County	1557, or earlier		Associated with the Kawer, von Rehbinder and von Rohland families. Main building dates from the 19th century. Now houses a school.
Ääsmäe Manor	Essemäggi	Saue Parish	Harju County	1574		King John III of Sweden presented the estate as a gift to his secretary Johann Berends in 1574. Current building dates from the 1770s.
Aaspere Manor	Kattentack	Haljala Parish	Lääne-Viru County	1583		Main building erected at the end of the 18th century. Belonged to the von Dellingshausen family. Formerly an orphanage.
Aavere Manor	Afer	Väike-Maarja Parish	Lääne-Viru County	1765		Partially destroyed; belonged to the Tiesenhausen and von Harpe families.
Adavere Manor	Addafer	Põltsamaa Parish	Jõgeva County	17th century		Belonged to the von Stackelberg family, among others.
Ahja Manor	Aya	Põlva Parish	Põlva County	1553		Belonged to the Oxenstierna family and later, Johann Ernst Glück.
Alatskivi Castle	Allatzkiwwi	Peipsiääre Parish	Tartu County	16th century		Now partly houses the Eduard Tubin Museum.
Albu Manor	Alp	Järva Parish	Järva County	1282		Belonged to Gustaf Otto Douglas.
Alu Manor	Allo	Rapla Parish	Rapla County	1409		Belonged to the von Uexküll, Wrangel and Tiesenhausen families, among others.
Anija Manor	Annia	Anija Parish	Harju County	1482		Current building dates to 1802. Owned by the Stael von Holstein, von Ungern-Sternberg and von Wahl families. Currently a community centre and a library.
Annikvere Manor	Annigfer	Haljala Parish	Lääne-Viru County	1445, or earlier		The current main stone manor was erected at the end of the 18th century.
Ao Manor	Hackeweid	Järva Parish	Järva County	1559, or earlier		Birthplace of Estonian writer, medical doctor and philologist Friedrich Robert Faehlmann.
Arkna Manor	Arknal	Rakvere Parish	Lääne-Viru County	1527		Preserved at it was in the 1870s. Belonged to Julius von Schubert. School for agriculture from the 1920s until the 1980s.
Aruküla Manor (Järva County)	Arroküll	Järva Parish	Järva County	17th century		Belonged to Karl Wilhelm von Toll.
Aruküla manor (Harju County)	Arroküll	Raasiku Parish	Harju County	17th century		Belonged to the von Baranoff family. Now, a school.
Atla Manor	Groß-Attel	Rapla Parish	Rapla County	1422		Main manor dates from the late 1700s.
Avanduse Manor	Awandus	Väike-Maarja Parish	Lääne-Viru County	1494		Belonged to Friedrich von Lütke.
Ehmja Manor	Echmes	Lääne-Nigula Parish	Lääne County	1529		Established by Johhan Varnsbeke. Later belonged to Magnus Gabriel De la Gardie, Engelbrecht von Tiesenhausen, Christoph Heinrich Kursell, Friedrich Fromhold von Knorring, Friedrich Johann von Wartmann, Wilhelm Gustav von Essen, Charlotte von Ungern-Steinberg, and Alexander von Hoyningen-Huene. Now in ruins.
Eidapere Manor	Edaperre	Kehtna Parish	Rapla County	19th century		Burned down in 1930. Rebuilt in 1932 and operated as a schoolhose. Currently a dormitory.
Eivere Manor	Eyefer	Paide	Järva County	1552		Belonged to the von Stackelberg family. Main building constructed in 1912.
Ervita Manor	Erwita	Järva Parish	Järva County	1663		Belonged to Gotthard Johann von Knorring.
Esna Manor	Jerwen	Järva Parish	Järva County	1620s		The manor was named after the von Essen family. The main building was built in several renovations from the 18th-century to the 1880s. Later belonged to the von Gruenewald family for several generations.
Essu Manor	Jess	Haljala Parish	Lääne-Viru County	1496 or earlier		Belonged to the von Wrangell and von Ungern-Sternberg families.
Glehn Castle		Tallinn	Harju County	1886		Built and owned by Nikolai von Glehn.
Härgla Manor	Herküll	Rapla Parish	Rapla County	1516		Belonged to a succession of owners, including the von Uexküll and von Stackelberg families.
Harku Manor	Hark	Harku Parish	Harju County	1372 or earlier		Belonged to the Livonian Order during the Middle Ages. Later belonged to the von Uexküll, von Budberg and von Ungern-Sternberg families. Now houses the Institute of Experimental Biology.
Hatu Manor	Hattoküll	Lääne-Harju Parish	Harju County	1609		Belonged to the Wrangel family, birthplace of Ludwig August Mellin.
Heimtali Manor	Heimthal	Viljandi Parish	Viljandi County	1528		Main building rebuilt in the 1850s. Belonged to Peter Reinhold von Sivers, among others. Now a school.
Hellenurme Manor	Hellenorm	Elva Parish	Tartu County	1641		Belonged to the Wrangel family.
Helme Manor	Schloß Helmet	Tõrva Parish	Valga County	17th century		Belonged to the de la Gardie, Edler von Rennekampff and von Stryk families. Currently used as an agricultural school.
Holdre Manor	Hollershof	Tõrva Parish	Valga County	1597	.	Long associated with the noble von Ditmar family. The current main building was rebuilt around 1910 in the Art Nouveau style based on a design by Otto Wildau.
Hummuli Manor	Hummelshof	Tõrva Parish	Valga County	1470		Battle of Hummelshof fought nearby, Now, a school.
Hüüru Manor	Huer	Saue Parish	Harju County	1560		Originally, an auxiliary cattle manor of Harku Manor. Now houses the service point for Saue libraries and the Hüüru Village Society.
Illuka Manor	Illuck	Alutaguse Parish	Ida-Viru County	1657		Current main building completed in 1888. Currently houses a school.
Illuste Manor	Illust	Lääneranna Parish	Pärnu County	1646		Owned by the von Maydell family. Current Heimat-style manor designed by Otto Wildau in 1912. Today, used by the Tallinn Sports School.
Imastu Manor	Mönnikorb	Tapa Parish	Lääne-Viru County	1447		Belonged to the von Rehbinder family for several centuries. At later dates was used as a care home for disabled children, veterans and the elderly. Now privately owned.
Ingliste Manor	Haehl	Kehtna Parish	Rapla Parish	1526, or earlier		Belonged to the von Anrep family in the Middle Ages. Later belonged to the von Staal family for several generations. Current main building dates from c. 1760.
Inju Manor	Innis	Vinni Parish	Lääne-Viru County	1520		Current building dates from 1894. Possibly designed by architect Rudolf von Engelhardt.
Jägala Manor	Jaggowal	Jõelähtme Parish	Harju County	1424		Manor was property of Brevern noble family.
Jälgimäe Manor	Jelgimeggi	Saku Parish	Harju County	1656		Birthplace of Nikolai von Glehn (who later built Glehn Castle) in the 19th century.
Jäneda Manor	Jendel	Tapa Parish	Lääne-Viru County	before 1510		Present building was constructed between 1913 and 1915 when owned by the von Benkendorff family. Later belonged to Moura Budberg. Now houses the Jäneda Study and Counselling Centre, musical observatory, conference center, museum and a pub.
Järlepa Manor	Jerlep	Rapla Parish	Rapla County	1688		Belonged to August von Kotzebue.
Joosu Manor	Waimel-Neuhof	Põlva Parish	Põlva County	1731		Destroyed.
Jootme Manor	Jotma	Tapa Parish	Lääne-Viru County	17th century		Belonged to the von Wrangell and von Maydell families. The current two-storey classical wooden building was completed in 1859.
Kaagjärve Manor	Kawershof	Valga Parish	Valga County	1541, or earlier		Belonged to the Kawer, Golovin, von Brüggen and von Grote families. The Neo-Renaissance main building was constructed in the 1850s. Now operating as a schoolhouse.
Kaagvere Manor	Kawershof	Kastre Parish	Tartu County	1544, or earlier		Associated with the Kawer family initially. Was an orphanage in the 1930s–1940s.
Kabala Manor	Kabbal	Türi Parish	Järva County	1638		Owned by the von Uexküll family.
Kadriorg Palace	Catherinethal	Tallinn	Harju County	1718		Houses part of the Art Museum of Estonia's collection of foreign artwork.
Kaelase Manor	Kailes	Põhja-Pärnumaa Parish	Pärnu County	1665		Belonged to the von Derfelden and von Brandt families. Partially destroyed in 1905, rebuilt. Now a schoolhouse.
Käesalu Manor	Kaesal	Lääne-Harju Parish	Harju County	17th century		The main was building erected between the 1760s and 1790s. Partial ruins.
Kaiavere Manor	Kayafer	Tartu Parish	Tartu County	1417, or earlier		Belonged to a series of noble families, beginning with Otto von Uexküll. Currently in ruins.
Kalvi Manor	Pöddes	Viru-Nigula Parish	Lääne-Viru County	1485		Belonged to the von Essen and von Stackelberg families.
Kammeri Manor	Duckershof	Kambja Parish	Tartu County	16th century		Demolished; birthplace of Gregor von Helmersen.
Käravete Manor	Kerrafer in Kirchspiel Ampel	Järva Parish	Järva County	17th century		Belonged to the von Baggehufwudt, von Rehbinder, von Wrangell and von Staal families at various times.
Kärstna Manor	Kerstenshof	Viljandi Parish	Viljandi County	1678		Belonged to Joseph Carl von Anrep.
Käru Manor	Kerro	Türi Parish	Järva County	18th century		Birthplace of Ragnar Nurkse; belonged to Karl von Ditmar.
Kasti Manor	Kasty	Saaremaa Parish	Saare County	16th century		Belonged to a series of Baltic-German families, including the Möller, von Sass, von Güeldenstubbe, and von Buxhoeveden families. Now in ruins.
Kastre Manor	Kaster	Kastre Parish	Tartu County	17th century		Associated with the Oxenstierna, von Schwengeln and von Essen families. Currently houses a nursing home.
Keava Manor	Kedenpäh	Kehtna Parish	Rapla County	1480		Associated with the von Staal, von Rosen, von Lilienfeld and von Fersen families. The Early-Classical main building was erected in about 1780 and burned in 1905. Restored, it was later damaged again in the 1950s. Currently in ruins.
Kehra Manor	Kedder	Anija Parish	Harju County	1624		Belonged to the Bade, Elvering, von Maydell and von Ullrich families. The wooden early-Classical main building was constructed in about 1820 and was partly rebuilt in the 20th century. Currently, privately owned.
Kehtna Manor	Kechtel	Kehtna Parish	Rapla County	1470		Belonged to the Beckendorff and Lilienfeld families, among others.
Keila Manor	Kegel in Kirchspiel Kegel	Keila	Harju County	1433		Now houses the Harjumaa Museum.
Keila-Joa Manor	Schloss Fall	Lääne-Harju Parish	Harju County	17th century		Belonged to Alexander von Benckendorff.
Kernu Manor	Kirna	Saue Parish	Harju County	1637		The current manor house dates from the end of the 18th century and is believed to have been designed by architect Ludwig Engel.
Kiikla Manor	Kiekel	Alutaguse Parish	Ida-Viru County	17th century		Belonged to the von Rosen and von Dehn families. Currently, a children's home.
Kiiu Manor	Kida	Kuusalu Parish	Harju County	1348		Owned by the von Tiesenhausen, de la Gardie and von Stenbock families. The current, Art Nouveau main building dates from the beginning of the 20th century. Currently houses the Kuusalu Parish local government.
Kiltsi Manor	Schloß Ass	Väike-Maarja Parish	Lääne-Viru County	1466		Belonged to Adam Johann von Krusenstern.
Kiltsi Manor	Weissenfeld	Haapsalu				
Kirna Manor	Kirna	Türi Parish	Järva County	1614		Belonged to the Osten-Sacken family, among others.
Kiviloo Manor	Fegefeuer	Raasiku Parish	Harju County	1413		Current building dates from between 1906 and 1910. Owned by the von Stackelberg family.
Kloodi Manor	Peuth	Rakvere Parish	Lääne-Viru County	17th century		Built by the Clodt von Jürgensburg family.
Klooga Manor	Lodensee	Lääne-Harju Parish	Harju County	1604, or earlier		Belonged to the Nieroths, Lohns, Klugens and von Krusensterns. Later used by the Soviet Strategic Rocket Forces. Partially in ruins.
Kodasoo Manor	Kotzum	Kuusalu Parish	Harju County	1485, or earlier		Belonged to the von Tiesenhausen and Stael von Holstein families.
Kodijärve Manor	Gothensee	Kambja Parish	Tartu County	17th century		Belonged to the von Brackel and von Ackermann families. Now a care home for the elderly.
Kohala Manor	Tolks	Rakvere Parish	Lääne-Viru County	1880s		First manor house dates from 1489, current manor house dates from the 1880s. Belonged to the von Wrangells, von Lodes, von Ungern-Sternbergs, among others.
Kohila Manor	Koil	Kohila Parish	Rapla County	1438		Belonged to the Wrangel family, among others.
Kõima Manor	Kaima	Pärnu	Pärnu County	c. 1800		Long associated with the noble von Ditmar family.
Kõltsu Manor	Wellenhof	Lääne-Harju Parish	Harju County	19th century		Belonged to the von Uexküll family.
Kolu Manor	Kollo	Türi Parish	Järva County	1639		Associated with von Grotenhjelm, von Middendorff and von Schilling families. The main building was erected in 1890 and restored in its original form after looting in 1905. Currently in private possession.
Kõljala Manor	Kölljall	Saaremaa Parish	Saare County	1250		Belonged to the Buxhoeveden and Osten-Sacken families.
Kolga Manor	Kolk	Kuusalu Parish	Harju County	1230		Birthplace of Estonian wrestler Aleksander Aberg.
Kõo Manor	Wolmarshof	Põhja-Sakala Parish	Viljandi County	1670s		Initially belonged to the von Wrangell family.
Koogu Manor	Kook	Viru-Nigula Parish	Lääne-Viru County	1685, or earlier		Originally owned by the von Liphart family, then by a succession of other prominent Baltic-German families, including the von Wrangel, von Rosen and von Essen families. Currently in ruins.
Koonga Manor	Kokenkau	Lääneranna Parish	Pärnu County	1449, or earlier		Belonged to the Bishopric of Ösel–Wiek. Now houses a post office.
Koordi Manor	Kirrisaar	Paide	Järva County	1485, or earlier		Belonged to various Baltic German noble families.
Kose Manor	Kosch	Jõelähtme Parish	Harju County	1790		A small manor belonging to the Koch family until 1939.
Kose-Uuemõisa Manor	Neuenhof	Kose Parish	Harju County	1340s		In the Middle Ages, a fortified manor was erected by the von Taube family. Later, belonged to the von Tiesenhausen and von Uexküll families. Now, a school.
Kostivere Manor	Kostifer	Jõelähtme Parish	Harju County	1379, or earlier		Main manor building was redesigned and built between 1770 and 1780.
Kõue Manor	Kau	Kose Parish	Harju County	1241		Belonged to Otto von Kotzebue.
Kriimani Manor	Brinkenhof	Kastre Parish	Tartu County	1582, or earlier		Current main wooden manor building was constructed in the 19th century. Originally belonged to the Brinkenhof family. Later owners included the von Löwenstern, von Kawer, von Gavel, von Boettiger, von Rosen, von Blanckenhagen, and the von Stryk families. After the Estonian War of Independence, the manor was given to Estonian military general Aleksander Paldrok.
Kudina Manor	Kudding	Jõgeva Parish	Jõgeva County	1447, or earlier		Belonged to the Taube family.
Kuigatsi Manor	Löwenhof	Otepää Parish	Valga County	1509		Belonged to the Dumpian, Dücker, von Löwenstern and von Nolcken families.
Kukruse Manor	Kuckers	Toila Parish	Ida-Viru County	1453		Belonged to Eduard Toll.
Kukulinna Manor	Kuckulin	Tartu Parish	Tartu County	1553		Belonged to the von Löwenwolde, von Koskull and von Löwenstern families. Current main wooden building erected in the late 19th century.
Kulina Manor	Kullina	Vinni Parish	Lääne-Viru County	1546, or earlier		Belonged to Arthur von Kirchten prior to 1919. Formerly a schoolhouse. Currently belongs to politician and entrepreneur Anti Poolamets.
Kumna Manor	Kumna	Harku Parish	Harju County	17th century		Belonged to the Knopiuse, Lübken, von Kosküll and von Meyendorff families.
Kunda Manor	Kunda	Viru-Nigula Parish	Lääne-Viru County	1443, or earlier		Belonged to the von Möller, von Schwenghelm and Girard de Soucanton families. Main manor is currently in ruins, with some manor administrative buildings preserved.
Kuremaa Manor	Jensel	Jõgeva Parish	Jõgeva County	16th century		Main building dates from 1853. Belonged to the von Oettingen family, among others. Now a vocational school.
Kurisoo Manor	Kurrisal	Järva Parish	Järva County	1585		Belonged to the von Mohrehschildt and von Staal families. Currently the Aravete Village Museum.
Kurista Manor	Kurrista	Kastre Parish	Tartu County	18th century		Long associated with the de Villebois family.
Kurtna Manor	Kurtna	Alutaguse Parish	Ida-Viru County	1480		Present building dates from the second half of the 19th century.
Kuusiku Manor	Saage	Rapla Parish	Rapla County	1467, or earlier		Belonged to the Wrangel family, among others
Lahmuse Manor	Lachmes	Põhja-Sakala Parish	Viljandi County	1593		Long associated with the von Kruedener family. Presently houses a school.
Laitse Manor	Laitz	Saue Parish	Harju County	1630		Belonged to the von Uexküll family, among others.
Lasila Manor	Lassila	Rakvere Parish	Lääne-Viru County	17th century		Connected to the life of Karl Ernst von Baer.
Laupa Manor	Laupa	Türi Parish	Järva County	17th century		Originally owned by the Taube family; current building was designed architect Jacques Rosenbaum in 1910 and completed in 1913.
Leetse Manor	Leetz	Lääne-Harju Parish	Harju County	17th century		Destroyed by a fire in 1993.
Lehmja Manor	Rosenhagen	Rae Parish	Harju County	1630s		Built by Bogislaus von Rosen. Later belonged to Pontus von Knorring. Renovated between 2005 and 2006.
Lehtse Manor	Lechts	Tapa Parish	Lääne-Viru County	1467		Ruined.
Lihula Manor	Schloß Leal	Lääneranna Parish	Pärnu County	1600s		Newer manor building dates to the 19th century.
Liigvalla Manor	Löwenwolde	Väike-Maarja Parish	Lääne-Viru County	Middle Ages		Originally owned by Kärkna Abbey. Later owned by the von Rehbinder and von Schilling families.
Lohu Manor	Loal	Kohila Parish	Rapla County	1620		Belonged to by Estonian military commander Johan Pitka in the 1920s.
Loona Manor	Kadvel/Klausholm	Saaremaa Parish	Saare County	1480		Located in Vilsandi National Park.
Luke Manor	Lugden	Nõo Parish	Tartu County	1557, possibly earlier		Destroyed.
Lustivere Manor	Lustifer	Põltsamaa Parish	Jõgeva County	1552		Owned by the von Wolff, von Samson-Himmelstjerna and von Wahl families. Now, a care home for the elderly.
Luua Manor	Ludenhof	Jõgeva Parish	Jõgeva County	1519		Birthplace of Arthur von Oettingen.
Maardu Manor	Maart	Jõelähtme Parish	Harju County	1397		Belonged to the von Fersen, Bohn and von Brevern families. Main manor was constructed according to the drawings of Jacob Stael von Holstein in the 1660s.
Maarjamäe Manor	Marienberg	Tallinn	Harju County	17th century		Houses one part of the Estonian History Museum.
Mäetaguse Manor	Mehntack	Alutaguse Parish	Ida-Viru County	1542		Belonged to the Wrangel family among others.
Maidla Manor (Ida-Viru County)	Wrangelstein	Lüganuse Parish	Ida-Viru County	1465		Belonged to the Taube family, the von Fersen family and von Maydell family, among others.
Maidla Manor (Rapla County)	Maidel	Rapla Parish	Rapla County	1452		Belonged to the Wrangel family.
Malla Manor	Malla	Viru-Nigula Parish	Lääne-Viru County	1443		Was owned by Gustav Horn, Count of Pori in the 17th century; current building dates from the 1880s.
Mäo Manor	Mexhof	Paide	Järva County	16th century		Partially destroyed; previously owned by Lennart Torstensson, the von Stackelberg family and the von Essen family.
Meeri Manor	Meyershof	Nõo Parish	Tartu County	16th century		Belonged to the Meyer, Boye, von Zalusky and von Seydlitz families.
Mõdriku Manor	Mödders	Vinni Parish	Lääne-Viru County	1470		Belonged to Alexander Kaulbars.
Mõigu Manor	Moik	Rae Parish	Harju County	1670		Knight's manor that was initially an auxiliary manor of Rae Manor. Donated by the estate of Catherine the Great to St. Mary's Cathedral, Tallinn at the end of the 18th century and used as a church manor of the cathedral congregation until the early 20th century. Now a reconstructed block of flats.
Mooste Manor	Moisekatz	Põlva Parish	Põlva County	16th century		Founded by the von Nolcken family.
Munalaskme Manor	Munnalas	Saue Parish	Harju County	17th century		Associated with the von Ullrich and von Hueck families. Now mostly in ruins.
Muraste Manor	Morras	Harku Parish	Harju County	1620s		Partially destroyed by a fire in 2001. In ruins.
Muuga Manor	Münkenhof	Vinni Parish	Lääne-Viru County	16th century		Belonged to painter Carl Timoleon von Neff.
Nabala Manor	Nappel	Kiili Parish	Harju County	1510, or earlier		Originally a Cistercian nunnery. Current building dates from the 19th century.
Neeruti Manor	Buxhoewden	Kadrina Parish	Lääne-Viru County	1412		In ruins. Belonged to the von Rehbinder family.
Nõmmküla Manor	Nömmküll	Tapa Parish	Lääne-Viru County	17th century		In ruins. Current wooden manor built between 1850 and 1860. Now privately owned.
Norra Manor	Kaltenborn	Järva Parish	Järva County	1569		Partially destroyed.
Nurme Manor	Nurms	Saue Parish	Harju County	1670s		Associated with the von Ullrich and von Mohrenschildt families. The main building was completed in 1789 and burnt down in 1980.
Ohtu Manor	Ocht	Lääne-Harju Parish	Harju County	1620s		Owned by the von Kursell family and others.
Õisu Manor	Euseküll	Mulgi Parish	Viljandi County	16th century		Long associated with the von Siver family. Now a vocational school.
Olustvere Manor	Ollustfer	Põhja-Sakala Parish	Viljandi County	16th century		Partially rebuilt at the end of the 19th century while owned by the von Fersen family. Current two-storey main manor completed in 1903. Now houses a tourist information centre and a kindergarten.
Ontika Manor	Ontika	Toila Parish	Ida-Viru County	17th century		Owned by the von Knorring, von Wrangell and von Clapier de Colongue families.
Oru Palace	Orrenhof	Toila Parish	Ida-Viru County	1899		Destroyed.
Oti Manor	Peudehof	Saaremaa Parish	Saare County	1309, possibly earlier		Preserved as it appeared in the 1850s.
Päärdu Manor	Kosch	Märjamaa Parish	Rapla County	16th century		Established by the von Uexküll family, later acquired by the Taube family. Used as a school from the 1920s until the early 1970s. Now privately owned.
Pädaste Manor	Peddast	Muhu Parish	Saare County	16th century		Now a luxury hotel, spa and restaurant.
Padise Manor	Padis-Kloster	Lääne-Harju Parish	Harju County	1780		Currently a boutique hotel and restaurant, owned and operated by the original family, the von Ramm family.
Pajaka Manor	Pajak	Märjamaa Parish	Rapla County	1452, or earlier		Belonged to the von Taube, von Wrangell, von Zoeg, von Lueder, von Knorring and von Mohrenschildt families at various times. Purchased by Peter von Stackelberg in 1808.
Paju Manor	Luhde-Großhof	Valga Parish	Valga County	1748		The Battle of Paju, during the Estonian War of Independence took place in 1919 around the manor.
Pajusi Manor	Pajus	Põltsamaa Parish	Jõgeva County	17th century		Presented to Heinrich von Fick in 1721 by Peter the Great, a state adviser, for his military services. From 1820 the manor belonged to the Wahl family. Currently a community center.
Palmse Manor	Palms	Haljala Parish	Lääne-Viru County	Middle Ages		Belonged to the von der Pahlen family. Located in Lahemaa National Park.
Palurpera Manor	Palloper	Elva Parish	Tartu County	1582		Owned by the von Ducker, von Rennenkampff, von Samson and the von Bruiningk families. Now, a school.
Pärsti Manor	Neu-Perst	Viljandi Parish	Viljandi County	16th century		Belonged to the von Engelhardt, von Below, von Stryk and Clapier de Colongue families. Main wooden manor dates from 1872.
Penijõe Manor	Pennijöggi	Lääneranna Parish	Pärnu County	17th century		Located in Matsalu National Park.
Piiskopi Manor	Bischofshof	Tartu	Tartu County	1627		Located in what is now Forselius Park. Bengt Gottfried Forselius founded teachers' seminary for Estonian boys at the manor in the 17th century. Now destroyed.
Pikajärve Manor	Langensee	Kanepi Parish	Põlva County	1749		Belonged to the Schreiterfeld and Mueller families.
Pikavere Manor	Pickfer	Raasiku Parish	Harju County	1446		Rebuilt in 1939. Currently used as a schoolhouse.
Pirgu Manor	Pirk	Rapla Parish	Rapla County	1662		Owned by the von Staal family. Main building was completed in the 1820s. Restored in the 1980s.
Põlgaste Manor	Poelcks	Kanepi Parish	Põlva County	1628		Associated with the Rothausen, von Roth and the von Oettingen families.
Polli Manor	Pollenhof	Mulgi Parish	Viljandi County	1720		Formerly owned by the von Stryk family. Now privately owned.
Põlula Manor	Poll	Vinni Parish	Lääne-Viru County	1489, or earlier		Belonged to various Baltic-German families. Now houses a school.
Pööravere Manor	Pörafer	Põhja-Pärnumaa Parish	Pärnu County	unknown		Destroyed; birthplace of explorer Alexander von Middendorff.
Pootsi Manor	Podis	Pärnu	Pärnu County	16th century		Belonged to the von Pahlen family, the von Lilienfeld family and the von Maydell family.
Porkuni Manor	Borkholm	Tapa Parish	Lääne-Viru County	1479		Current manor house dates to 1870–74. Battle of Porkuni fought nearby.
Pruuna Manor	Tois	Tapa Parish	Lääne-Viru County	1478		Main building dates from the 1860s. Currently a schoolhouse.
Pühajärve Manor	Heiligensee, Wollust	Otepää Parish	Valga County	1376		Belonged to the von Uexküll, von Siver and other families. Main building was rebuilt in the 1880s. Destroyed in 1944. Rebuilt in 1951.
Purdi Manor	Noistfer	Paide	Järva County	1560		Birthplace of Alexander von Ungern-Sternberg
Purila Manor	Purgel	Rapla Parish	Rapla County	1513		Current main building was completed in the 1800s.
Pürksi Manor	Birkas	Lääne-Nigula Parish	Lääne County	1620		Belonged to painter Johann Carl Emanuel von Ungern-Sternberg.
Putkaste Manor	Putkas	Hiiumaa Parish	Hiiu County	1529		Long associated with the von Stackelberg family. In disrepair.
Putkaste Manor	Putkas	Lääne-Nigula Parish	Lääne County	19th century		Main building erected in the early 19th century. Currently, privately owned.
Puurmani Manor	Schloß Talkhof	Põltsamaa Parish	Jõgeva County	Middle Ages		Formerly the site of a castle of the Livonian Order. Later associated with the von Buhrmeister and von Manteuffel families. In 1877–81, the Neo-Renaissance main building was constructed. Now a schoolhouse.
Raadi Manor	Ratshof	Tartu	Tartu County	Middle Ages		Belonged to the von Liphart family. Destroyed in 1944 during the Tartu Offensive. The site is now home to the Estonian National Museum.
Raasiku Manor	Rasik	Raasiku Parish	Harju County	Middle Ages		
Rae Manor	Johannishof	Rae Parish	Harju County	1390		Initially belonged to Saint Johannes hospital in the Middle Ages. The single-story stone main building originates from the 1850s. Now privately owned.
Rabivere Manor	Rabbifer	Kohila Parish	Rapla County	1417		
Rägavere Manor	Raggafer	Rakvere Parish	Lääne-Viru County	1540		Belonged to the Metztaken, Taube, Paykull, Schulmann, von Stackelberg, von Knorring, Kaulbars, von Herzfeld, von Dehn and Pilar von Pilchau families.
Raikküla Manor	Rayküll	Rapla Parish	Rapla County	1469, or earlier		Partially destroyed.
Ravila Manor	Mecks	Kose Parish	Harju County	1469		Formerly owned by the von Rosen, the von Uexküll, the von Detloff, the von Manteuffel and the von Kotzebue families. Now, a care home for the elderly.
Riisipere Manor	Neu-Riesenberg	Saue Parish	Harju County	1394		Owned by the von Stackelberg family. Formerly an orphanage.
Röa Manor	Röal	Türi Parish	Järva County	17th century		Owned by the von Budberg, von Stern, von Baranoff, Girard de Soucanton and the von Stackelberg families.
Rogosi Manor	Rogosinsky	Rõuge Parish	Võru County	c. 1600		Established by Stanislaw Rogosinsky. Later, belonged to the von Glasenapp family. Now a schoolhouse.
Roosna-Alliku Manor	Kaltenbrunn	Paide	Järva County	16th century		Belonged to the von Stackelberg family, among others.
Ropka Manor	Ropkoy	Tartu	Tartu County	1531		Now in the neighborhood Ropka in Tartu; belonged to the von Taube, von Igelström and von Brasch families, among others.
Ruila Manor	Ruil	Saue Parish	Harju County	1417		Initially belonged to the Livonian Order, then to the von Ullrich and von Bremen families. The current main building was completed in 1859.
Saadjärve Manor	Sadjerw	Tartu Parish	Tartu County	1628		Belonged to the Wrangel family, among others.
Saare Manor	Lückholm (Swedish: Lyckholm)	Lääne-Nigula Parish	Lääne County	1622		Belonged to the von Rosen family. Lied in ruins after World War II and was restored by the von Rosens around 2000.
Saare Manor	Saarenhof	Mustvee Parish	Jõgeva County	1512		Demolished in the 1930s.
Sagadi Manor	Saggad	Haljala Parish	Lääne-Viru County	1469		Located in Lahemaa National Park.
Saka Manor	Sackhof	Toila Parish	Ida-Viru County	1626		Belonged to Jürgen Leslie of Aberdeen.
Saku Manor	Sack	Saku Parish	Harju County	1463		Possibly designed by Carlo Rossi.
Salla Manor	Sall	Väike-Maarja Parish	Lääne-Viru County	Middle Ages		Long associated with the von Harpe family. Current main stone building dates from the 1770s. Currently, a school.
Sangaste Castle	Sagnitz	Otepää Parish	Valga County	1522		Designed by architect Otto Pius Hippius.
Sänna Manor	Sennen	Rõuge Parish	Võru County	Middle Ages		Belonged to the von Budberg, von Vietinghoff and von Fusch families. Current manor house dates from 1875. Currently houses a library and a community centre.
Särevere Manor	Serrefer	Türi Parish	Järva County	17th century		Belonged to the von Uexküll-Güldenbandt, von Wrangell and the von Schilling families. The main building was completed at the second half of the 19th century, most probably by rebuilding the former Baroque building.
Sargvere Manor	Sarkfer	Paide	Järva County	1722		Belonged to various Baltic German noble families including the von Essen family, the von Stackelberg family, among others.
Saue Manor	Friedrichshof	Saue Parish	Harju County	17th century		Belonged to the von Scharenberg, the von Fersen, the von Rehbinder, the von Ruckteschell and the von Straelborn families.
Sauga Manor	Sauck	Tori Parish	Pärnu County	1560, or earlier		The single-storey Late-Classicist main building dates from 1849, and is now in ruins.
Sausti Manor	Gross-Sauss	Kiili Parish	Harju County	1453		Belonged to various Baltic German noble families, including the Tiesenhausen family.
Seidla Manor	Seydell	Järva Parish	Järva County	1639		Belonged to the von Mohrenschildt, von Vietinghoff and the von Schilling families.
Seli Manor	Sellie	Rapla Parish	Rapla County	1474		Belonged to the Pirita Convent during the Middle Ages. Main building was rebuilt several times in the 19th and the 20th-centuries. Now houses the Freedom Fighters' (WWII veterans) Health Centre.
Sillapää Manor	Rappin	Räpina Parish	Põlva County	1582		Also known as Räpina Manor. Belonged to Bengt Oxenstierna.
Sõmerpalu Manor	Sommerpahlen	Võru Parish	Võru County	1544		Built as a vassal stronghold by the von Kursell family. The current main building was completed during the ownership of the von Moeller family in the 1860s. Now privately owned.
Sooniste Manor	Soinitz	Märjamaa Parish	Rapla County	17th century		Belonged to the von Essen and von Mohrenschildt families. Rebuilt after a 1905 fire.
Sootaga Manor	Sotaga	Tartu Parish	Tartu County	Middle Ages		Abandoned.
Sutlema Manor	Sutlem	Kohila Parish	Rapla County	1425, or earlier		Belonged to the von Maydell and von Stackelberg families. Partial ruins.
Suure-Konguta Manor	Schloß Kongota, Groß-Kongota	Elva Parish	Tartu County	1417		Belonged to the von Tiesenhausen family in the Middle Ages. The older main building of the manor was built at the beginning of the 19th century or earlier. The Heimatstil two-storey main building was completed around 1910. Now privately owned.
Suure-Kõpu Manor	Gross-Köppu	Põhja-Sakala Parish	Viljandi County	1487		Belonged to the von Stryk family. Now a schoolhouse.
Suure-Lähtru Manor	Gross-Lächtigall	Lääne-Nigula Parish	Lääne County	16th century		Belonged to the von Baranoff, von Stryk and the von Ramm families. The current main building dates from 1778 and is currently in private ownership.
Suuremõisa Manor	Grossenhof	Hiiumaa Parish	Hiiu County	16th century		Belonged to Jacob De la Gardie and later, pirate Otto Reinhold Ludwig von Ungern-Sternberg.
Taagepera Castle	Wagenküll	Tõrva Parish	Valga County	16th century		Belonged to the von Stackelberg family, among others.
Taali Manor	Staelenhof	Tori Parish	Pärnu County	17th century		Belonged to the Staël von Holstein family.
Taaliku Manor	Thalik	Saaremaa Parish	Saare County	1532		Originally belonged to the von Uexküll family. Later sold to Jürgen Peets and remained in the Peets family for generations. After the Great Northern War, the manor has belonged to the von Buhrmeister, von Büncken, von Vietinghoff and the von Aderkas families.
Tahvea Manor	Taiwola	Valga Parish	Valga County	1627 or earlier		Belonged the von Delwig and von Koskull families. Later served as a home for disabled children and a sanatorium for children with tuberculosis. Destroyed in 1944.
Tahkuranna Manor	Tackerort	Häädemeeste Parish	Pärnu County	1560, or earlier		Formerly owned by Franz Bernhard von Thurn und Valsassina. Birthplace of Estonian songwriter Karl Ramm.
Tähtvere Manor	Techelfer	Nõo Parish	Tartu County	1515		Now owned by the Estonian University of Life Sciences.
Tammistu Manor	Tammist	Tartu Parish	Tartu County	18th century		Current Classical main building of stone was added in the 19th century.
Tapa Manor	Taps	Tapa Parish	Lääne-Viru County	17th century		Belonged to the von Tiesenhausen and von Fock families. Partially destroyed in a fire in 1941. Rebuilt and is currently privately owned.
Tilsi Manor	Tilsi	Põlva Parish	Põlva County	1749		Partially destroyed.
Tohisoo Manor	Tois	Kohila Parish	Rapla County	17th century		Belonged to numerous Baltic German and Swedish noble families, including the von Essen family and the Wrangel family.
Torma Manor	Padefest	Jõgeva Parish	Jõgeva County	1493		Current main building dates from the 1830s.
Tõstamaa Manor	Testama	Pärnu	Pärnu County	1553		Initially belonged to the bishop of Saare-Lääne. Later belonged to the von Kursell, von Helmersen and von Staël-Holstein families. Formerly owned by Alexander von Staël-Holstein. The Early-Classical two-storey main building was built in 1804 and has been preserved as it was in the 1870s. Restored at the beginning of the 2000s and currently houses a school.
Tuudi Manor	Tuttomäggi	Lääneranna Parish	Pärnu County	17th century		Belonged to the von Gersdorff and Edler von Rennenkampff families.
Uderna Manor	Uddern	Elva Parish	Tartu County	1486		Belonged to the Tiesenhausen family.
Udeva Manor	Uddewa	Järva Parish	Järva County	1594		Destroyed.
Udriku Manor	Uddrich	Kadrina Parish	Lääne-Viru County	1642		Belonged to Henrik von Rehbinder.
Uhtna Manor	Uchten	Rakvere Parish	Lääne-Viru County	1489		Belonged to the von Taube, von Wrangell and von Weiss families. Main building built in 1820. Currently privately owned.
Üksnurme Manor	Uxnorm	Saku Parish	Harju County	1630		Current main building built in the 1860s by the von der Pahlen family. Now privately owned and in disrepair.
Ulvi Manor	Oehrten	Vinni Parish	Lääne-Viru County	1489, or earlier		Belonged to the Clapier de Colongue and von Winkler families. Currently a community center and seat for the local government.
Undla Manor	Undel	Kadrina Parish	Lääne-Viru County	1453, or earlier		Belonged to the von Dellingshausen family for many generations. The current main building was constructed in 1877. Currently houses a nursing home.
Ungru Manor	Linden	Haapsalu	Lääne County	1523		Last construction on the manor occurred in 1893 by the Ungern-Sternberg family. Never completed, in ruins.
Uuemõisa Manor	Neuenhof	Haapsalu	Lääne County	1539		Belonged to Eugenie Mikhailovna Shakhovskaya.
Uue-Põltsamaa Manor	Neu-Oberpahlen	Põltsamaa Parish	Jõgeva County	c. 1750		Belonged to the von Lilienfeld family. Currently privately owned.
Uue-Suislepa Manor	Neu-Suislep	Viljandi Parish	Viljandi County	1796		Associated with the von Mengden and von Kruedener families. Now houses a school.
Uue-Varbla Manor	Neu-Werpel	Lääneranna Parish	Pärnu County	1799		Built by the von Nascakin family. Currently houses a small museum dedicated to local history.
Uusna Manor	Neu-Tennasilm	Viljandi Parish	Viljandi County	1743		Allocated by Elizabeth of Russia to Baron Balthasar von Campenhausen. Later belonged to the von Bruiningk, von Manteuffel, von Taube, and von zur Mühlen families.
Vääna Manor	Faehna	Harku Parish	Harju County	1325		Belonged to the von Stackelberg family; Otto Magnus von Stackelberg was born there.
Väätsa Manor	Waetz	Türi Parish	Järva County	1620-1630		Belonged to the von Baranoff and von Seydlitz families. The Early Classicist main building, constructed around 1800, is now used as a schoolhouse. The manor hall was renovated in 2002.
Väikemõisa Manor	Kleinhof	Viljandi Parish	Viljandi County	19th century		Founded as a support manor of Karula manor. Owned by the von Helmersen family. Now houses an orphanage.
Väimela Manor	Waimel, Alt-Waimel	Võru Parish	Võru County	1590, or earlier		Belonged to von Richter and von Loewen families. Currently houses a vocational school.
Vaimõisa Manor	Waddemois	Märjamaa Parish	Rapla County	1494		Birthplace of Gustav Heinrich von Wetter-Rosenthal, Reinhold Johann von Nasackin, Friedrich Hubert Wendach.
Valgu Manor	Walck	Märjamaa Parish	Rapla County	1248		Formerly belonged to the von Budberg, von Staal, von Uexküll and Pilar von Pilchau families. Main building burned down in 1905 and reconstructed. Currently houses a school.
Valkla Manor	Wallküll	Kuusalu Parish	Harju County	1627		Belonged to the von Wrangell, von Brevern, von Nascakin and von Ramm families. Main building was constructed in the 1760s. Currently houses a nursing home.
Väinjärve Manor	Weinjerwen	Järva Parish	Järva County	after 1663		Birthplace of the first Imperial Russian general of Estonian descent Johann von Michelsohnen.
Vana-Kuuste Manor	Alt-Kusthof	Kambja Parish	Tartu County	1521		Built by the Zoege family. Later associated with the von Liphart, von Ungern-Sternberg and von Sivers families. The two-storey main building dates to around 1800 and today houses a school.
Vana-Nursi Manor	Alt-Nursie	Rõuge Parish	Võru County	1688		Partially destroyed. Belonged to the von Freymann, von Herzberg and von Wahl families. The articulated Neo-Renaissance main building was completed in the 1860s.
Vana-Pääla Manor	Taubenpöwel	Harku Parish	Harju County	16th century		Now privately owned.
Vana-Varbla manor	Werpel , later Alt-Werpel	Lääneranna Parish	Pärnu County	1426, or earlier		Owned by a succession of families, including the Fahrensbach, Zöge, Banér, von Nasackin, and von Pröbsting families. Demolished in 1939.
Vana-Vigala Manor	Fickel	Märjamaa Parish	Rapla County	13th century		Belonged to the von Uexküll family. Main building was constructed in the 1770s, slightly altered in the 1860s. Now houses a school.
Vana-Võidu Manor	Alt-Woidoma	Viljandi Parish	Viljandi County	c. 1504		Belonged to von Stryk family for a long time. Now houses a vocational education centre.
Vanamõisa Manor	Altenhof	Haljala Parish	Lääne-Viru County	c. 1660		Owned by the von Brevern family.
Varangu Manor	Warrang	Väike-Maarja Parish	Lääne-Viru County	17th century		Belonged to the von Krusenstern and von Schilling families.
Vasalemma Manor	Wassalem	Lääne-Harju Parish	Harju County	1825		Belonged both to the von Ramm and von Baggehufwudt families. The limestone Neo-Gothic main building was designed by architect Konstantin Wilcken for Eduard von Baggehufwudt and completed in 1894. The building now houses a school.
Vasta Manor	Waschel	Viru-Nigula Parish	Lääne-Viru County	1389		First mentioned in 1389, the main building was constructed around 1800. Now houses a school.
Vastse-Kambja Manor	Gut Neu-Kamby	Kambja Parish	Tartu County	17th century		Now houses a municipality administration.
Vatla Manor	Wattel	Lääneranna Parish	Pärnu County	16th century		Main building was constructed during the 1810s and the 1820s. Now houses a school.
Veltsi Manor	Weltz	Rakvere Parish	Lääne-Viru County	1709		Owned by the von Dehn family. Main manor building was constructed c. 1900.
Vihterpalu Manor	Wichterpal	Lääne-Harju Parish	Harju County	1622		Granted to Thomas von Ramm by Swedish King Gustavus Adolphus. Remained in the von Ramm family until the early 20th century.
Vihula Manor	Viol	Haljala Parish	Lääne-Viru County	1501		Located in Lahemaa National Park.
Viimsi Manor	Wiems	Jõelähtme Parish	Harju County	Middle Ages		Current manor house dates from after 1865. Owned by the von Stenbock, von Buxhoevden, von Maydell and von Schottländer families. Former summer home of Estonian military commander and statesman Johan Laidoner.
Viitina Manor	Kosse	Rõuge Parish	Võru County	1542		Belonged to mystic Barbara von Krüdener.
Viljandi Manor	Schloß Fellin	Viljandi	Viljandi County	17th century		Belonged to the Ungern-Sternberg family.
Visusti Manor	Wissust	Jõgeva Parish	Jõgeva County	1473, or earlier		Original structure burned in 1932. Partially rebuilt. Belonged to the Oettingen family. Physician and ophthalmologist Georg von Oettingen and theologian and statistician Alexander von Oettingen were born in Visusti Manor.
Viti Manor	Wittenpöwel	Harku Parish	Harju County	1630		Belonged to the von Wistinghausen and von Stackelberg families for several generations. Belonged to author Eduard Vilde's father in the 1890s. Currently houses an orphanage.
Võhmuta Manor	Wechmuth	Tapa Parish	Lääne-Viru County	17th century		Belonged to the von Hoeppener, von Tiesenhausen, von Baumgarten, von Essen and Zoege von Manteuffel families. Now in disrepair.
Vohnja Manor	Fonal	Kadrina Parish	Lääne-Viru County	1504		Belonged to the Oxenstierna and Tiesenhausen families, among others.
Võidula Manor	Karolinenhof	Põhja-Pärnumaa Parish	Pärnu County	1822		First established as a glass factory of the Vana-Vändra estate. Main wooden manor built in 1872.
Võisiku Manor	Woiseck	Põltsamaa Parish	Jõgeva County	1558		Birthplace of Friedrich Amelung, cultural historian, businessman and chess endgame composer.
Voltveti Manor	Tignitz	Saarde Parish	Pärnu County	1601		Present main building built in 1830. Now a vocational school.
Voore Manor	Forby	Saue Parish	Harju County	1569, or earlier		Belonged to the von Dahl, von Frey and von zur Mühlen families.
Vooru Manor	Worroküll	Viljandi Parish	Viljandi County	16th century		Partially destroyed; briefly belonged to August von Kotzebue

== See also ==
- Baltic nobility
- Baltic Germans
- List of palaces and manor houses in Latvia
- List of palaces and manor houses in Lithuania
- List of castles
- List of castles in Estonia
- List of castles in Latvia
- List of castles in Lithuania
- List of summer manors in Estonia

== Additional information ==
=== Sources ===
- Hein, Ants (2009). Eesti Mõisad - Herrenhäuser in Estland - Estonian Manor Houses. Tallinn: Tänapäev. ISBN 978-9985-62-765-5.
