= Anrep =

Anrep may refer to:

- Anrep family of Sweden and Russia
- Joseph Carl von Anrep (1796–1860)
- Boris Anrep (1883–1969), Russian artist
- Gabriel Anrep (1821–1907), Swedish genealogist and author
- Anrep effect
