= ESSU (disambiguation) =

ESSU or Essu may refer to:

- Eastern Samar State University, a university in the Philippines
- Essu, a village in Estonia
- Espoon Suunta (EsSu), an orienteering club from Espoo, Finland
- Eskilstuna Airport, Sweden (by ICAO code)
