= Kärstna =

Village in Estonia

- Village
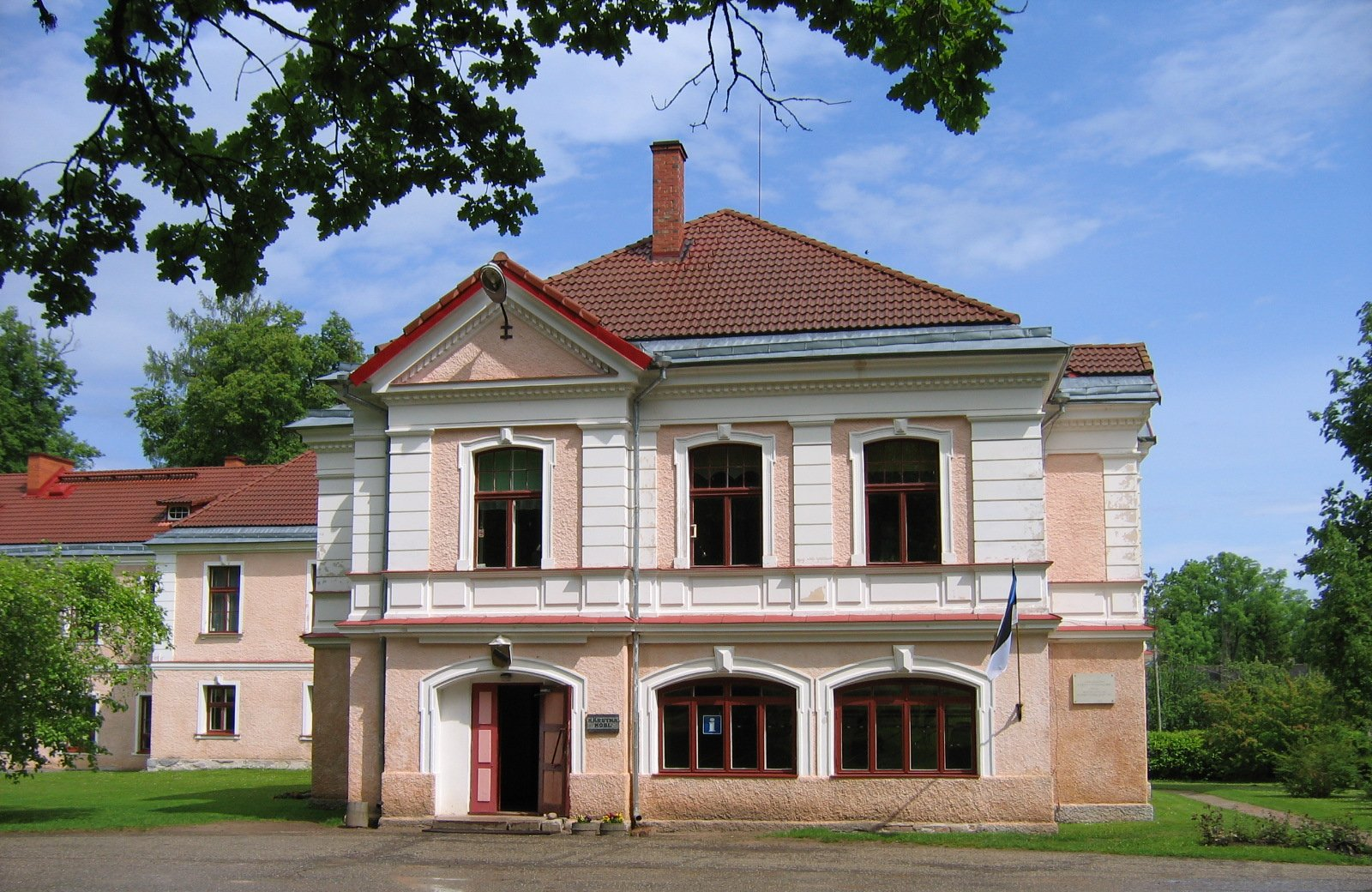
- Kärstna manor

- Location in Estonia
- Coordinates: 58°08′38″N 25°48′15″E
- Country: Estonia
- County: Viljandi County
- Municipality: Viljandi Parish

Kärstna is a village in Viljandi Parish, Viljandi County, Estonia. Until the 2017 administrative reform of Estonian municipalities the village was located in Tarvastu Parish.

== Kärstna manor ==
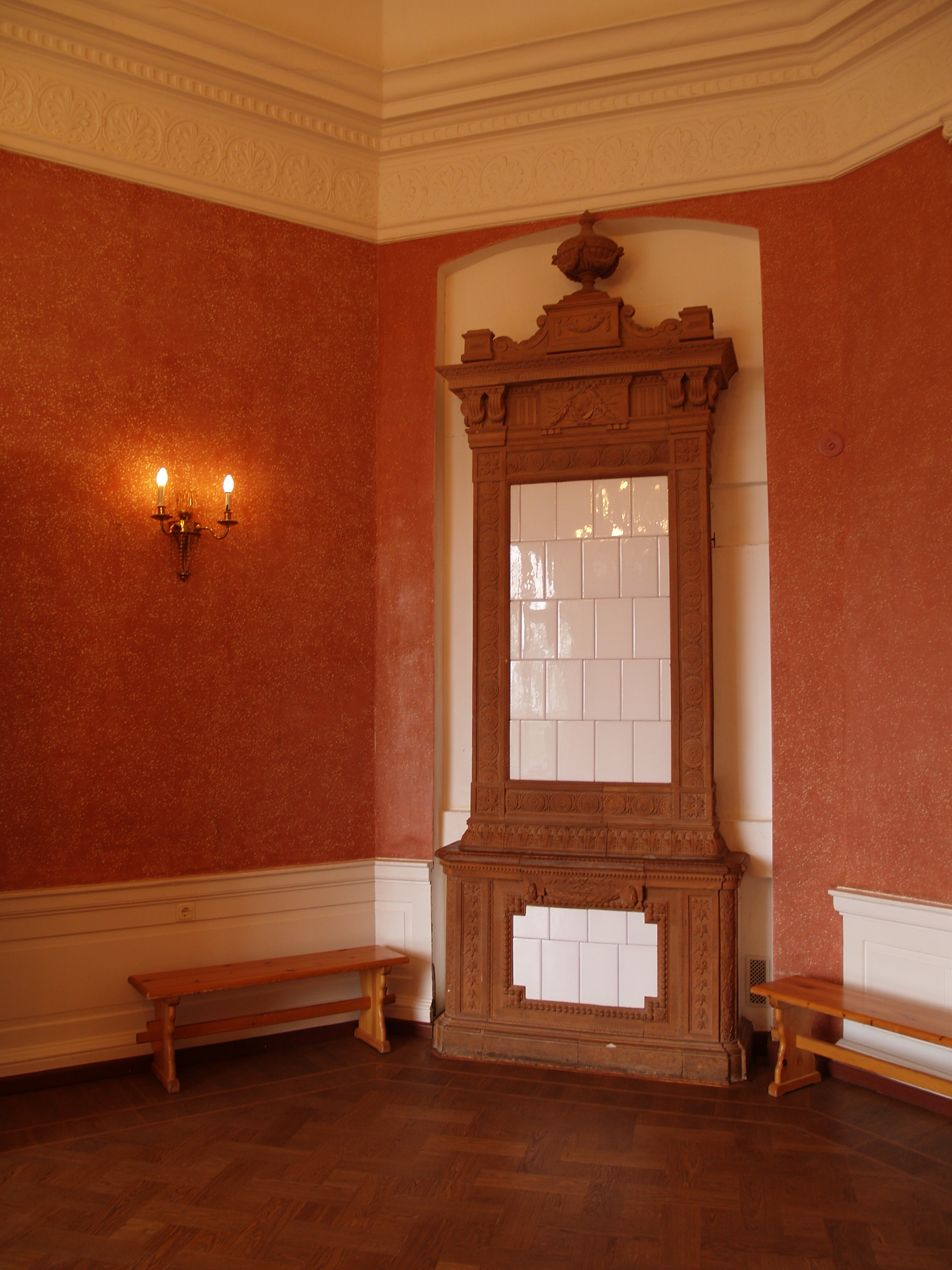
Interior of Kärstna manor

Kärstna (German: Kerstenshof) manor traces its history back to 1678, when the estate was founded. Subsequently, it belonged to various Baltic German families from the local upper-class. In 1740, it became the property of the Anrep family and stayed in their hands for much of its later history. It thus was the property of explorer Reinhold von Anrep-Elmpt, his father Russian general Joseph Carl von Anrep, and his father, Reinhold von Arnep, also a general. A monument commemorating the latter, who died in the Battle of Mohrungen during the War of the Fourth Coalition, is located near the manor house. The manor house was built in the mid-18th century and rebuilt in the early 20th century, but was destroyed in a fire soon after. The building received its present appearance during the subsequent rebuilding, led by Riga-based architect Otto Wildau. A park was laid out for the house in 1904, designed by Walter von Engelhardt, also from Riga.

== See also ==
- List of palaces and manor houses in Estonia
