= Lillimõisa =

Village in Estonia

- Village
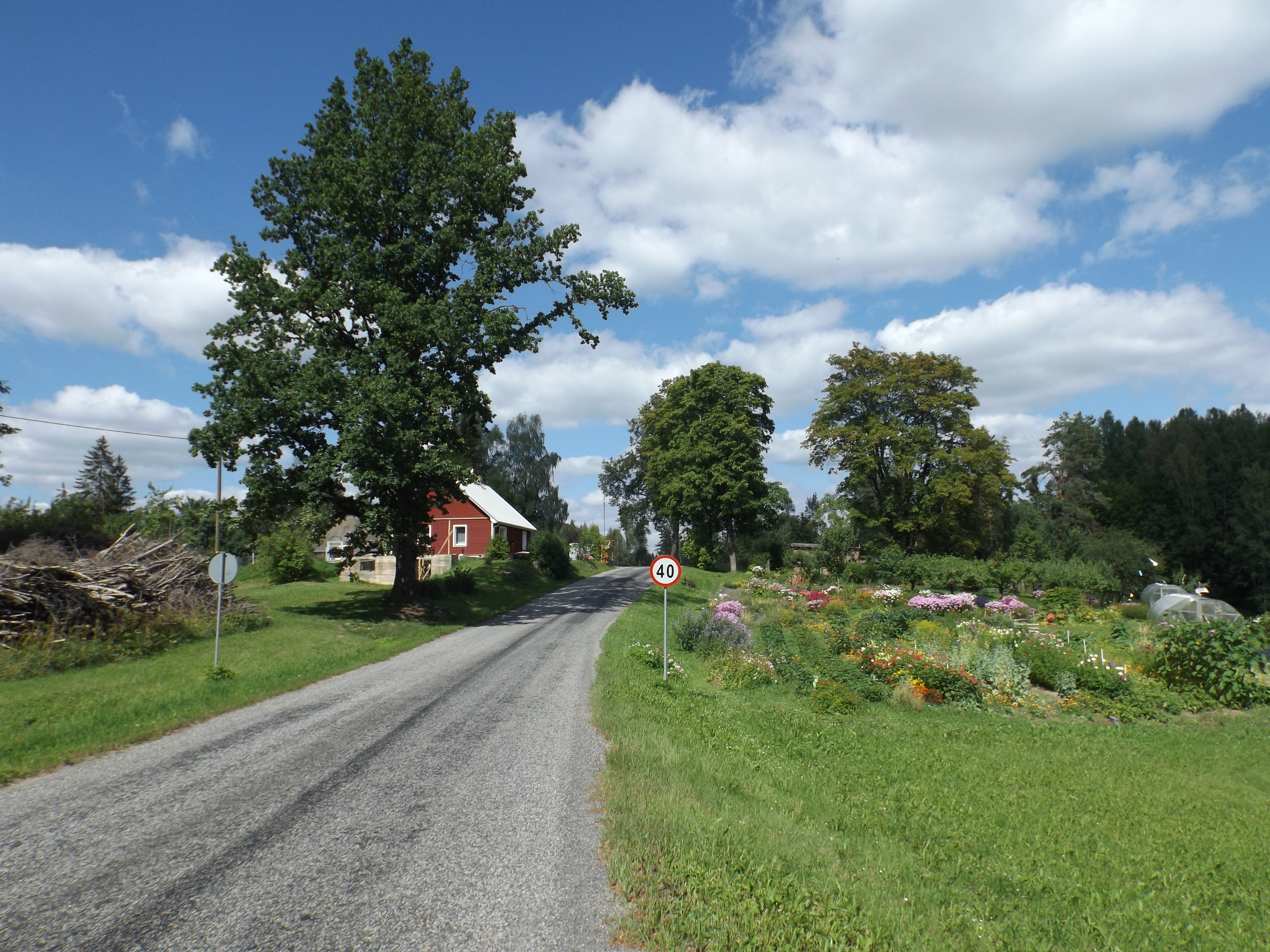
- Ruusmäe-Kuklase road through Lillimõisa

- Location within Estonia
- Coordinates: 57.619722222222°N 27.094444444444°E
- Country: Estonia
- County: Võru County
- Parish: Rõuge Parish
- Time zone: UTC+2 (EET)
  - Summer (DST): UTC+3 (EEST)

Lillimõisa is a village in Rõuge Parish, Võru County in Estonia.
