= Vassily von Anrep =

Vassily Konstantinovich von Anrep (29 September 1852 – 1 October 1927) was a Russian surgeon who worked in the army and later in the medical governance in St Petersburg. He is considered as a pioneer of local anesthesia having conducted experiments on local anesthesia using cocaine and suggested its use in surgery in 1879. His son Gleb Anrep (1891-1955) became a medical physiologist.

== Biography ==
Von Anrep was born in Lifyandskaya, St. Petersburg to Russian navy officer Konstantin Joseph von Anrep and Julia Ozersky. The family belonged to the Anrep nobility and the father moved to Yekaterinoslav where he went to gymnasium. He studied law in St Petersburg before shifting to medicine. He graduated in 1876 and served in the army during the Russo-Turkish wary of 1877. He left army service due to sickness and received a Order of Saint Stanislaus, 3rd Class. He then studied under Michael Rossbach at the University Würzburg and studied physiology in Leipzig under Carl Ludwig. After returning to St. Petersburg he wrote a dissertation ("кристаллического аконитина Duquesnel’я на организм животных: диссертация на степень доктора медицины") on cocaine under I. R. Tarkhanov in 1881. He had published a note in 1879 and wrote more on his clinical experiments in 1884. By this time it was also used by Carl Koller. He married Pascovia Zatzepin in 1882 and they had two sons and two from her earlier marriage. He worked as a medical inspector in the ministry of health from 1904 and was involved in setting up a women's medical institute in St. Petersburg. He was a member of the 3rd State Duma from 1907-1912 and was arrested after the 1917 revolution and he escaped to London. He lived for a while in Leningrad but after the death of his wife he moved to live with his son in England from 1921 and later another son in Paris. He died in Paris just before his 75th birthday.
