= List of summer manors in Estonia =

This is the list of summer manors (German: Höfchen) located in Estonia (mainly in Tallinn). The list is incomplete.

Name in English	Name in German	Location (city/town, address)	Further info	Image
Burchard Summer Manor		Tallinn		
Cederhilm Summer Manor	Cederhilm	Tallinn		
Lindheim Summer Manor	Lindheim	Tallinn		
Maarjamäe Summer Manor	Streitberg	Tallinn, Kadriorg	Main building is Maarjamäe Castle	

== See also ==
- List of palaces and manor houses in Estonia
