= Mattias Alexander von Ungern-Sternberg =

Swedish military officer and politician (1689–1763)

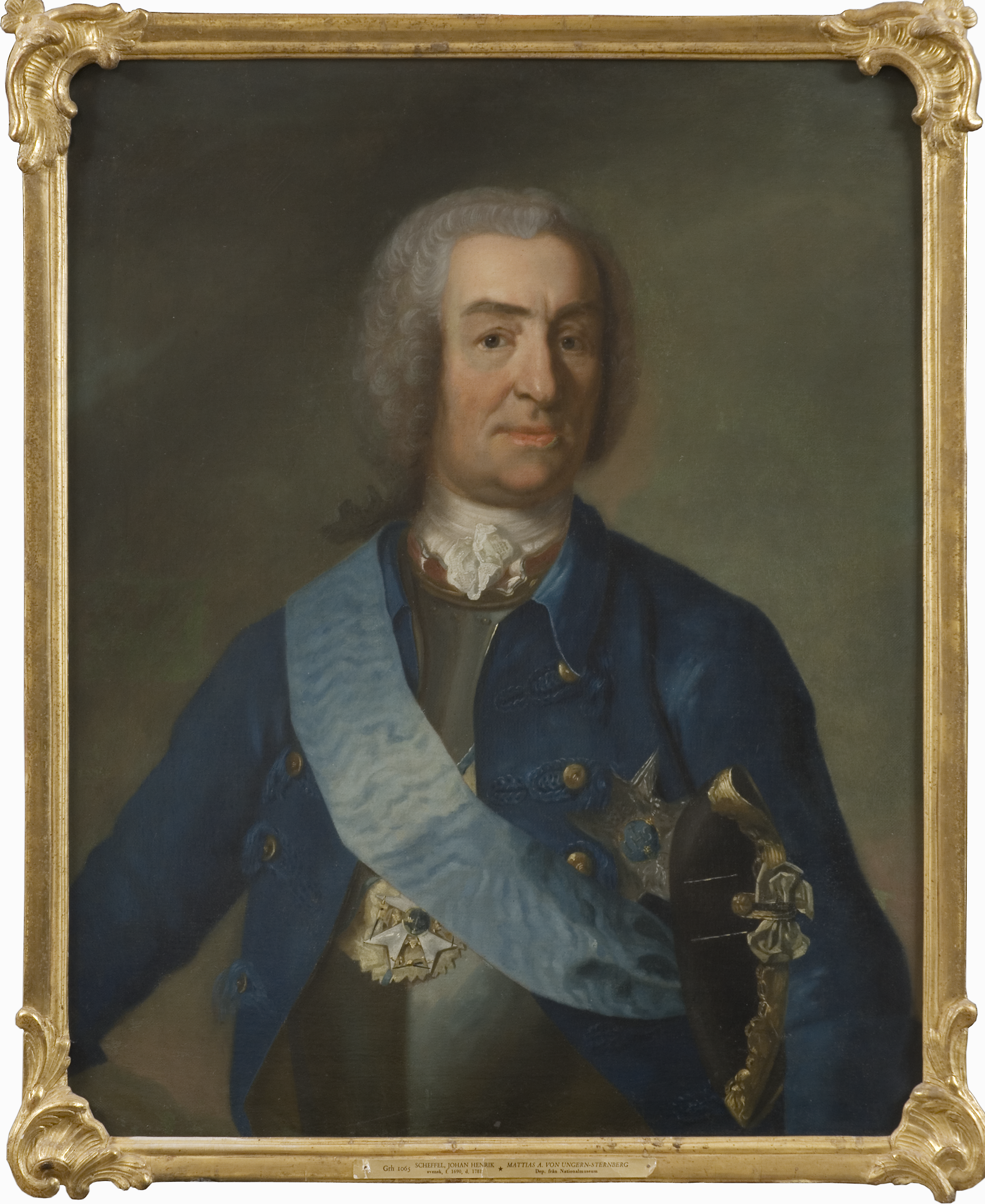
Portrait of Mattias Alexander von Ungern-Sternberg by Johan Henrik Scheffel.

Mattias Alexander von Ungern-Sternberg (3 March 1689 – 13 January 1763) was a Swedish military officer and politician. In his youth he fought in the War of the Spanish Succession and the Great Northern War. During the Age of Liberty, he was politically engaged in the Caps party and was elected Lord Marshal of the parliament, the Riksdag of the Estates, in 1742 and again in 1746. As a politician he was moderate and willing to compromise. His political activities benefitted his military career and he was promoted to field marshal in 1753. In 1757, he briefly commanded Swedish troops during the Pomeranian War but was quickly relieved of command following a lacklustre performance and retired to his family estate, Äs säteri, where he died in 1763.

== Biography ==
Mattias Alexander von Ungern-Sternberg was born in Stockholm on 3 March 1689. The family had come to Sweden from Livonia and traced their origins to Bohemia. His father was lieutenant general Nils Alexander von Ungern-Sternberg and his mother was Kristina Beatrix Palbitsky.

In 1704, he joined the Swedish army but quickly obtained permission to leave the country and instead join first the French and later the Dutch forces fighting in the War of the Spanish Succession. He participated in the Battle of Oudenarde and the Battle of Malplaquet, in which he was taken prisoner. After his release, he returned to Sweden in 1709 and re-joined the Swedish army, which was by that time fighting a defensive campaign following the disaster of the Battle of Poltava. In 1710 he participated in the Battle of Helsingborg, commanding a company of dragoons. In 1712 he was promoted to captain and in 1721 to the rank of major. He married Beata Sofia Mörner av Morlanda in 1732.

Following the end of the war and the Treaty of Nystad, Sweden entered a period of peace and more liberal politics, known as the Age of Liberty. During this time, Mattias Alexander von Ungern-Sternberg became engaged in politics. He sided with the political party known as the Caps. During the Russo-Swedish War of 1741–1743, he was obliged to participate in the campaign but managed to return to Stockholm in time for the session of parliament (the Riksdag of the Estates) in 1742, where he was elected Lord Marshal. In 1746, he was once more elected to the same office.

As a politician, he has been described as a moderate, seeking compromise rather than conflict, several times to the frustration of his own political party. His imposing physical appearance, clear way of expressing himself and ability to quickly grasp complex issues acted to his benefit. He retained close links to the royal court, but was careful to not become involved in the failed royalist coup attempt of 1756. In foreign politics, he refrained from siding with either of the two main groups at the time, the pro-French and the pro-Russian. He was described by Erik Gustaf Geijer as "an honest man with moderate capabilities", but his political maneuvering successfully benefited his military career. He was promoted to general in 1751 and to field marshal in 1753.

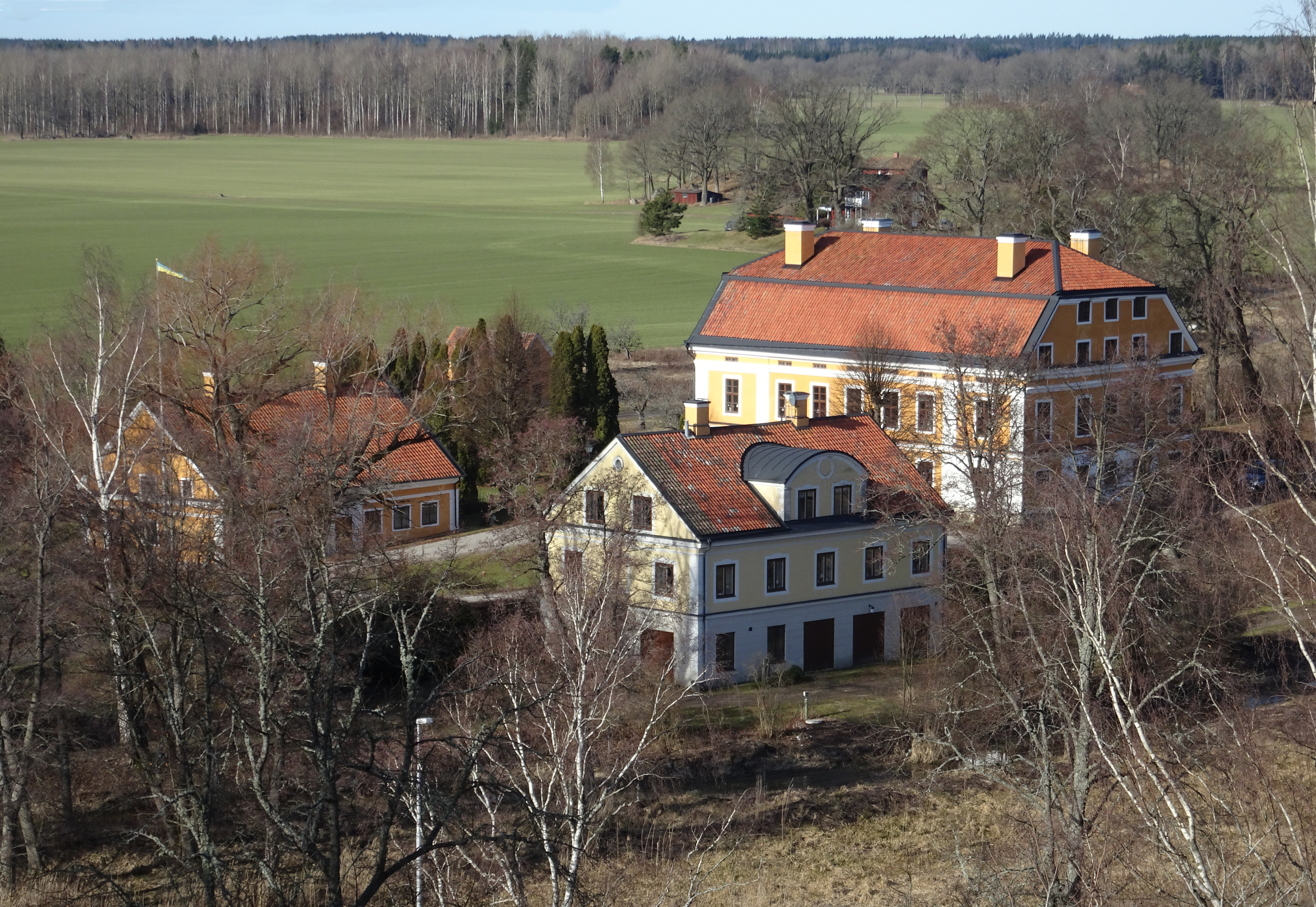
Äs säteri, where Mattias Alexander von Ungern-Sternberg spent the last years of his life.

At the outbreak of the Pomeranian War in 1757, he was given the overall command of Swedish troops in Swedish Pomerania. In October, he directed the army towards Ferdinandshof inside enemy territory in Prussia, but already in November he ordered the entire army back into Swedish territory to spend the winter there. The Riksdag was outraged, and on 20 December von Ungern-Sternberg was relieved of his command and replaced by Gustaf Fredrik von Rosen.

Following this, he retired from active service and spent the rest of his life on his family estate Äs säteri in Södermanland, Sweden. He died there on 13 January 1763.

== Awards and honours ==
- Member of the Royal Swedish Academy of Sciences (1747)
- Order of the Seraphim (1748)

== Sources cited ==
- Dahl, Torsten, ed. (1948). Svenska män och kvinnor. Biografisk uppslagsbok [Swedish men and women. Biographical dictionary] (in Swedish). Vol. 8. Stockholm: Albert Bonnier. OCLC 4629338.
- Hofberg, Herman; Heurlin, Frithiof; Millqvist, Viktor; Rubenson, Olof, eds. (1906). Svenskt biografiskt handlexikon [Swedish biographical handbook] (in Swedish). Vol. 2. Stockholm: Bonniers. OCLC 474064019.
- Rosander, Lars (2003). Sveriges fältmarskalkar [The field marshals of Sweden] (in Swedish). Lund: Historiska media. ISBN 91-89442-05-9.
