= Reinhold von Anrep-Elmpt =

Baltic German military personnel

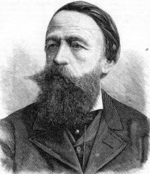
Reinhold von Anrep-Elmpt

Reinhold Philipp Johann Graf von Anrep-Elmpt (30 January 1834 – 26 August 1888) was a Baltic German officer in Russian service, and an explorer.

== Life and work ==
Reinhold von Anrep-Elmpt of the Anrep family was born in Kursk in the Russian Empire to Joseph Carl von Anrep and Cecilie Anrep, née von Elmpt. He grew up in Riga and Saint Petersburg. In 1854 he became a cornet in the Chevalier Guard Regiment. He served in the Crimean War. In 1858 he left the army with the rank of Rittmeister. The time between 1858 and 1870 he spent on his estate Kärstna Manor (German: Kerstenshof) in present-day Estonia. After this, he spent the rest of his life as an explorer, travelling to Australia, the East Indies, China, Japan, the Hawaiian Kingdom, California, Central America, South America, Cambodia and Thailand. He died in Thailand.

== Selected writings ==
- Von der Spitze des Großglockners auf die sieben Sandhügel am See Francisco (Riga 1882)
- Australien, Eine Reise durch den ganzen Welttheil (3 volumes, Leipzig 1886)
- Reise um die Welt, Beschreibung von Land und Meer, nebst Sitten und Kulturschilderungen mit besonderer Berücksichtigung der Tropennatur (Leipzig 1887)
