= Saadjärve =

Village in Estonia

- Village
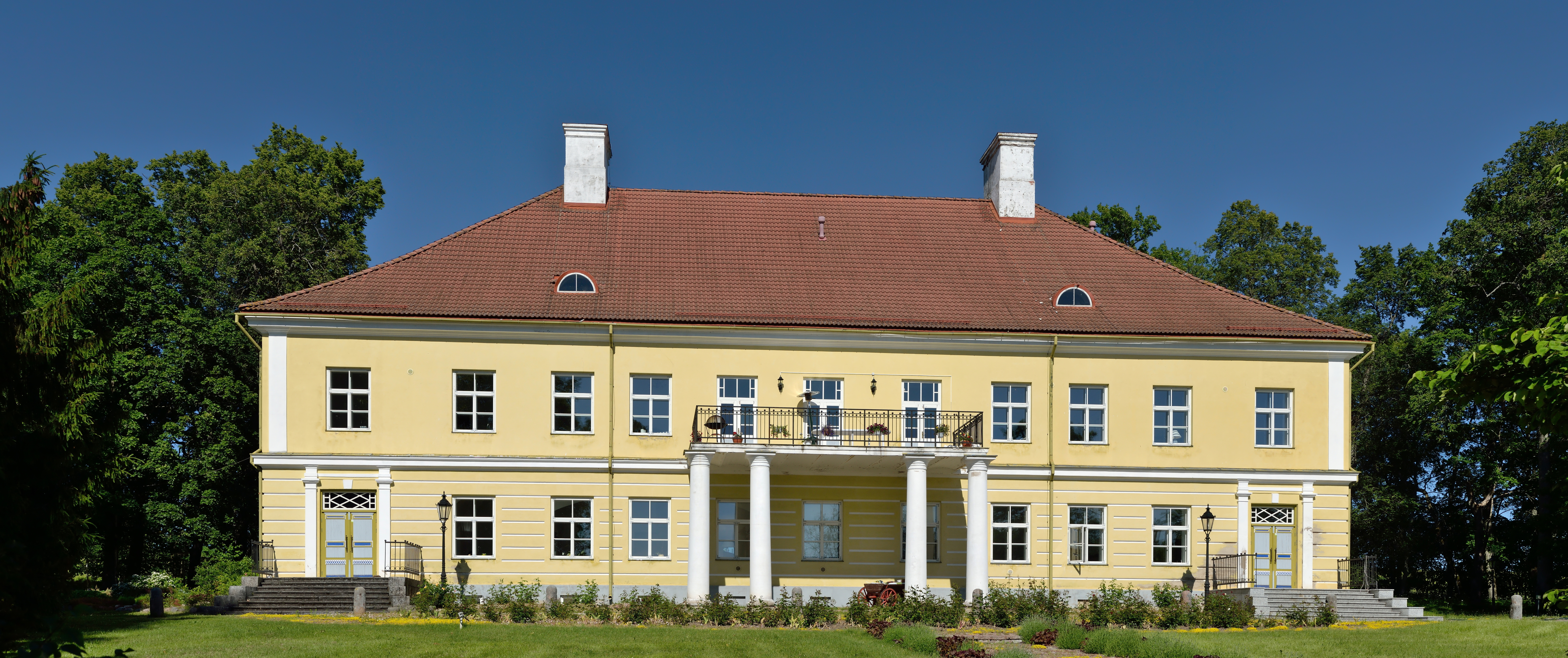
- Saadjärve manor

- Location in Estonia
- Coordinates: 58°32′20″N 26°41′16″E
- Country: Estonia
- County: Tartu County
- Municipality: Tartu Parish

Population (01.01.2012)
  - Total: 118

Saadjärve is a village in Tartu Parish, Tartu County in Estonia. It is located about 17 km north of the city of Tartu, on the eastern shore of Lake Saadjärv. Saadjärve has a population of 118 (as of 1 January 2012).

== Saadjärve manor ==
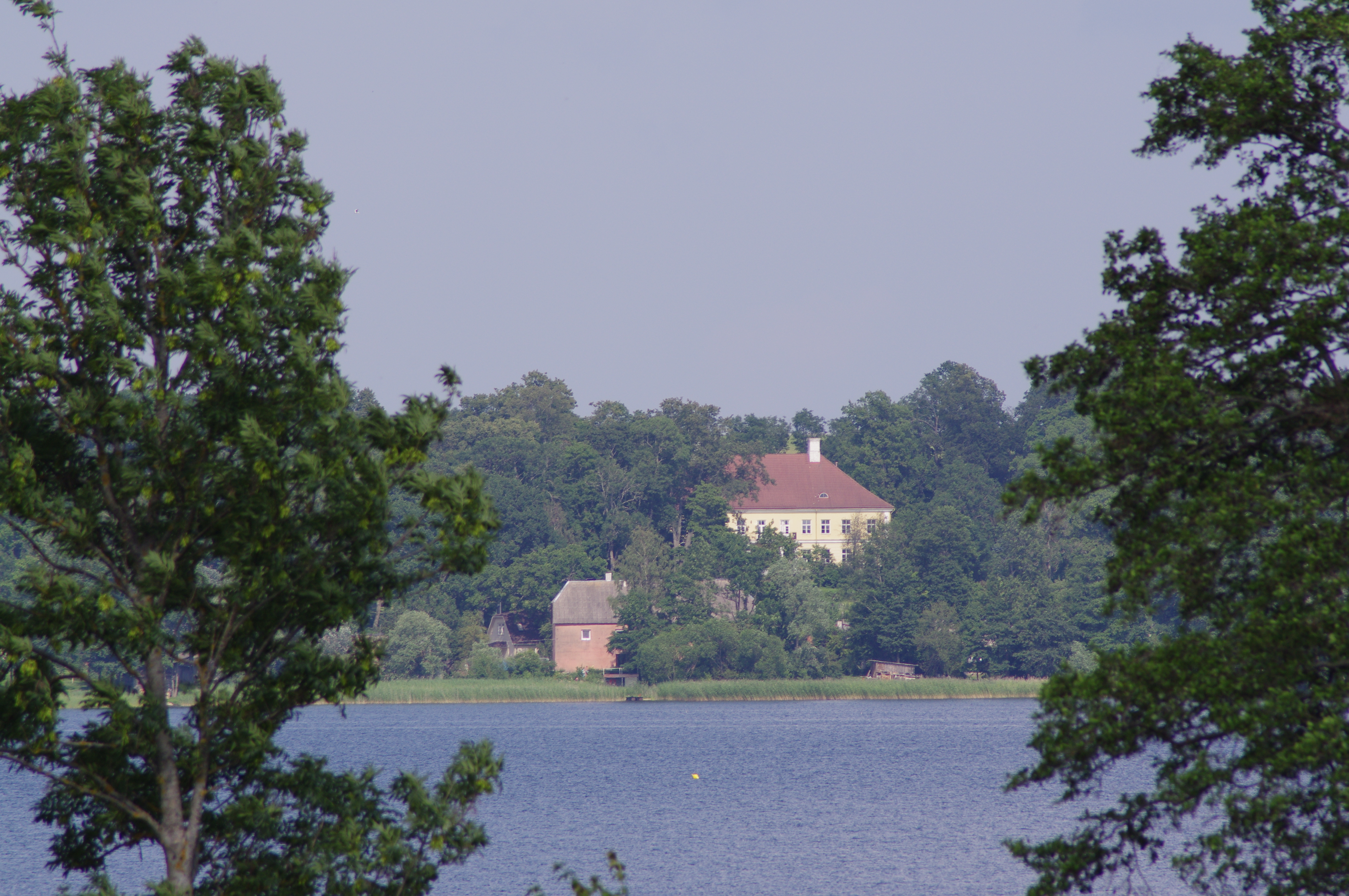
The manor and Lake Saadjärv

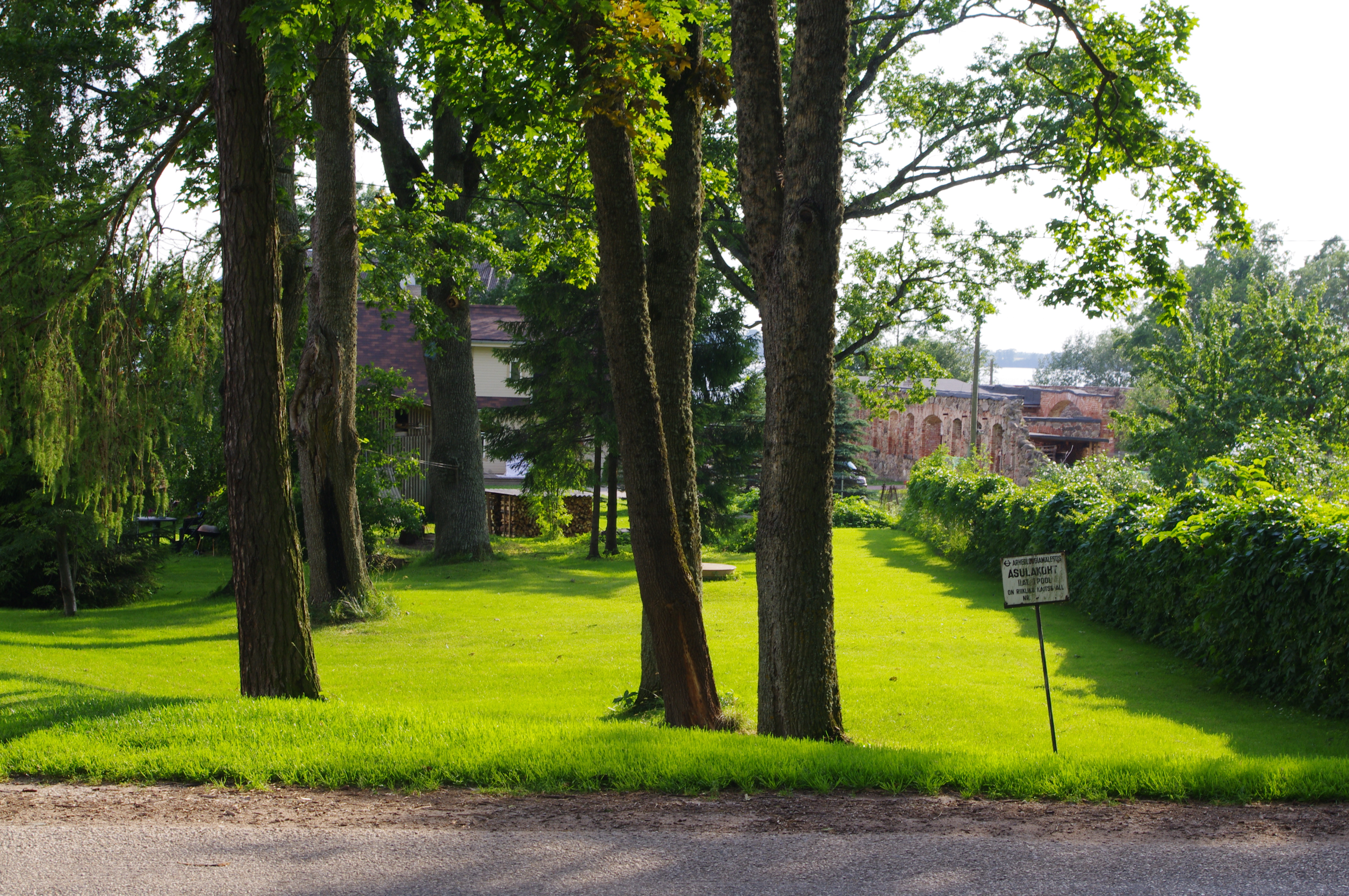
The site of an ancient Estonian settlement inside the manor grounds

Saadjärve estate (German: Sadjerw) is mentioned for the first time in historical records in 1557. During the course of history, it has belonged to a variety of Baltic German local aristocratic families. The present building dates from the late 18th or early 19th century.

== Notable residents ==
Saadjärve is the birthplace of Estonian politician Johannes Sikkar (1897–1960).

== See also ==
- List of palaces and manor houses in Estonia
