= Aruküla, Pärnu County =

Village in Estonia

Aruküla
- village
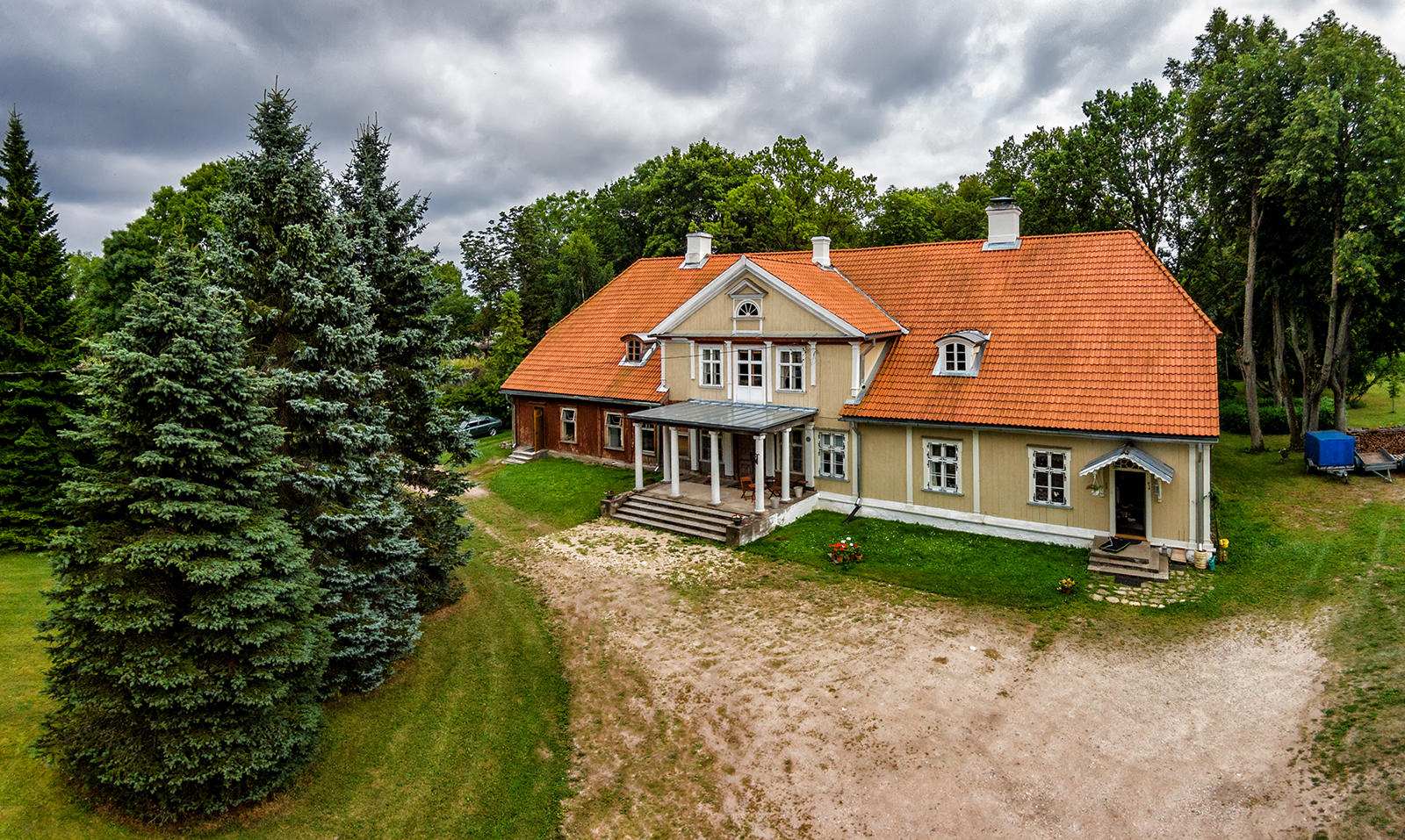
- Uue-Varbla manor and museum.

- Location in Estonia
- Coordinates: 58°24′43″N 23°46′22″E
- Country: Estonia
- County: Pärnu County
- Municipality: Lääneranna Parish

Population (01.01.2011)
  - Total: 76

Aruküla is a village in Lääneranna Parish, Pärnu County, in southwestern Estonia. It has a population of 76 (as of 1 January 2011).

Uue-Varbla Manor (Neu-Werpel) is located in Aruküla. It was established in 1799 by detaching it from the nearby Vana-Varbla Manor (Alt-Werpel). The Early-Classical wooden main building was constructed around the year 1800. Nowadays it houses the Varbla Museum.
