= Rehbinder =

Rehbinder is a German surname, and Baltic nobility of Westphalian origin:

- Berndt-Otto Rehbinder (1918–1974), Swedish Olympic fencer
- Johan Adam Rehbinder (1733–1809), Swedish historian
- Rehbinder (noble family)
  - Henrik von Rehbinder (1604–1680), Friherre of the Udriku Manor in Swedish Estonia
- Robert Henrik Rehbinder (1777–1841), Secretary of State for the Grand Duchy of Finland
- Piotr Rehbinder, Russian physicist, chemist
  - Rehbinder effect
