= Udriku =

Village in Estonia

Coordinates: 59°17′54″N 26°03′36″E

- Village
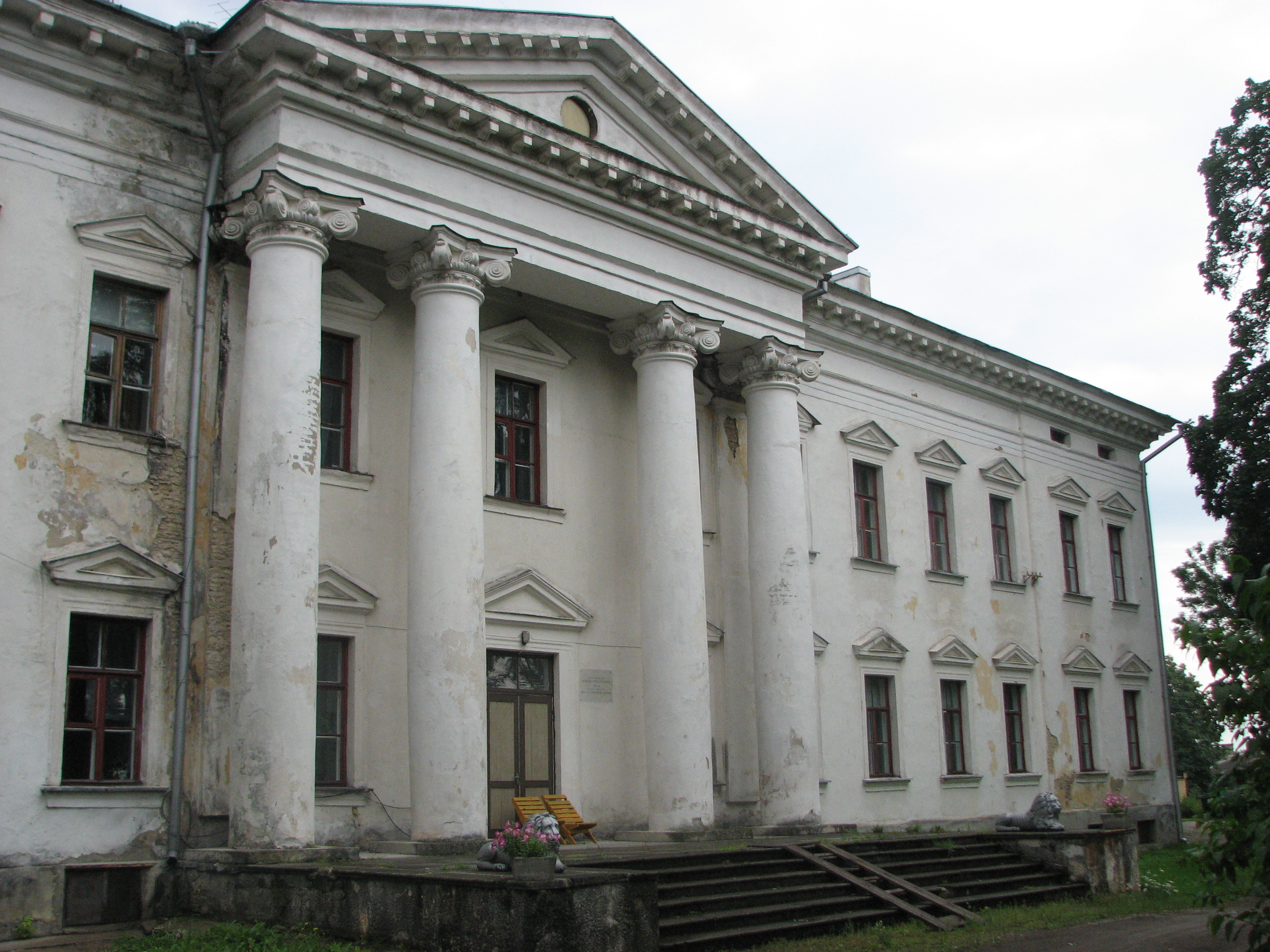
- Udriku Manor
- Interactive map of Udriku
- Country: Estonia
- County: Lääne-Viru County
- Parish: Kadrina Parish
- Time zone: UTC+2 (EET)
  - Summer (DST): UTC+3 (EEST)

Udriku is a village in Kadrina Parish, Lääne-Viru County, northeastern Estonia, where the Udriku manor, a national architectural monument built in the early nineteenth century, is situated.

== Udriku manor ==
Udriku estate (German: Uddrich) was founded in 1642 and belonged to the Baltic German Rehbinder family until the agrarian reforms following Estonia's independence in 1919. The current, neoclassical building is from 1803, and currently houses a nursing home. Some of the original interiors such as painted ceilings and plaster decorations are still preserved.

== See also ==
- Henrik von Rehbinder
