= Ropka =

Neighbourhood of Tartu, Estonia

Coordinates: 58°21′19.38″N 26°43′17.7″E

- Neighbourhood of Tartu
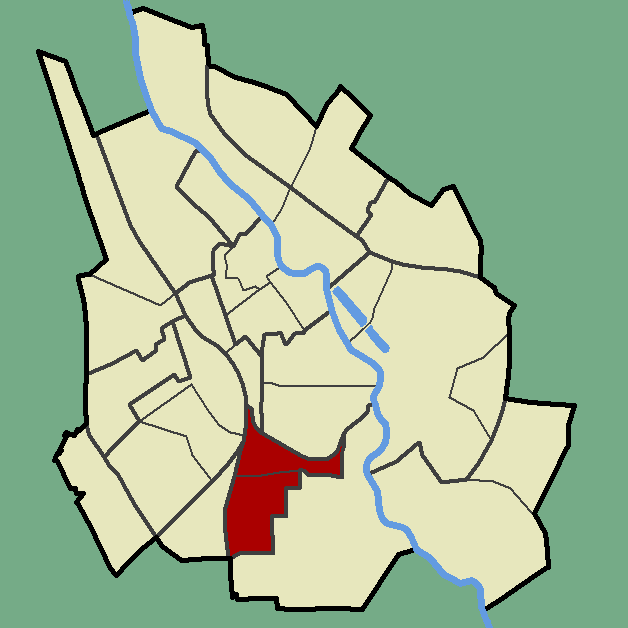
- Location of Ropka in Tartu.
- Country: Estonia
- County: Tartu County
- City: Tartu

Area
  - Total: 1.44 km^{2} (0.56 sq mi)

Population (31.12.2013)
  - Total: 5,078
  - Density: 3,530/km^{2} (9,130/sq mi)

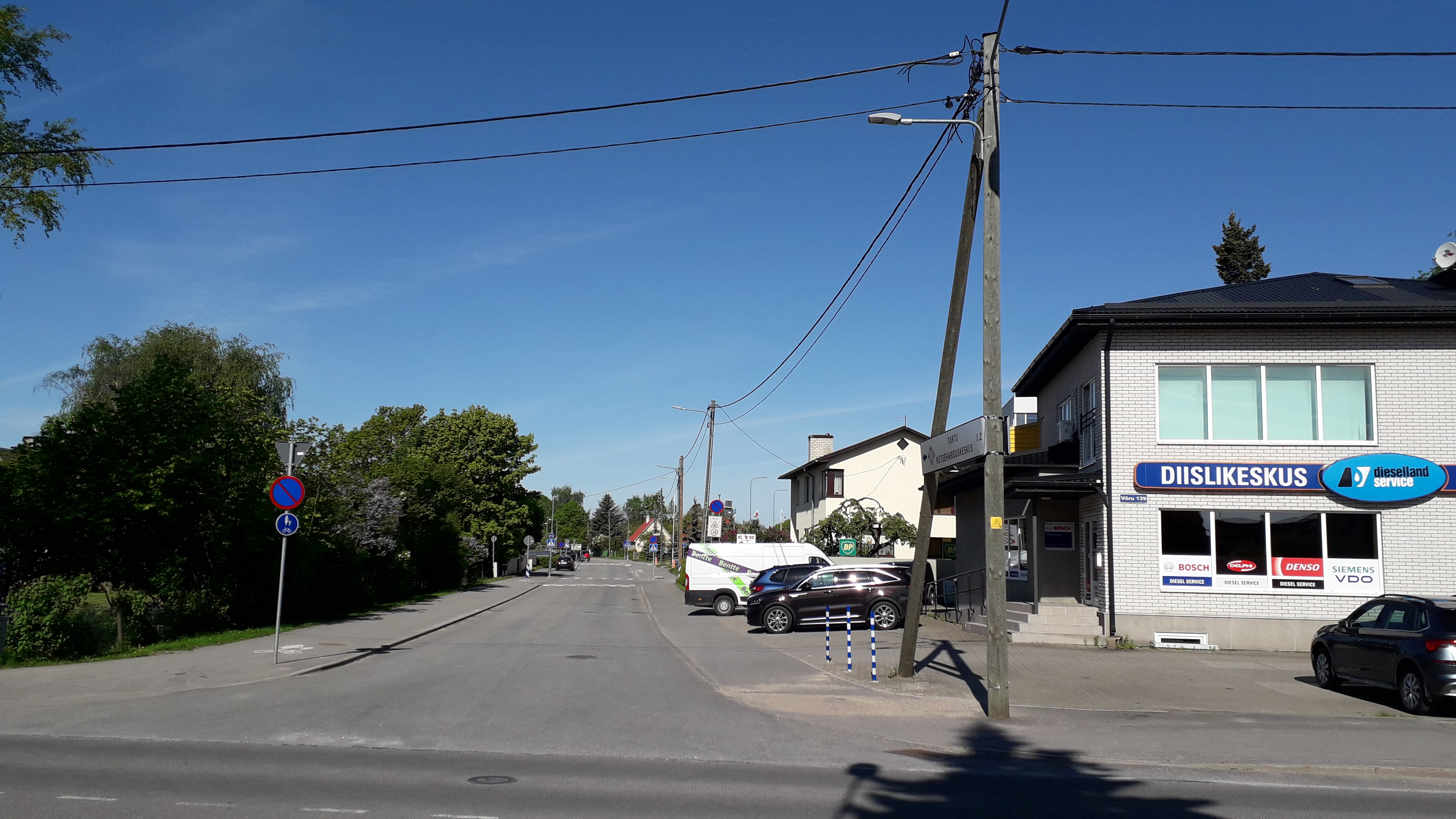
Kopli street, Ropka neighbourhood, Tartu

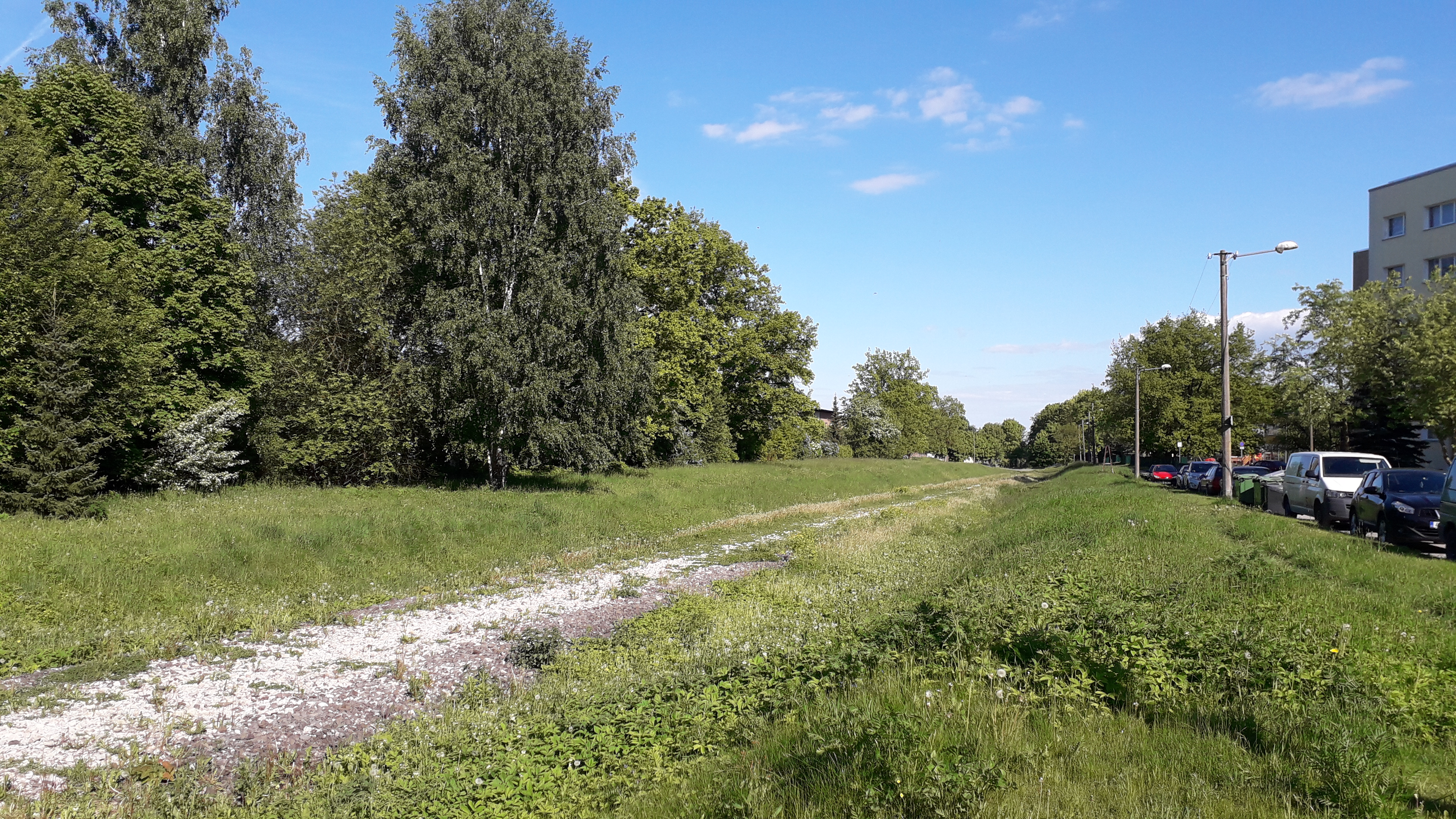
Location of the former railway serving the river port in Tartu Ropka neighborhood, May 2021

Ropka is a neighbourhood of Tartu, Estonia. It has a population of 5,078 (as of 31 December 2013) and an area of 1.44 km^{2} (0.56 mi^{2}).
