= Anrep (noble family) =

Swedish and Russian noble family

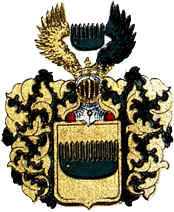
Anrep Coat of arms - historical image

Anrep: Coat of arms

The Anrep family is a Baltic-German noble family, belonging also to Swedish and Russian nobility.

== History ==
The family originates from Anreppen, a village on Lippe river in Westfalia, Germany (now a part of Delbrück town). In 15th century Anreps, belonging to the Teutonic Knights, settled in Livonia. In 1626, during the Thirty Years' War, this country became a dominion of Sweden.

Anrep family was soon naturalized in Sweden and introduced to the Riddarhuset, or House of Knights, in 1635. According to Brockhaus and Efron Encyclopedic Dictionary, German von Anrep was a Field Marshal in Sweden in the 16th century, and some Anreps were later also on French and Prussian military service .

By 1710, in the Great Northern War between Peter I of Russia and Charles XII of Sweden, Frederick Wilhelm I von Anrep, a captain in the Swedish army, had been taken to Moscow as a prisoner. From that time his branch of the family remained in Russia, serving the Tsars, generally in military or naval posts. Russian Anreps retained the Lutheran religion of their ancestors.

- Barbara Johandotter von Anrep (born 1534 - died ?) wife of Johann von Uexküll (1532 - 1563).
- Adolf Heinrich von Anrep (1717 - 1765) was the Landsmarshal of Livland, i.e. the chairman of the assembly of Livonian nobility.
- Heinrich Reinhold von Anrep (ru: Roman Karlovich von Anrep) (1760 – January 25, 1807) was a Russian general of cavalry during the Napoleonic Wars. Killed in the Battle of Mohrungen.
- Roman von Anrep (ru: Roman Romanovich von Anrep) (died 1830), a son of the previous, was a colonel and later a major-general. He commanded a Uhlan regiment in Caucasus during Russo-Turkish War, 1828-1829 and was a confidant of High Commander, Ivan Paskevich. Describing this campaign in his memoirs The voyage to Arzrum, Aleksandr Pushkin mentions R.R. Anrep. Later, in a letter to his wife, Pushkin referred to the death of R.R. Anrep, who had drowned in a swamp . The reason of the poet's attention to the officer is probably the fact that both of them courted the same young girl, Annette Woolf, in 1826 .
- Joseph Carl von Anrep (ru: Iosif Romanovich von Anrep) (1796 – 1860), a brother of the previous, was a colonel in Russian army, promoted to general shortly before his death. In 1853, by edict of Tzar, he was styled Count von Anrep-Elmpt in order to preserve the title of his wife's father, Count von Elmpt.
- Reinhold von Anrep-Elmpt (ru: Roman Iosifovich von Anrep-Elmpt) (1834 – 1888), a son of the previous, was a Russian explorer, who traveled intensively from 1870 in all five continents and published many volumes of his travel notes.
- Vassily Konstantinovich von Anrep (1852 – 1927) was a professor of forensic medicine and a Russian statesman. He had two sons, named after the first Russian saints, princes Boris and Gleb.
- Boris Anrep (Boris Vassilievich von Anrep, 1883 – 1969) was a Russian artist, active mostly in Britain, who devoted himself to the art of mosaics and achieved work of monumental character in many private and public places.
- Gleb Anrep (Gleb Vassilievich von Anrep; September 10, 1889 – January 9, 1955) was a physiologist, the follower of Ivan Pavlov, a member of the Royal Society from 1928, professor in University of Cambridge and in Cairo University.

== Sources ==
1. Brockhaus and Efron Encyclopedic Dictionary (1890 – 1907, 86 vol.)
2. Russian Biographies Dictionary by A.A. Polovtzov (1899 – 1918, 25 vol.)
3. Annabel Farjeon. The adventures of Russian artist: the biography of Boris Anrep. - St.Petersburg, 2003. (Russian translation of the unpublished English manuscript)

== See also ==
- Anrep (disambiguation)
