= Vana-Nursi =

Village in Estonia

- Village
- Location within Estonia
- Coordinates: 57.7847°N 26.9175°E
- Country: Estonia
- County: Võru County
- Parish: Võru Parish
- Time zone: UTC+2 (EET)
  - Summer (DST): UTC+3 (EEST)

Vana-Nursi is a village in Võru Parish, Võru County in Estonia. The village is located in southeastern Estonia, approximately 138 km southeast of Tallinn, the country's capital.

== History ==
=== Manor Era ===
Vana-Nursi has a significant historical background connected to the manor that was established in the area. The estate was established in 1688 and was historically associated with several noble families including the von Freymanns, von Herzbergs, and von Wahls. The main building, constructed in the Neo-Renaissance style, was completed in the 1860s. Historically, the manor belonged to Ruge Parish in Võrumaa County.

=== Soviet Period ===
During the Soviet occupation of Estonia (1940–1991), the area underwent significant changes. The manor's main building was slightly altered by the Soviet army in the 20th century. The nearby Nursipalu area was part of the Soviet Army Visnevski military campus and served as a training area for Soviet Airborne Troops and a missile brigade, covering an area of 3,703 hectares.
