= Ungern-Sternberg =

Baltic German noble family

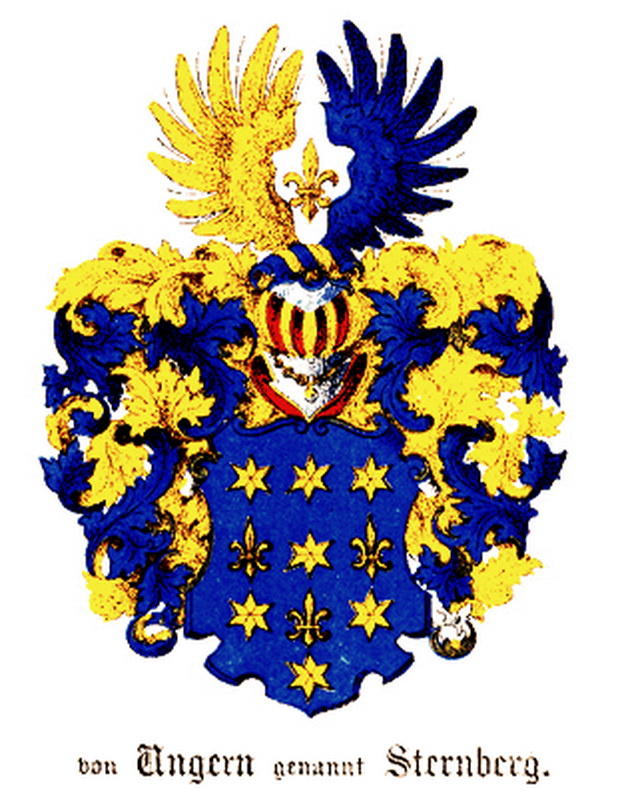
Original arms of the Ungern-Sternberg family

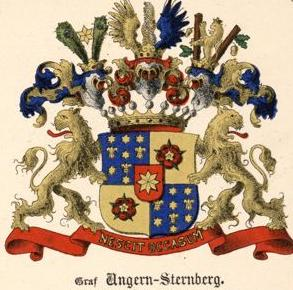
The comital arms

The Ungern-Sternberg family or von Ungern-Sternberg is an old and influential Baltic-German nobility, with branches belonging to the German, Estonian, Swedish and Russian nobility.

== History ==
=== Medieval Feudals ===
According to a semi-legendary story, a German knight named Johann Hans von Ungern arrived in Livonia in 1211 at the head of a detachment of 500 horsemen and foot soldiers. Johann became a vassal of the Archbishopric of Riga who granted him land holdings, and married a daughter of Caupo of Turaida. The first documented evidence of the family's existence starts with a charter of 1251. It is stated, in the charter, that, in recognition of service rendered by Johann Ungern (Note: Since he came from Hungary, Johann was known as Hans von Ungern or Iohannes de Ungaria. However, Jürgen von Ungern-Sternberg questions the dynasty's ties with Hungary.) in the war against the Latvian tribes, Bishopric of Riga Nikolaus von Nauen granted him 100 hakens (haken) of estate in the area called Semigallia, located on the east bank of the Daugava River, which flows past the city of Riga. However, he did not serve under the Teutonic Order.

On March 29, 1277, another member of the family, Rudolf von Ungern, concluded a treaty with the Master of the Livonian Order. According to Ferdynand Ossendowski, he was told that the Ungern-Sternbergs were German-Hungarian knights who fought in Crusades in the Middle East and the shores of Baltic Sea; and two members of the Ungern-Sternberg family fell in the Battle of Grunwald on July 15, 1410. Russian historian Sergious Kuzmin and German historian Jürgen von Ungern-Sternberg, a member of the family, deny the authenticity of these claims.

=== Baltic and Swedish branches ===
The hereditary lord of Pürkel, Georg von Ungern, a direct descendant of Rudolf Ungern, was a councillor of the Archibishop of Riga Wilhelm von Brandenburg, the brother of Albert, Duke of Prussia, future grand master of the Teutonic Knights. By a charter of Ferdinand I, Holy Roman Emperor of February 7, 1534, Georg von Ungern, was raised, together with his descendants, to the baronial dignity of the Holy Roman Empire, with the title Freiherr zu Puerkel. At the time, the Ungern family was the only noble family in Livonia entitled to bear the title of Freiherr.

In the 16th and 17th centuries the family owned large estates in Latvia and Estonia, mainly in the districts of Reval and Hapsal. The ancestral estate of the Ungern branch in Estonia was the manor of Ungru, which was founded in 1523. Its last owner as of 1919 was Klaus von Ungern-Sternberg. In the early 1600s, they added the name of Bohemian aristocratic Sternberg to their surname, becoming the Ungern-Sternberg family. They justified this by claiming a dynastic connection to the Counts of Sternberg.

Swedish Empire had taken over entire Livonia by 1691 after they defeated the Polish-Lithuanian Commonwealth. By Queen Christina of Sweden's charter of October 17, 1653, Woldemar, Otto and Reinhold von Ungern-Sternberg were confirmed in their baronial dignity. Most adult male members of the Ungern-Sternberg served in Swedish army. The most prominent of them was Reinhold von Ungern, a Swedish army officer and a member of Estonian Knighthood, who fought in battles against Russians, Danish and Ottomans. Reinhold is the ancestor of most present-day Ungern-Sternberg family members.

Another branch of the family in Sweden was prominent between the sixteenth and the early nineteenth centuries. The most famous representative of this branch is Mattias Alexander von Ungern-Sternberg (1689–1763). He fought at first on the French side against the Netherlands, then on behalf of the Netherlands against France in the Battle of Malplaquet around 1709, and later fought for Sweden in the war against Denmark near Helsingborg in 1710. While serving in the Swedish army in 1753, he barely attained the rank of field marshal of the infantry unit's cavalry. During the unsuccessful war waged against the Russian empire in 1741–1743, he led a political party, known as Caps, which sought peaceful resolution with Russian Tsar. The Swedish Riksdag elected Matthias Alexander as its Landsmarschal in 1742–1743; and he was again elected to the same post in 1746–1747. During the Seven Years' War, in 1756 Matthias Alexander was appointed commander-in-chief of the Swedish army stationed in Pomerania, but the condition of the army was very poor, and by the end of 1757 he was recalled to Sweden. He ended his own military service in 1762 holding the rank of General of the entire Swedish army. He also became a member of the Royal Academy of Sciences in Stockholm from 1747. The Ungerns were inducted into the Swedish House of Knights in 1660 as Baronial Family No. 54 under the name von Ungern Sternberg. The Swedish branch of the family became extinct in the 19th century.

Livonia formally became part of the Russian Empire in 1721 with the signing of the Treaty of Nystad, which concluded the Great Northern War. Lieutenant General Karl-Christer Ungern (1730–1799) served successfully in the Russo-Turkish War and later became the governor of St. Petersburg (1774–1779). In 1799, during the Russo-Turkish War, he served in the Russian army, as did his brother Johann-Michael (1747–1779), who attained the rank of general. In 1786, holding the rank of colonel, he commanded a militia unit in Siberia, and it was from that military post that he retired with the rank of major general.

Their notorious descendant Otto Reinhold Ludwig von Ungern-Sternberg (1744–1811) lived on Dagö Island in the late 18th century. He had served as a captain in the Dutch army, and later, in 1781, he purchased land from Count Karl Magnus Stenbock, called Hogenholm, and then bought land from Count Jakob Pontus Stenbock, called Gronsenhof, respectively. Jakob Pontus Stenbock became his most bitter enemy. Regarding his estate on Dagö Island, there were widespread rumors that he was plundering passing ships, and in 1797 he seized and captured the Swedish merchant vessel "Louise Caroline," treating it as though it were goods and cargo he had lawfully purchased. In 1802 he was accused of killing the captain of another ship. Stenbock succeeded in having a commission established under his direction with the Russian Emperor Alexander I's approval, and they arrested Otto-Reinhold-Ludwig Ungern who was soon sentenced for life in prison in 1803 and eventually died in Tobolsk in 1811.

By rulings of the Governing Senate of July 25 and September 5, 1855, and by the Highest-approved opinion of the State Council of December 20, 1865, the baronial title was recognized for the noble family of von Ungern-Sternberg, entered into the matriculation register of the Livonian and Estonian nobility in the Russian empire.

In 1874, Otto-Reinhold-Ludwig's grandson Ewald von Ungern-Sternberg received the comital title within the Russian Empire, altering their surname to Ungern-Šternbergov. The motto of their order was Nescim occasum ("[their star knows no sunset"), however, this was different from the Ungern-Sternberg's official symbols and mottos.

Otto-Reinhold-Ludwig's son, Peter-Ludwig Konstantin von Ungern-Sternberg (1779–1836), and his family established and operated a textile factory on Dagö. Under the management of Ernest Ungern, the factory was awarded the Grand Prix at an international exhibition in Paris. Several Ungerns worked in industry, academia, science, literature and politics in the 19th and early 20th centuries; and at least seven of them obtained doctor's degree.

Prominent male members of the family participated in various wars in Europe and Asia, including Napoleonic Wars, Russo-Turkish wars (Crimean War), World War I, Russian Civil War, and Mongolian Revolution of 1921. According to Roman von Ungern-Sternberg (1886-1921), a grandson of Peter-Ludwig Konstantin, 72 Ungerns lost their lives while serving under the imperial army.

=== Modern Age ===
Some Ungerns immigrated to Germany, Finland and the USA in the early 20th century largely due to the Russian Civil War or other conflicts in Europe, while some Ungern-Sternberg branches became extinct or lost fortune in Sweden, the Baltic and Russia. Members of the aristocratic Ungern-Sternberg currently live in Sweden, Poland, Russia and Germany.

The German historian, Jürgen von Ungern-Sternberg, taught ancient history at University of Duisburg-Essen and University of Basel. His family relocated to Germany from Riga in 1939. He was a silver patron of the University of Latvia Foundation. Jürgen supported the University of Latvia since 1999 by donating to establish a scholarship in memory of his grandfather Bernhard Holander. It is awarded to the best doctor or master of the Faculty of History and Philosophy of the University of Latvia.

The German diplomat Michael Freiherr von Ungern-Sternberg was Ambassador and Permanent Representative of the Federal Republic of Germany to the United Nations in 2018-2021. Michael Freiherr is a grand-nephew of Roman von Ungern-Sternberg.

In July 2025, entrepreneur and social media influencer Leonie von Ungern-Sternberg drew public attention to the history of the Ungern-Sternberg family by posting on TikTok that she is a descendant of Roman von Ungern-Sternberg.

== Notable members ==
- Mattias Alexander von Ungern-Sternberg (1689–1763), lantmarskalk at the Swedish Riksdag of the Estates (1742, 1746)
- Anna Dorothea von Ungern-Sternberg (1769–1846), wife of Aleksey Grigorievich Bobrinsky
- Alexander von Ungern-Sternberg (1806–1869), Baltic German novelist, poet and painter
- Roman von Ungern-Sternberg (1886–1921), Russian general, White Movement warlord, Khan of Mongolia
- Erich von Ungern-Sternberg (1910–1989), Finnish architect
- Otto Reinhold Ludwig von Ungern-Sternberg, Baltic German aristocrat
- Michael Freiherr von Ungern-Sternberg, German Diplomat, former ambassador to Iran and Indonesia
- Maria Stella von Ungern-Sternberg, recognized by an ecclesiastical court a Princess of the Royal House of Orléans
- Jürgen von Ungern-Sternberg, German historian of antiquity

== Sources ==
- "Унгерн-Штернберг, графский и баронский род" . Brockhaus and Efron Encyclopedic Dictionary (in Russian). 1906.
- Jürgen von Ungern-Sternberg, "Narrating the History of Von Ungern-Sternberg Family," [Фон Унгерн-Штернберг овогийн түүхийн талаар өгүүлэхүй] in Монголын түүхэн дэх Барон Р.Ф. фон Унгерн-Штернберг (Baron R.F. von Ungern-Sternberg in Mongolian History), ed. O. Batsaikhan and S.L. Kuzmin, pp. 87-93, Ulaanbaatar: Bitpress, 2021 (in English).
- Sergius L. Kuzmin, Барон Унгерний түүх: Үнэнийг дахин сэргээсэн туршилт (A History of Baron Ungern: A Factual Reconstruction Experiment). Ulaanbaatar: Soyombo Printing, 2013 (in Mongolian).
