= Otto Reinhold Ludwig von Ungern-Sternberg =

Polish chamberlain and envoy as well as Baltic German shipowner and landowner

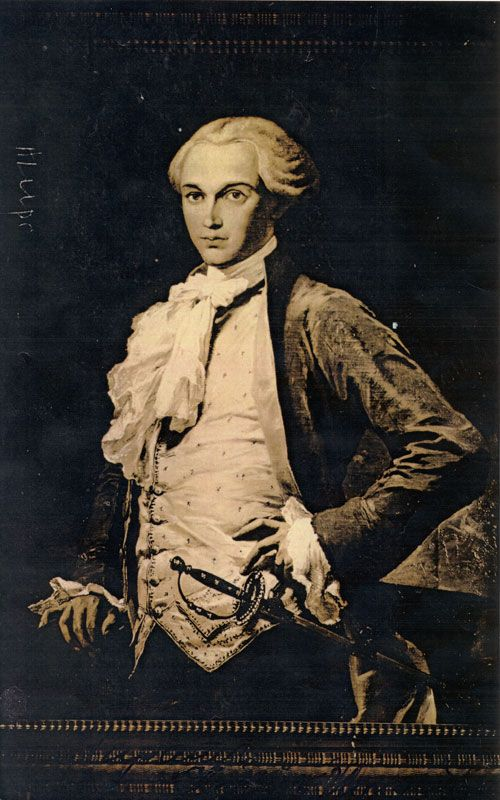
- Born: August 16, 1744; Vastse-Kuuste Parish,Poland-Lithuania
- Died: August 14, 1811 (aged 66); Tobolsk,Russian Empire
- Spouse: Maddalena Carlotta Pucci of Pitigliano (1772-1811)
- Children: Gustav Dietrich Otto; Magdalene; Peter Ludwig Konstantin; Heinrich Georg Eduard
- Parents: Reinhold Gustav von Ungern-Sternberg (father); Christina Sophia von Rosen (mother)
- Family: Ungern-Sternberg

Otto Reinhold Ludwig von Ungern-Sternberg was a Polish chamberlain and envoy as well as Baltic German shipowner and landowner.

His parents were Reinhold Gustav von Ungern-Sternberg (* 1714; † 1787) and his wife Christina Sophia von Rosen (* 1719; † 1797). Ungern studied at the University of Leipzig, traveled to Asia and the Indian Ocean. It is rumored that he could endanger the trade and transport monopoly of the British East India Company, he was arrested by the authorities of British India during the Seven Years' War. He was accused of espionage and deported to Europe. However, Russian historian Sergious Kuzmin and German historian Jürgen von Ungern-Sternberg claim that Otto Reinhold Ludwig was neither present in the Indian Ocean nor a famous pirate.

He was chamberlain and envoy of Stanislaus II August Poniatowski to the Tsar Catherine the Great at Peterhof Palace. In 1781 he acquired the Gutshof Großenhof on Dagö, continued to be Lord at Neukusthof in Livonia as well as at Neuenhof, Hohenholm, Pardas and Putkas in Estonia. Ungern had the rank of Dutch captain. In 1802 he was arrested on charges of murdering Carl Johan Malmi, captain of the brig Morian. At trial he pleaded self-defense. He was convicted and exiled to Tobolsk. There he worked in administration during the reign of Emperor Alexander I.

Otto was posthumously declared a robber in the United Kingdom. István Csekey scientifically investigated the accusation of piracy against Ungern in 1928 and conducted it ad absurdum.

== Family and Offspring ==
Ungern had been married to the Italian countess Maddalena Carlotta Pucci of Pitigliano (* 1749; † 1824) since 1772, with whom he had four children:

- Gustav Dietrich Otto von Ungern-Sternberg (1773–1800), Russian military officer (captain). Died due to careless handling of a weapon, probably a suicide caused by debt.
- Magdalene von Ungern-Sternberg (1777–1840),she married in 1793 the baron of Riisipere: Peter Gustav von Stackelberg (1762–1826).
- Peter Ludwig Konstantin von Ungern-Sternberg (1779–1836), lord of Hiiu-Suuremõisa, Võnnu, Jõesse, Ehmja, Keskvere, Tagavere, Undla, Nõva, Alavere, Hüüru and Harku Manor, he was a Russian military officer.
- Heinrich Georg Eduard von Ungern-Sternberg (1782–1861), lord of Kõrgessaare and Nõva, he was a Russian military officer.

The famous warlord Roman von Ungern-Sternberg is descended from Otto Reinhold Ungern-Sternberg.
