= Ingliste =

Village in Estonia

Coordinates: 59°00′48″N 24°56′49″E

- Village
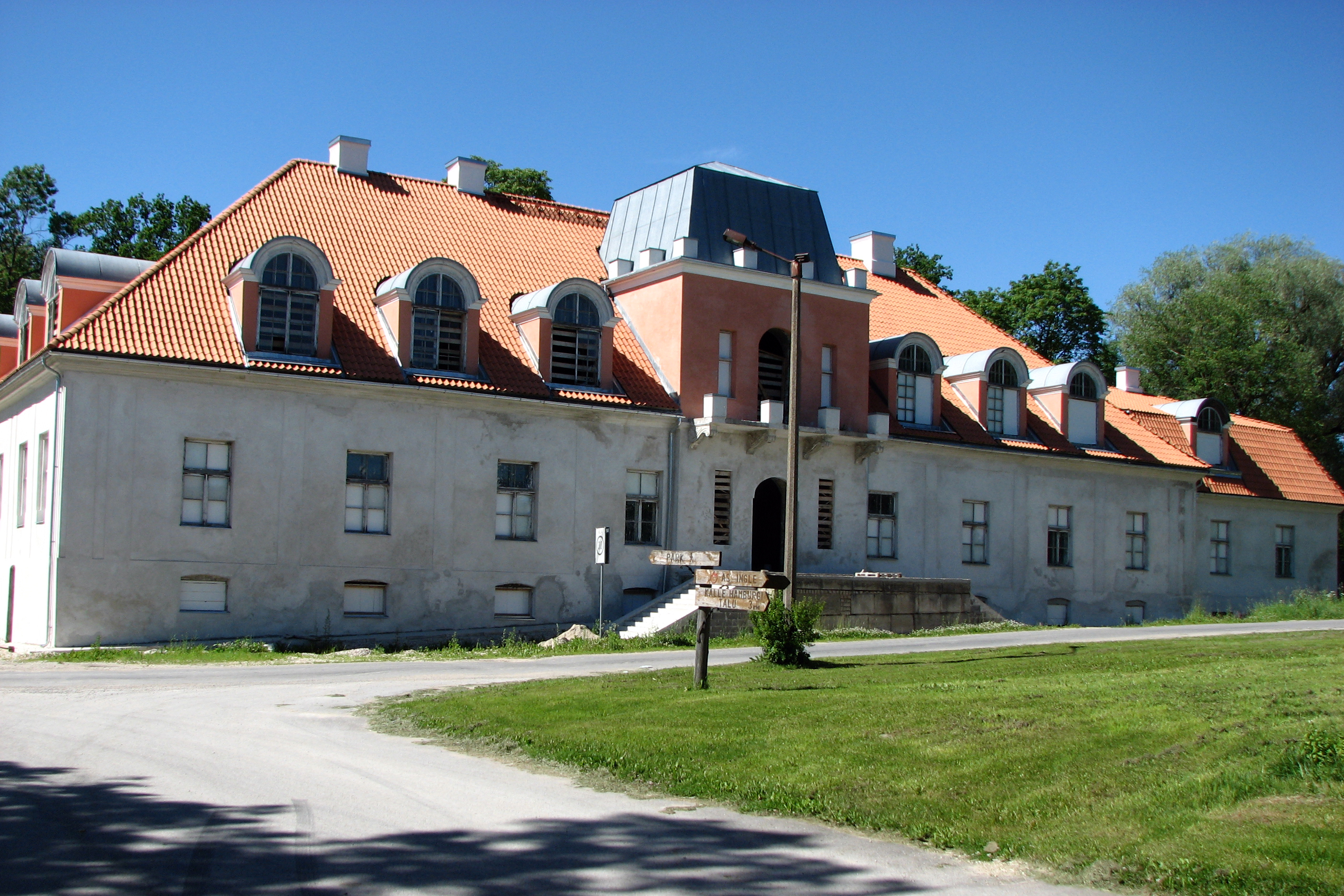
- Ingliste Manor
- Interactive map of Ingliste
- Country: Estonia
- County: Rapla County
- Parish: Kehtna Parish
- Time zone: UTC+2 (EET)
  - Summer (DST): UTC+3 (EEST)

Ingliste (German: Haehl) is a village in Kehtna Parish, Rapla County in northern-central Estonia.
