= Henrik von Rehbinder =

Swedish general

Henrik von Rehbinder (1604–1680) was a Swedish soldier and freiherr of the Udriku estate in Swedish Estonia.

== Biography ==
He was born on 8 October 1604 in Livland. In 1622 he became a weapon page to Gustavus Adolphus of Sweden, then he was a captain in Queen Kristina's honor guard. He was promoted to major general in the cavalry, a commanding officer for the Finnish militia, and later the governor of the Finland. He was raised to nobility as Baron on 12 February 1680. He participated in the Battle of Luetzen in 1632, and he died on 13 October 1680 in Stockholm. He was buried in Värmdö in the church, in a decorated and engraved copper coffin. Henrik Rehbinder, neutralized and baron Rehbinder, b. in Livland 8 Oct 1604. Arms page at Gustav II Adolf 1622. Lieutenant in colonel Grass' infantry regiment 1632, in colonel Otto Yxkull-Gyllenband's cavalry regiment 1638. Cavalry captain in queen Kristina's Mounted Life Guards 1648, major 1648, discharge from the Army 1650. Lieutenant colonel in field marshal baron Gust. Lewenhaupt's Mounted Life Guards 1655, colonel Apr 1656. Naturalized Swedish nobleman 11 Aug 1668 (introduced in the old calendar under nr 713). Major general of the Cavalry and chief of the Finnish Military and governor of Finland 26 Jun 1673. Baron 12 Feb 1680 (introd. s.y.). Was besides owner of numerous estates in Sweden and Uddrich and Wagenküll in Estonia, also owner of Viljakkala in Tavastkyrö (Hämeenkyrö) and Kavantholm in S:t Andree. Death in Stockholm 13 Oct 1680, buried in Nikolai church in Stockholm in a copper coffin decorated with inscriptions and escutcheon, but was some year later placed in the family grave at the church in Värmdö. 'He followed as page king Gustav II Adolf with zeal and faithfulness in the Polish and German wars until the death of the king; he was an excellent soldier and he got in the battle of Wittstock eighteen severe wounds; he beat during the war in Poland in the 1650th (1655) with his regiment 5.000 Poles, during which he captured two colonels, 60 officers and 520 ranks and he defended then Riga bravely against the Russian by sally and by taking prisoners and victory symbols; he got at raising to the baronial rank his heart escutcheon increased by ten golden stars in memory of his ten sons, of which seven was then alive and all of them had allowed courageously to be used in the service of the State.

== Family ==
He was married to Hildegard von Uexküll from Vigala and later married to Anna Bure. He had 18 children in all. 5 children died young. 4 brothers died in battle, in Poland and Germany.
