= Ruusmäe =

Village in Estonia

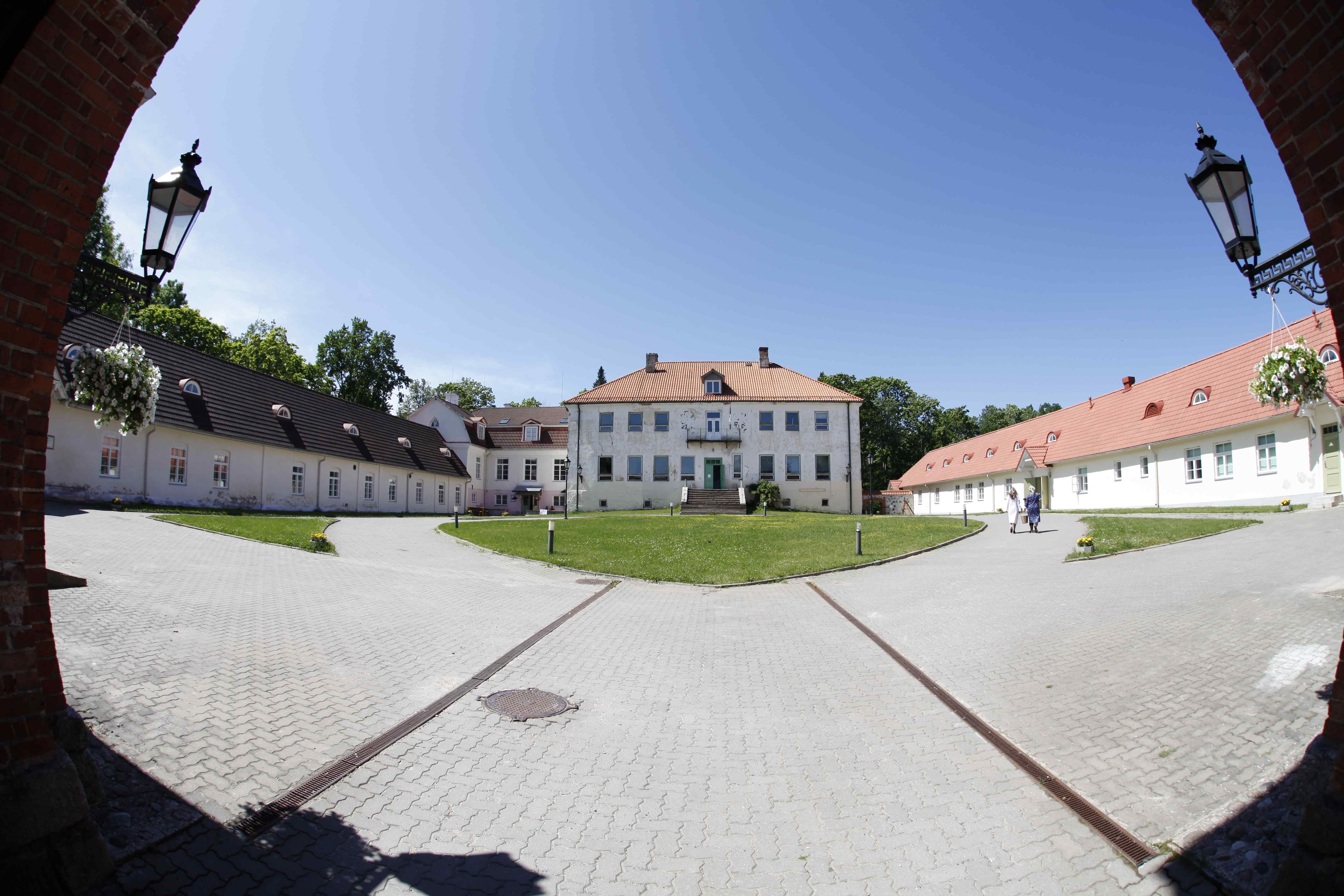
- Rogosi manor in Ruusmäe village, view from the courtyard

- Location within Estonia
- Coordinates: 57°38′24″N 27°5′3″E
- Country: Estonia
- County: Võru County
- Municipality: Rõuge Parish
- Time zone: UTC+2 (EET)

Ruusmäe is a village in Rõuge Parish, Võru County, in southeastern Estonia. From 1991 to 2017 (until the administrative reform of Estonian municipalities) it was in Haanja Parish. The former name of the settlement was Rogosi, which came from the name Rogoziński. In 1939, during the Estonianization campaign, it was renamed Ruusmäe.

== Rogosi manor ==
Rogosi estate (German: Rogosinsky) in Ruusmäe village was founded circa 1600, during the Polish time, by the Polish nobleman Stanisław Rogoziński. This first edifice was probably made of wood and smaller than the presently visible main building.

The estate belonged to the von Liepsdorff family between 1629 and 1776, and during their ownership the current building was constructed. It was heavily reconstructed in the 19th century, when it belonged to the von Glasenapp family. In 1918–20 the estate was nationalised during the sweeping land reforms that followed the Estonian Declaration of Independence. The son of the last owner, Guido von Glasenapp, was given compensation in the form of another farm in recognition for his service during the Estonian War of Independence. The manor was, however, left empty and fell into ruins during the 1920s. In 1930–34, it was renovated and put into use as a school. A restoration was carried out in 1989–1991 and again in 1999.

The manor is open to the public and houses a school, guest house, and a local museum.

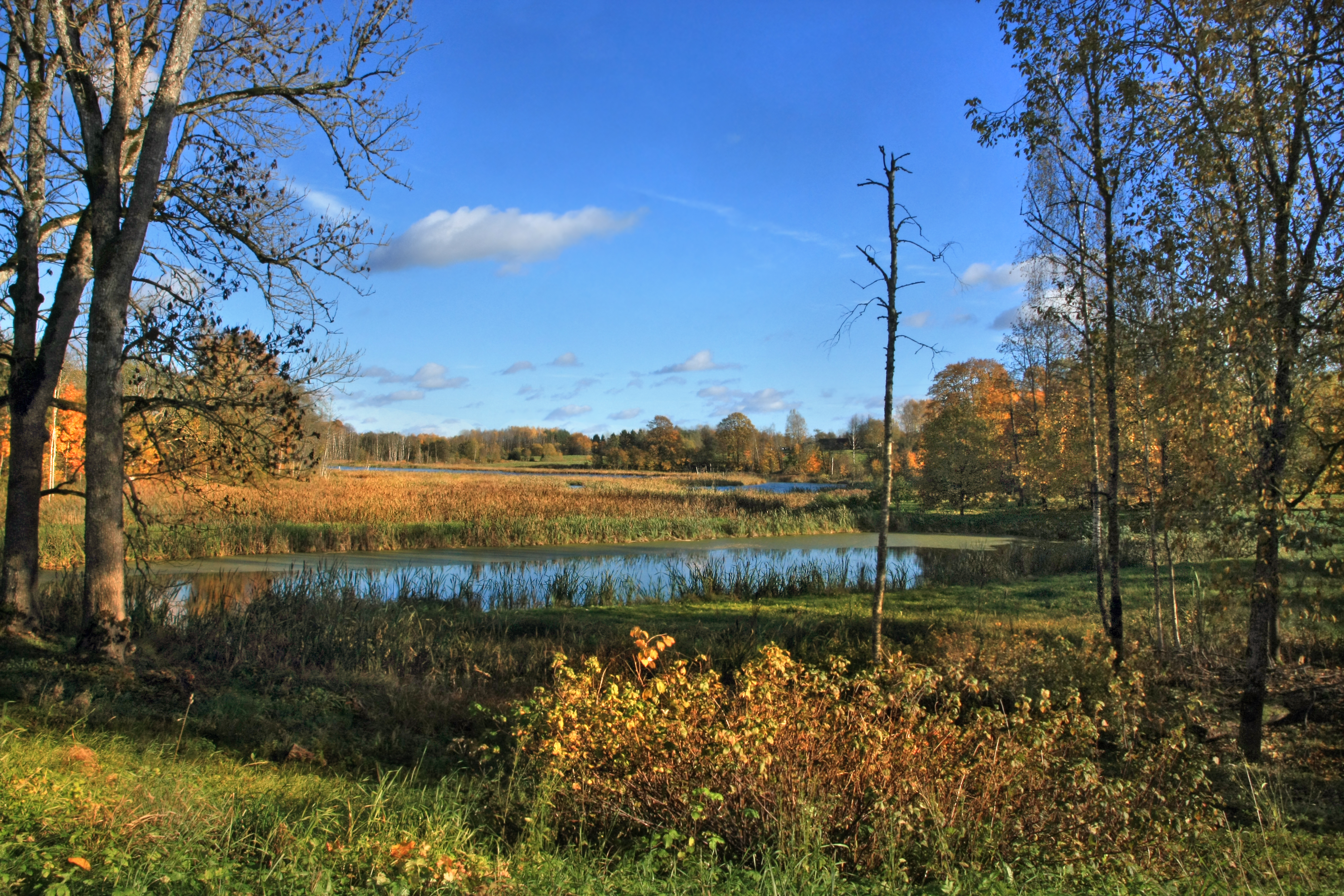
A lake near the village
