= Joseph Carl von Anrep =

Russian general (1798–1860)

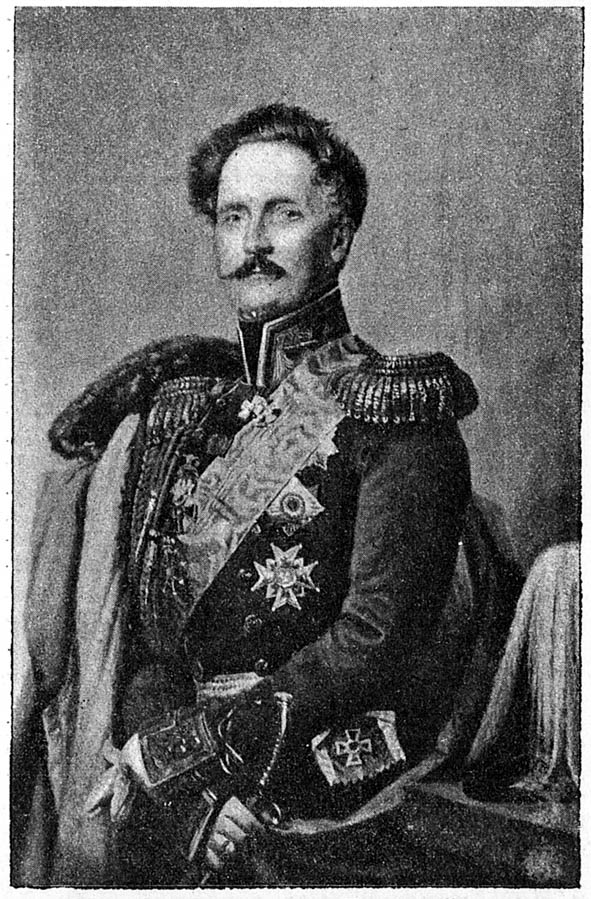
- Born: 6 February 1798
- Died: June 28, 1860 (aged 62); Russia
- Military career
- Allegiance: Russia
- Branch: Imperial Russian Army
- Service years: 1815–1860
- Rank: General of the Cavalry
- Conflicts: Russo-Turkish War; November Uprising; Hungarian Campaign; Crimean War
- Awards: Order of St. Anna; Order of St. George; Order of St. Vladimir

Joseph Carl von Anrep (Russian: Иосиф Романович Анреп, romanized: Iosif Romanovich Anrep-Elmpt; 6 February 1798 – 28 June 1860) was a Baltic German general during the Crimean War. He was a member of the Russian branch of the Anrep family, the son of Heinrich Reinhold von Anrep, a general of the Russian cavalry during the Napoleonic Wars.

== Biography ==
Anrep married Cecelia [Cäcilie] Julie Philippine Elmpt zu Burgau. On 6 May 1853, by edict of the Tzar, he was styled Count Anrep-Elmpt in order to preserve the title of his wife's grandfather, Count von Elmpt, who had no other heir. At the start of the Crimean War, Anrep was a colonel in Russian army, but he was quickly promoted to general. He commanded the Russian troops at the siege of Calafat. Anrep died in 1860. He was the owner of Kärstna manor in present-day Estonia. His son, Reinhold von Anrep-Elmpt, was an explorer.

== Sources ==
- "Анрепы-Эльмпты графы и Анрепы дворяне" . Brockhaus and Efron Encyclopedic Dictionary (in Russian). 1906.
