= Sõmeru Parish =

Former municipality of Estonia

Coordinates: 59°23′N 26°26′E

Sõmeru Parish Sõmeru vald
- Former municipality of Estonia
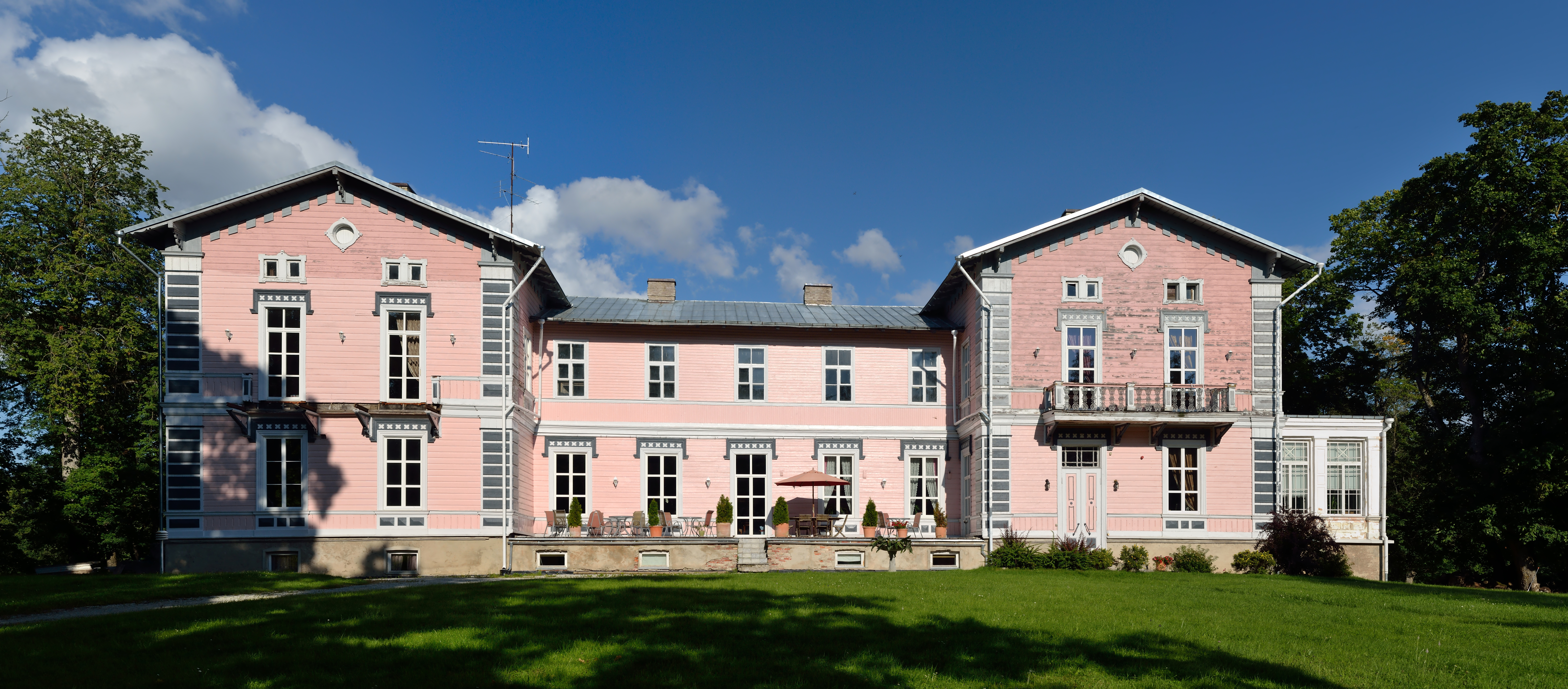
- Kohala manor

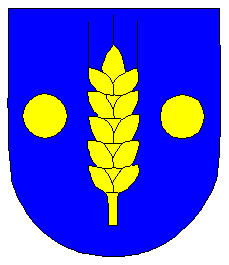
- Flag Coat of arms

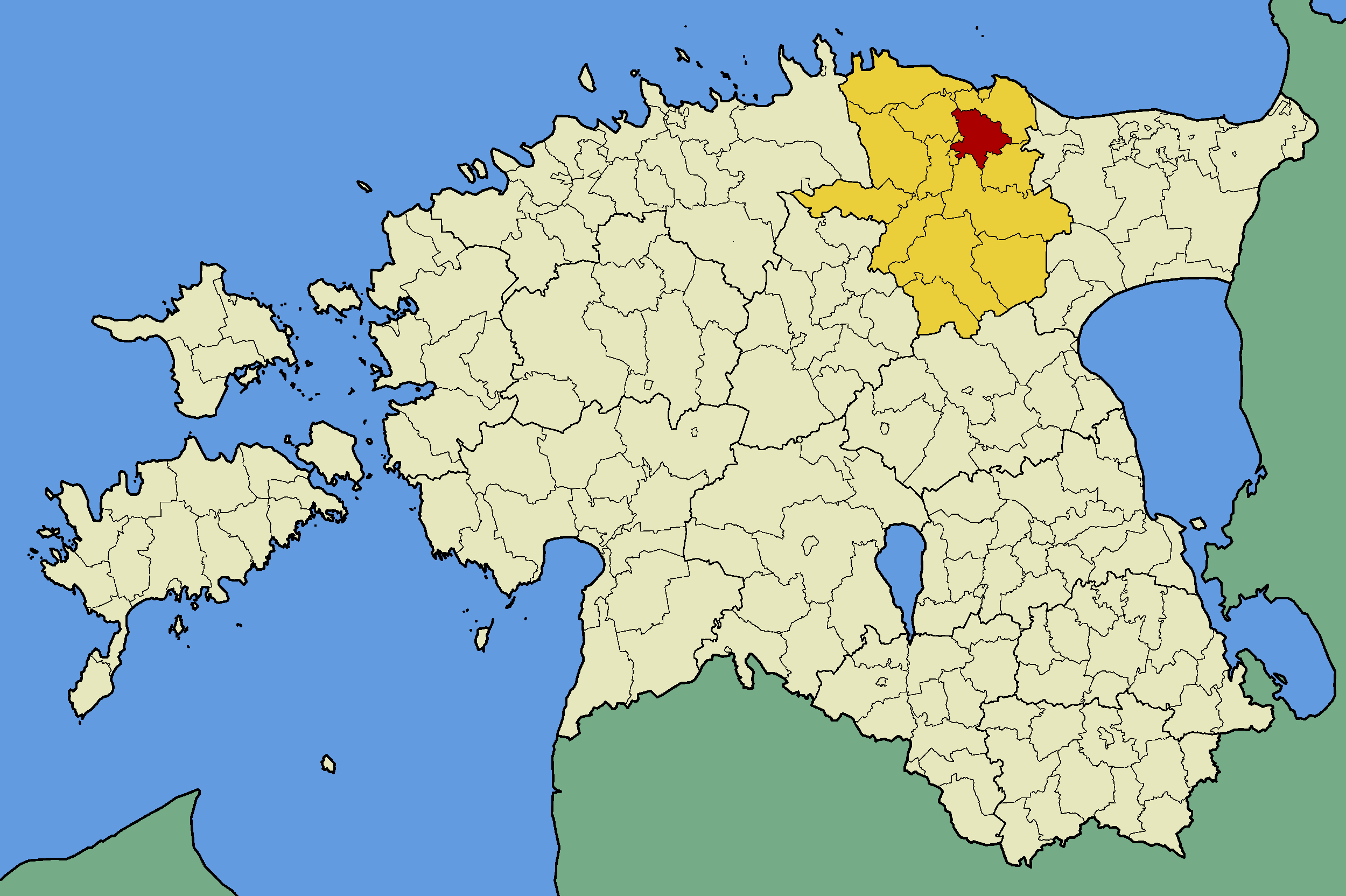
- Sõmeru Parish within Lääne-Viru County.
- Country: Estonia
- County: Lääne-Viru County
- Administrative centre: Sõmeru

Area
  - Total: 168.29 km^{2} (64.98 sq mi)

Population (2006)
  - Total: 3,885
  - Density: 23.09/km^{2} (59.79/sq mi)
- Website: www.someru.ee

Sõmeru Parish (Estonian: Sõmeru vald) was a rural municipality of Estonia, in Lääne-Viru County. It had a population of 3,885 (2006) and an area of 168.29 km².

== Settlements ==
Sõmeru Parish had 3 small boroughs, Näpi, Sõmeru and Uhtna and 28 villages: Aluvere, Andja, Aresi, Jäätma, Kaarli, Katela, Katku, Kohala, Kohala-Eesküla, Koovälja, Muru, Nurme, Papiaru, Rahkla, Raudlepa, Raudvere, Roodevälja, Rägavere, Sooaluse, Sämi, Sämi-Tagaküla, Toomla, Ubja, Ussimäe, Vaeküla, Varudi-Altküla, Varudi-Vanaküla, Võhma.

== People ==
Sõmeru Parish is the birthplace of artist Endel Ruberg (1917–1989).
