= Tagaküla =

Tagaküla may refer to several places in Estonia:

- Tagaküla, Harju County, village in Viimsi Parish, Harju County, on the island of Naissaar
- Tagaküla, Võru County, village in Võru Parish, Võru County

== See also ==
- Sämi-Tagaküla, village in Rakvere Parish, Lääne-Viru County
