= Papiaru =

Papiaru may refer to several places in Estonia:

- Papiaru, Lääne-Viru County, village in Rakvere Parish, Lääne-Viru County
- Papiaru, Tartu County, village in Peipsiääre Parish, Tartu County
