= Jarni =

Jarni may refer to:

- Robert Jarni (born 1968), Croatian footballer
- Järni, a village in Estonia
- Jarní píseň, a 1944 Czechoslovak film
- Jarní vody, a 1968 Czechoslovak film
