= Rakvere Parish =

Municipality of Estonia (2017)

Coordinates: 59°21′N 26°18′E

Rakvere Parish Rakvere vald
- Municipality of Estonia
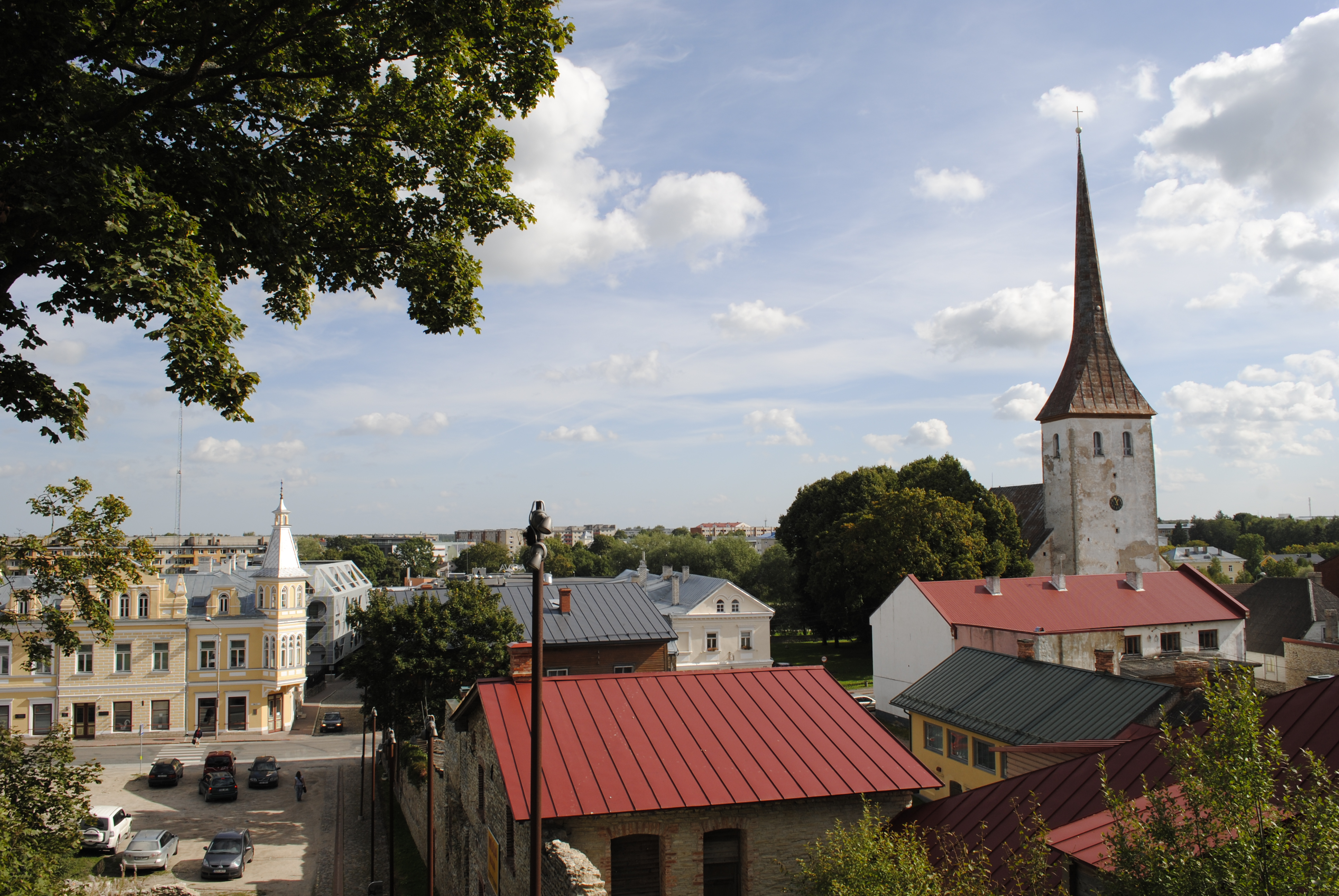
- View of the town of Rakvere

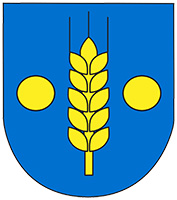
- Flag Coat of arms

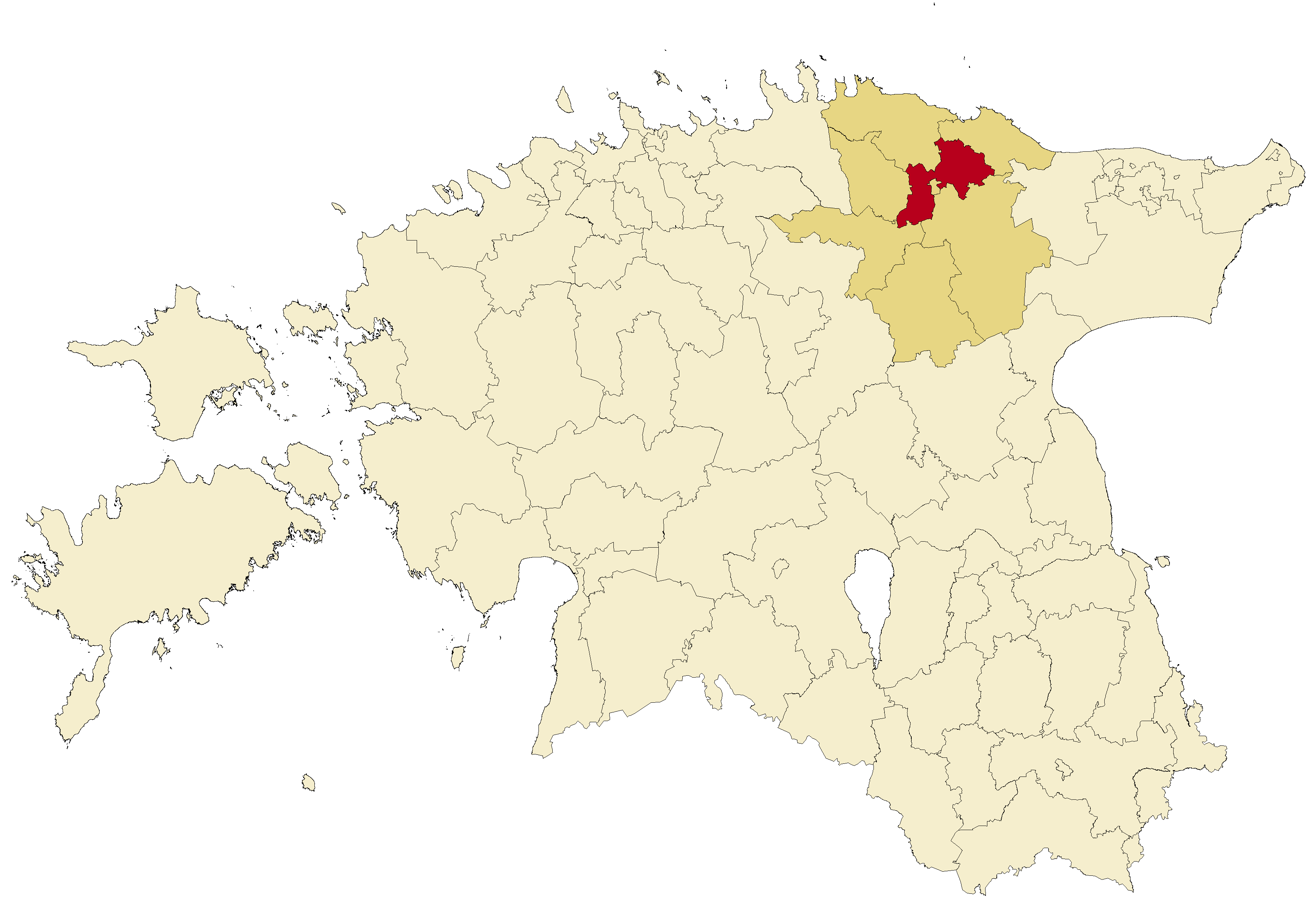
- Rakvere Parish within Lääne-Viru County
- Country: Estonia
- County: Lääne-Viru County
- Administrative centre: Sõmeru

Government
  - Mayor of the municipality: Maido Nõlvak

Area
  - Total: 295 km^{2} (114 sq mi)

Population (2021)
  - Total: 5,619
  - Density: 19.0/km^{2} (49.3/sq mi)
- ISO 3166 code: EE-661
- Website: www.rakverevald.ee

Rakvere Parish (Estonian: Rakvere vald) is a rural municipality of Estonia, in Lääne-Viru County. Rakvere municipality surrounds the city of Rakvere and is located in north east Estonia. The shape of the municipality resembles a butterfly. Rakvere Parish is one of the smallest local governments in Estonia in terms of population, being the 54th largest local government (in Estonia is 79 local governments).

== Settlements ==
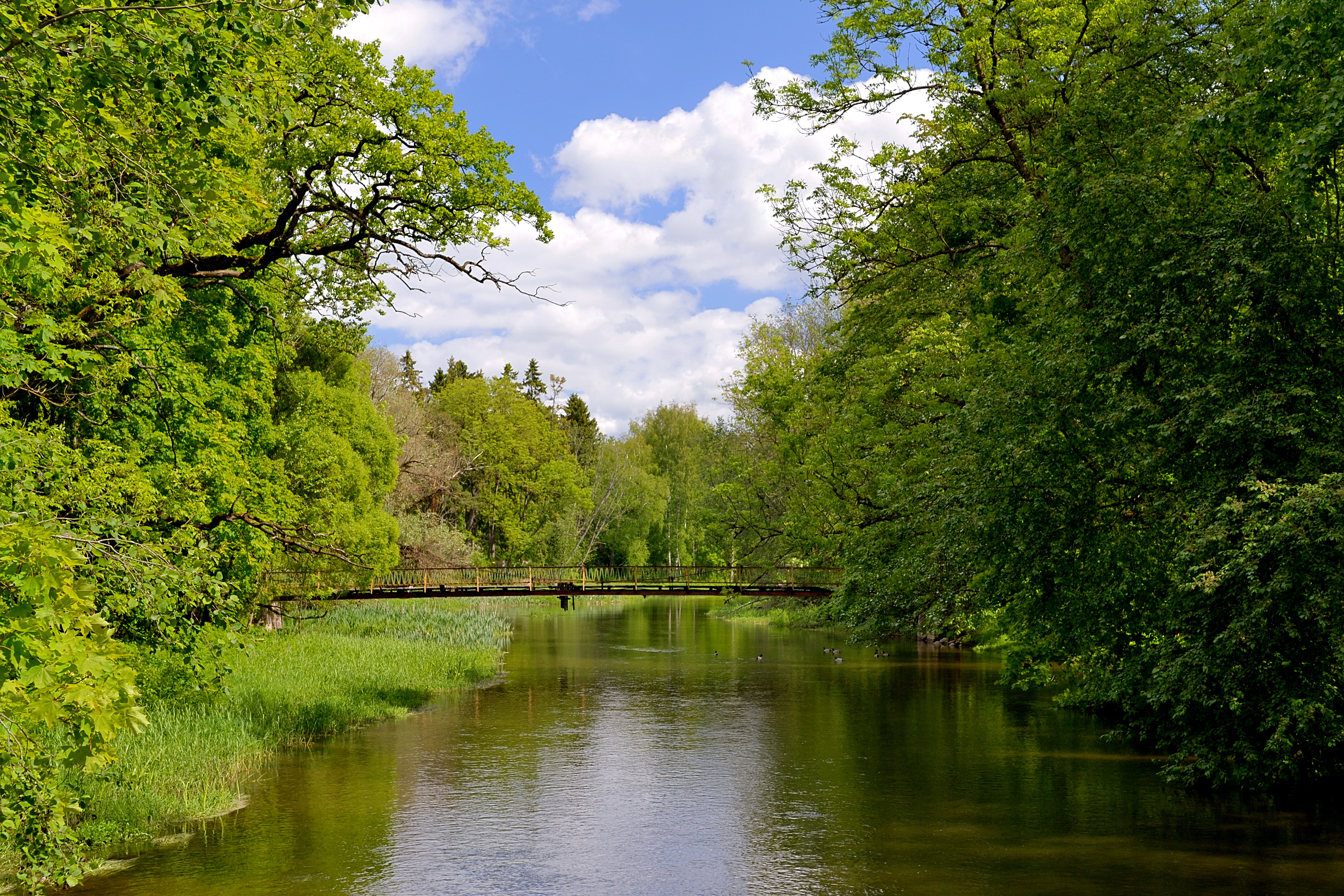
Selja river in Arkna

Rakvere Parish has 4 small boroughs and 47 villages.

Small boroughs

Lepna, Näpi, Sõmeru and Uhtna

Villages

Aluvere, Andja, Aresi, Arkna, Eesküla, Järni, Jäätma, Kaarli, Karitsa, Karivärava, Karunga, Katela, Katku, Kloodi, Kohala, Kohala-Eesküla, Koovälja, Kullaaru, Kõrgemäe, Lasila, Levala, Muru, Mädapea, Nurme, Paatna, Papiaru, Päide, Rahkla, Raudlepa, Raudvere, Roodevälja, Rägavere, Sooaluse, Sämi, Sämi-Tagaküla, Taaravainu, Tobia, Toomla, Tõrma, Tõrremäe, Ubja, Ussimäe, Vaeküla, Varudi-Altküla, Varudi-Vanaküla, Veltsi and Võhma

== Religion ==
Religion in Rakvere Rural Parish (2021)
1. Unaffiliated (86.7%)
2. Lutheran (8.00%)
3. Orthodox (2.70%)
4. Other Christians (0.60%)
5. Other religions or unknown (2.10%)

== Geography ==
Rakvere Parish is a parish with diverse landscape and landforms. There are karst areas, karst rivers and beautiful natural stands. Two rivers - Selja and Kunda - pass through municipality. In the municipality is lake Päide.

== Transport ==
Tallinn-Narva highway passes the municipality. This highway is part of the European route E20. The Tallinn–Narva railway also passes the municipality, but the closest train station is in Rakvere. By bus is also the best connection with Rakvere.

The closest cargo port is in Kunda.

== Main landmarks ==
In the municipality are eight manors that are mostly privately owned: Rägavere, Vaeküla, Uhtna, Kohala, Arkna, Mädapea, Lasila, and Kloodi.

== Notable people ==
- Karl Leichter (1902 in Näpi – 1987), musicologist, worked in Estonian Folklore Archives, 1929 to 1931
- Endel Ruberg (1917 in Virumaa – 1989), an Estonian-Canadian artist, naturalist, and humanitarian.
- Arved-Ervin Sapar (1933 in Paatna – 2021), a theoretical astrophysicist and cosmologist.
- Tanel Padar (born 1980 in Uhtna), singer and songwriter, he won the Eurovision Song Contest 2001.
