= Kullaaru =

Village in Estonia

Coordinates: 59°21′N 26°19′E

- Village
- Interactive map of Kullaaru
- Country: Estonia
- County: Lääne-Viru County
- Parish: Rakvere Parish
- Time zone: UTC+2 (EET)
  - Summer (DST): UTC+3 (EEST)

Kullaaru is a village in Rakvere Parish, Lääne-Viru County, in northeastern Estonia.

== Name ==
Kullaaru was attested in historical sources as Kulla Arro Jahn and Kulla Arro Jürgen in 1716, and Kullarro Jahn in 1726 (all of these referring to peasants belonging to Kloodi Manor), as well as Arro in 1796 (referring to the manor's dairy farm). The name probably originally referred to a natural feature. The name first denoted a farm, which became Kloodi Manor's dairy farm in the 18th century, was eventually separated from that manor, and developed into a separate village with its own small manor.

== Notable people ==
Notable people that were born or lived in Kullaaru include the following:

- Eduard Bornhöhe (1862–1923), writer, born in Kullaaru Manor
