= Uhtna =

Village in Estonia

- Small borough
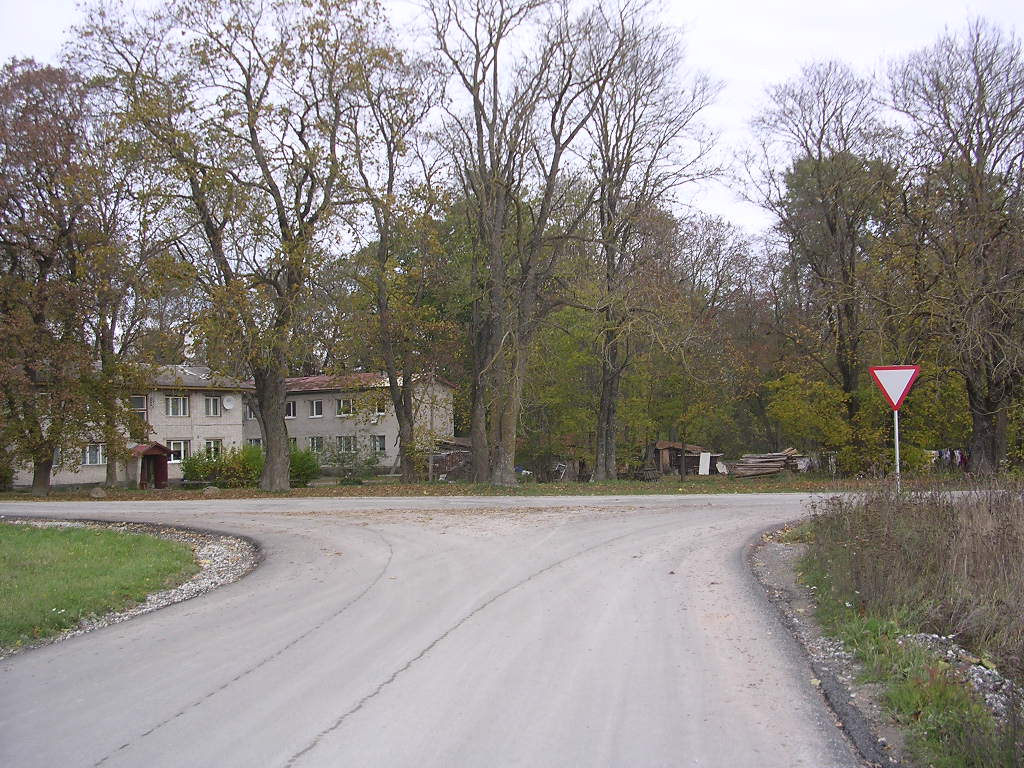

- Location in Estonia
- Coordinates: 59°23′40″N 26°33′55″E
- Country: Estonia
- County: Lääne-Viru County
- Municipality: Rakvere Parish

Area
  - Total: 4.8 km^{2} (1.9 sq mi)

Population (01.01.2020)
  - Total: 304

Uhtna (German: Uchten) is a small borough in Rakvere Parish, Lääne-Viru County, Estonia. Prior to the 2017 administrative reform of Estonian municipalities, Uhtna was part of Sõmeru Parish.

The village is bisected by the Kunda river. Uhtna manor and estate, established in 1489, is located in Uhtna.

== Gallery ==
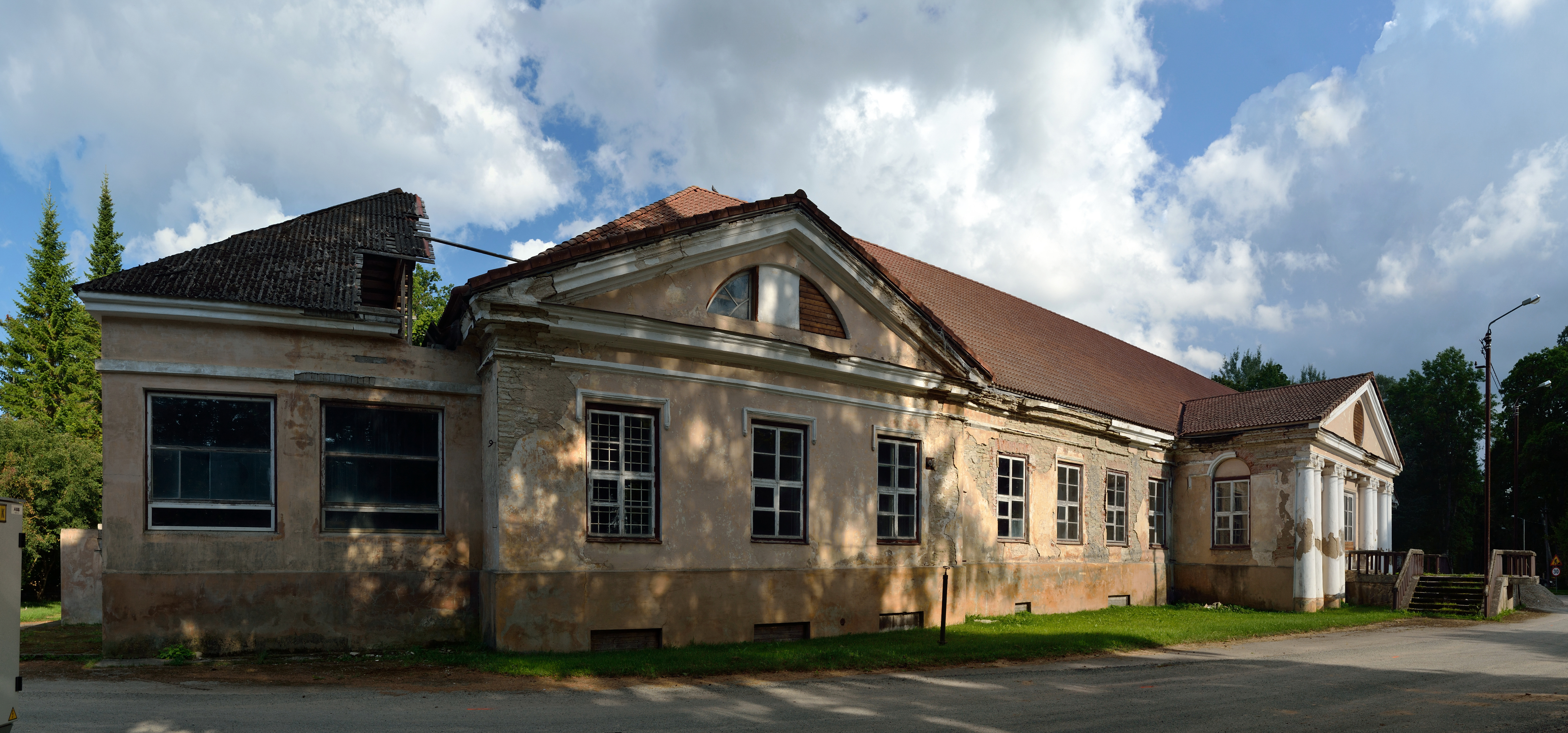
Uhtna manor main building in 2012, prior to restoration

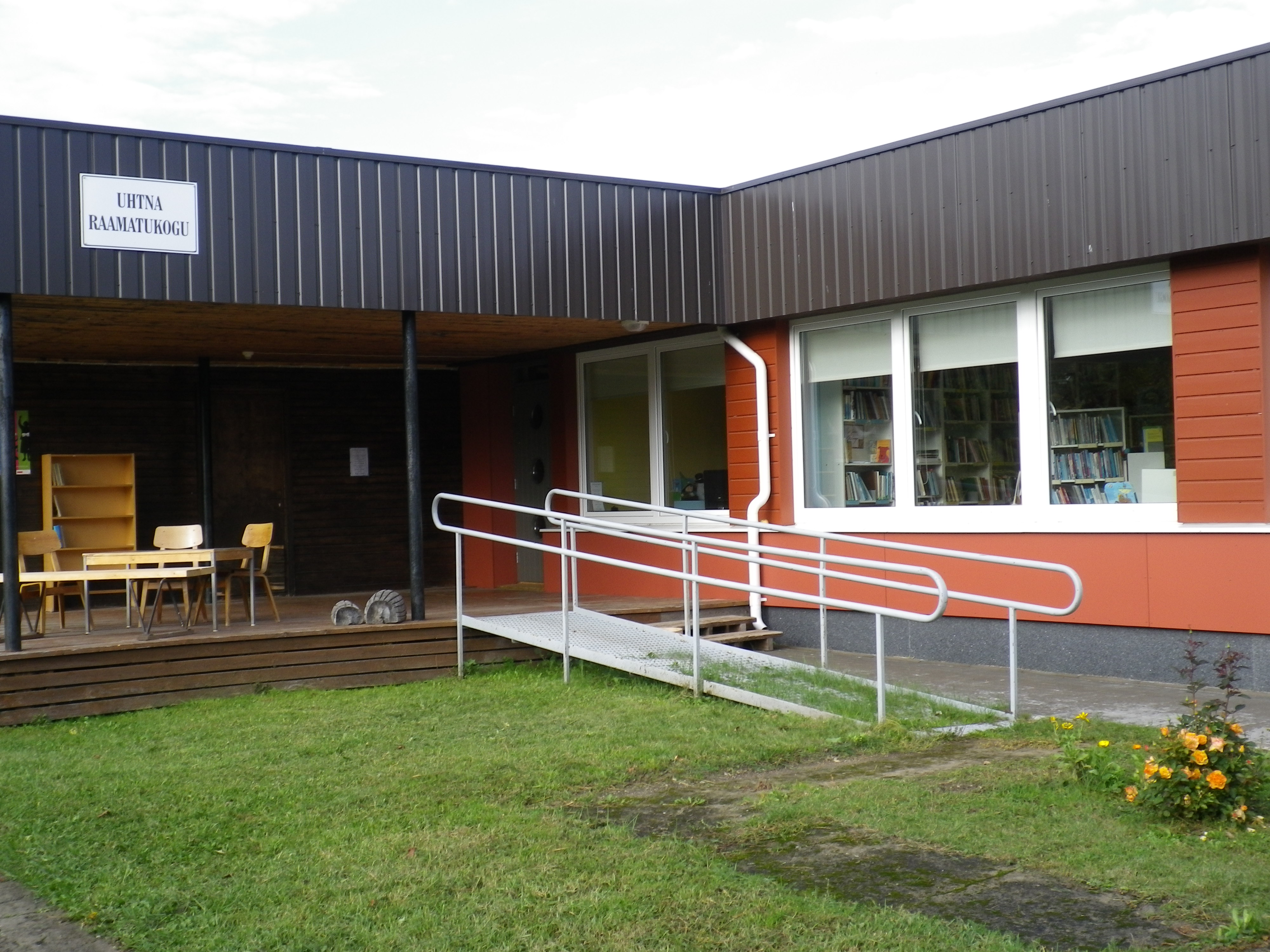
Uhtna library

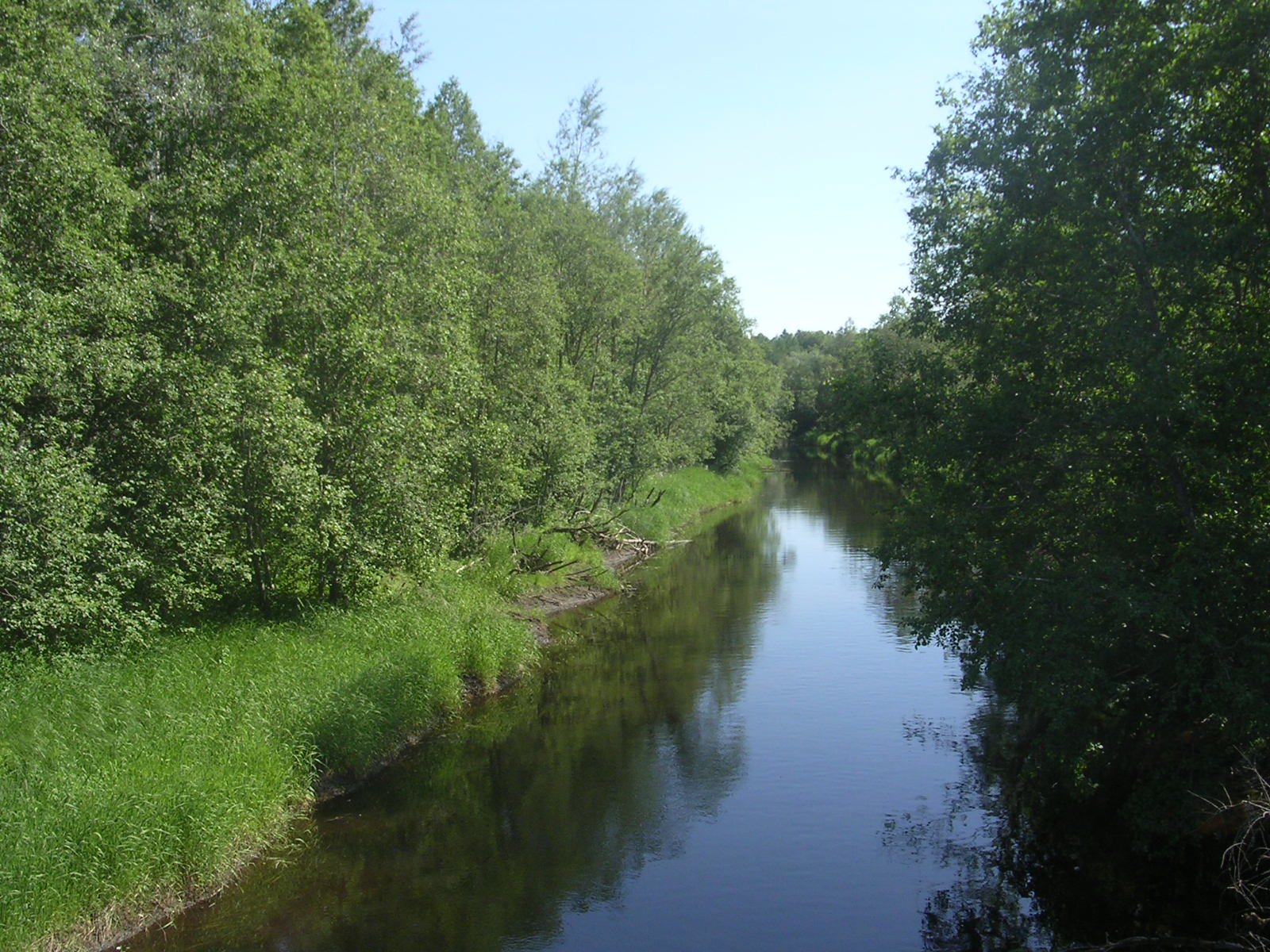
Kunda river in Uhtna

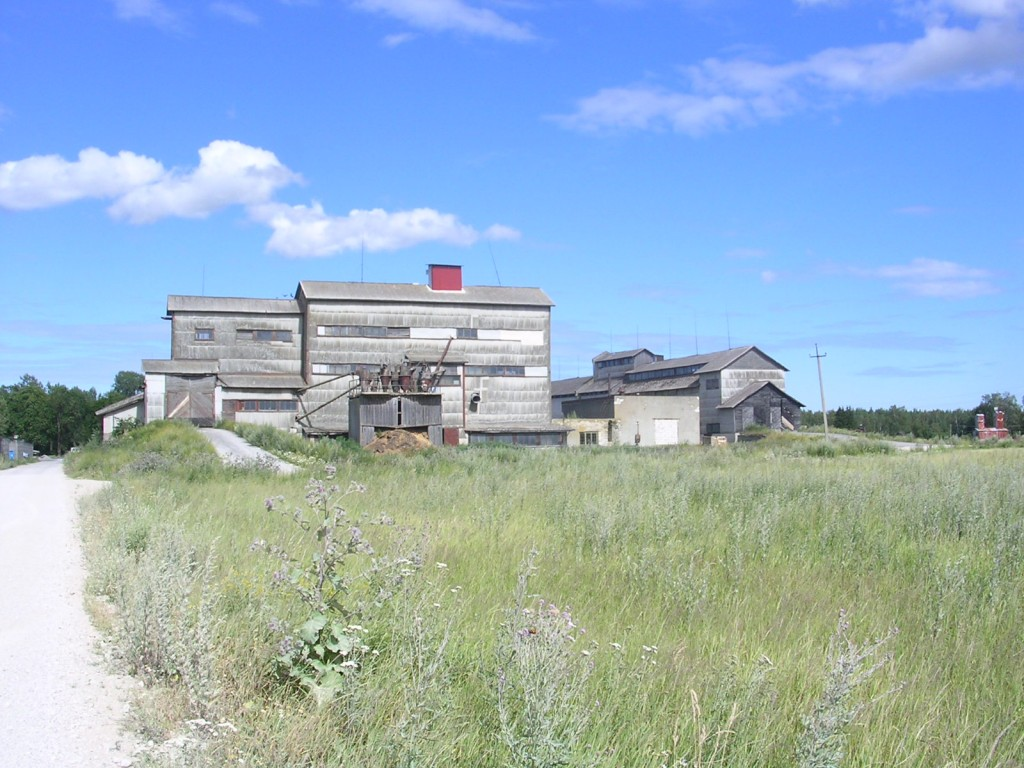
Grain dryer in Uhtna

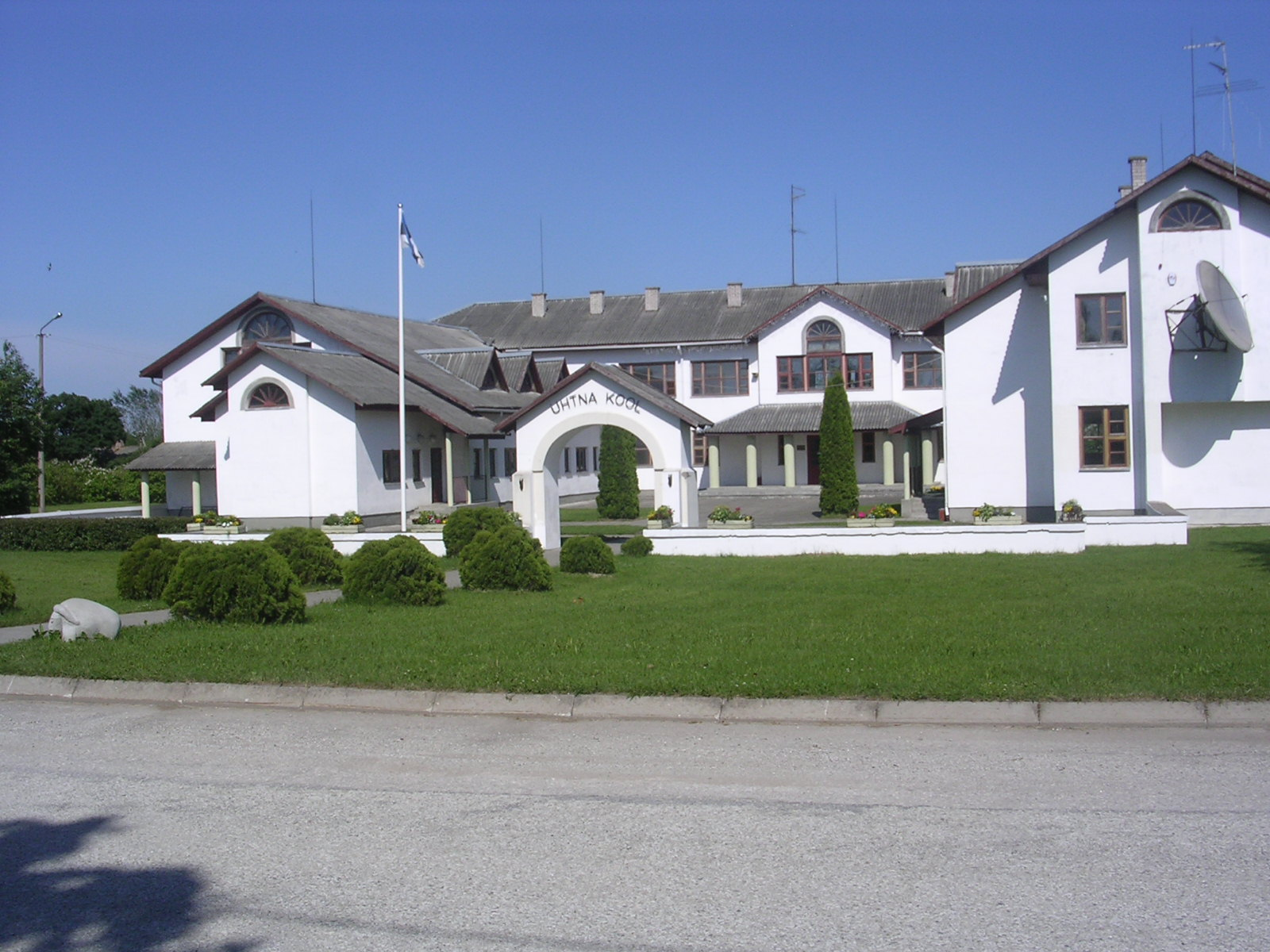
Uhtna School

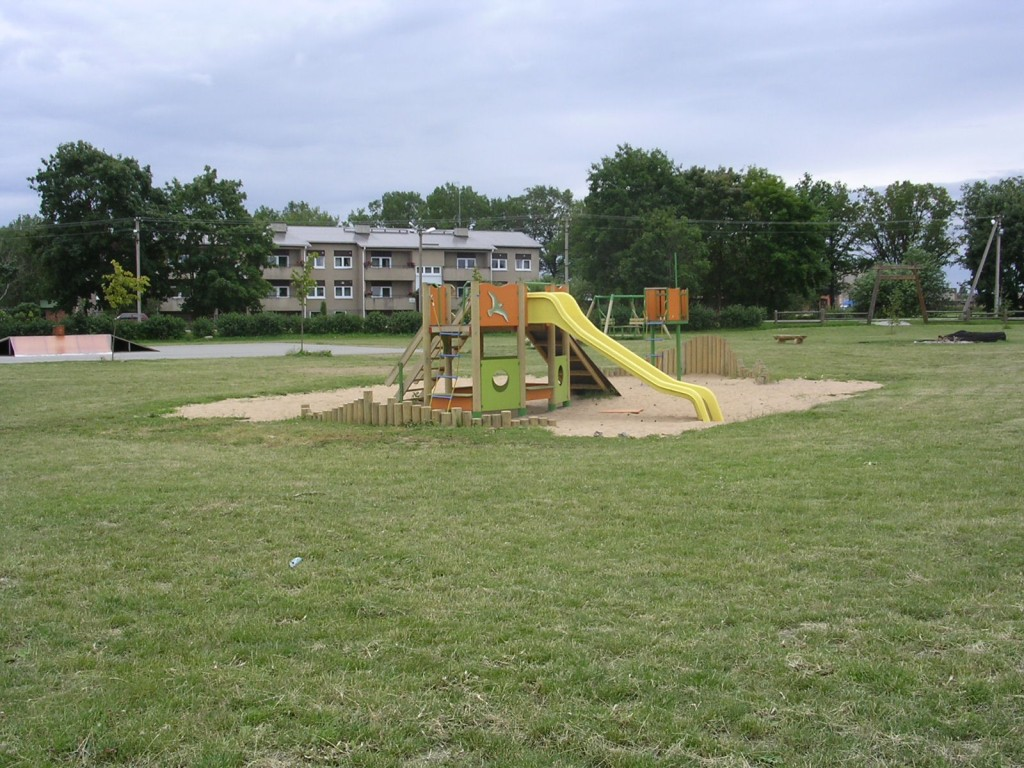
Apartments in Uhtna and playground

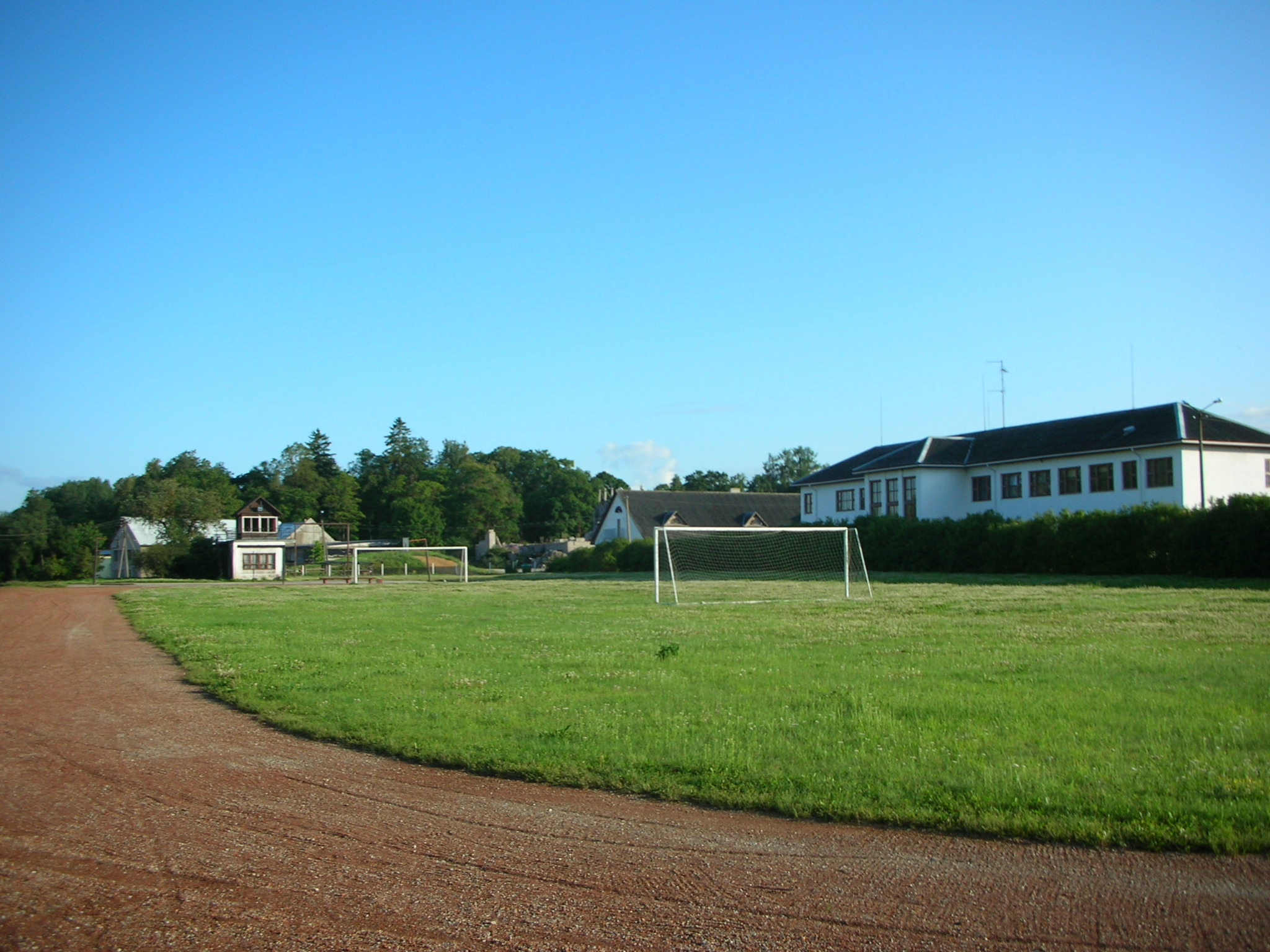
Uhtna stadium

Winter panorama
