= Kaarli =

Kaarli may refer to several places in Estonia:

- Kaarli, Lääne-Viru County, village in Estonia
- Kaarli, Viljandi County, village in Estonia
