= Hans Rebane =

Estonian politician, diplomat and journalist

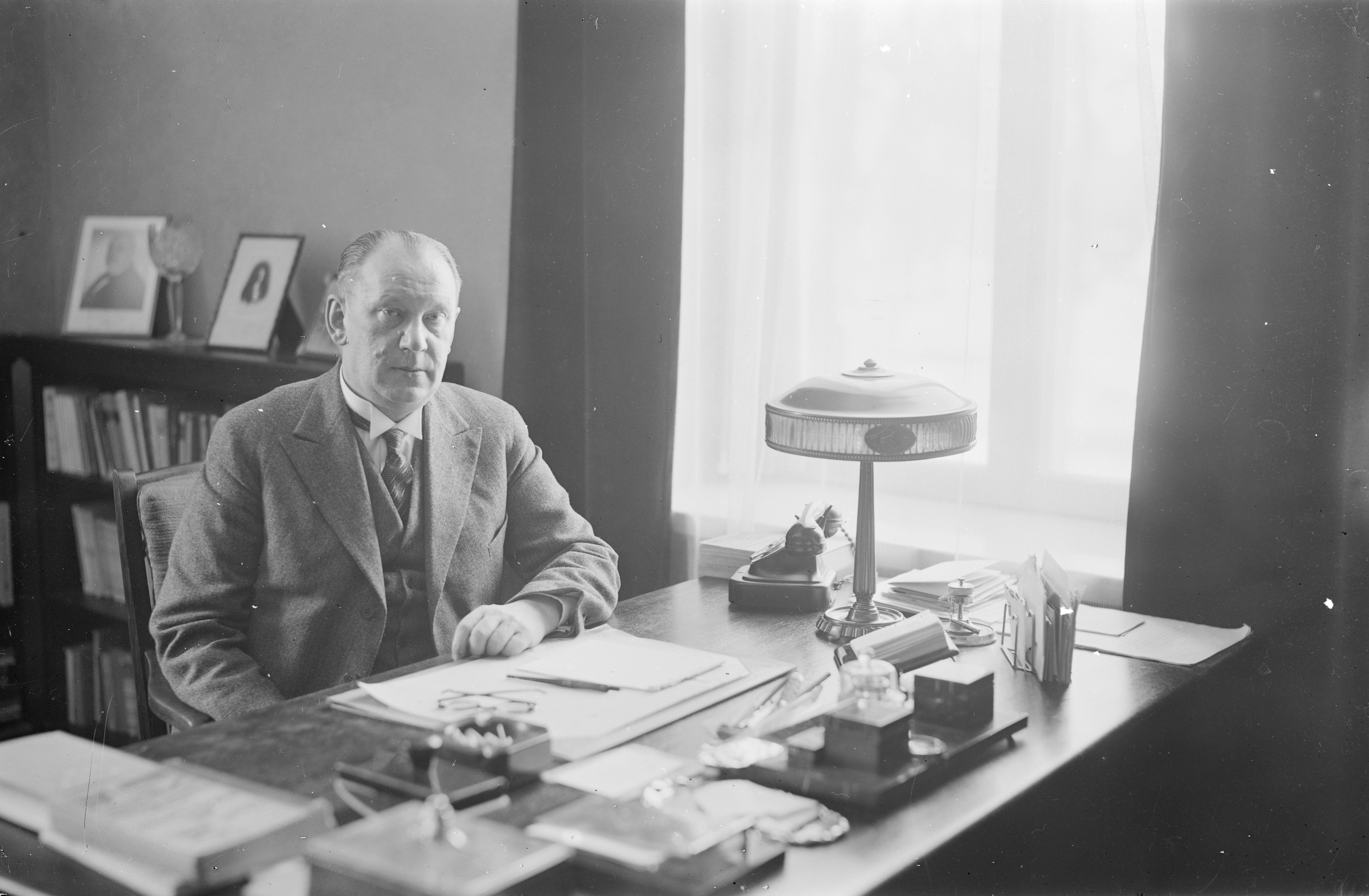
Hans Rebane (1934)

Hans Rebane (24 December [O.S. 12 December] 1882 – 16 December 1961) was an Estonian politician, diplomat and journalist. He served as the Minister of Foreign Affairs of Estonia from 1927 to 1928 in Jaan Tõnisson's third cabinet. Rebane was Estonian envoy in Helsinki 1931–1937, 1937–1940 in Riga.

Hans Rebane was born in Ärma farmstead, Halliste Parish (now in Veskimäe, Viljandi Parish), Viljandi County. The same farm is now owned by the former Estonian President Toomas Hendrik Ilves who uses it as his residence.

Hans Rebane studied medicine in the University of Tartu and later economics in Berlin.

He died in Stockholm.

Political offices
Preceded by Aleksander Hellat	Minister of Foreign Affairs of Estonia; 1927–1928	Succeeded by Jaan Lattik
Preceded by Eduard Virgo	Estonian Minister in Helsinki; 1931–1937	Succeeded by Rudolf Möllerson
Preceded by Karl Menning	Estonian Minister in Riga; 1937–1940	Succeeded by (Soviet occupation)
