= Eduard Virgo =

Estonian journalist, diplomat, and translator

Eduard-Reinhold Virgo (16 October 1878 Päide village, Rakvere Parish – 28 April 1938 Tallinn) was an Estonian journalist, diplomat, and translator.

From 1903 to 1906 he studied in France at the School for Advanced Studies in the Social Sciences, and also at the Sorbonne. He participated in World War I. In 1918 he was a member of the delegation of Estonia, being the envoy of Estonia to Rome and London. In 1919 he established the Estonian News Agency (Estonian: Eesti Teadete Agentuur). From 1928 to 1931 he was the envoy of Estonia to Riga.

== Awards ==
- 1936: Order of the Cross of the Eagle, II class.
