= Karitsa =

Karitsa may refer to:

== Estonia ==
- Karitsa, Lääne-Viru County, a village in Rakvere Parish, Lääne-Viru County Estonia
- Karitsa, Rapla County, a village in Rapla Parish, Rapla County, Estonia

== Greece ==
- Karitsa, Evrytania, a village in the municipality Karpenisi, Evrytania
- Karitsa, Ioannina, a village in the municipality Zitsa, Ioannina regional unit
- Karitsa, Karditsa, a village in the municipality Lake Plastiras, Karditsa regional unit
- Karitsa, Laconia, a village in the municipality Evrotas, Laconia
- Karitsa, Larissa, a village in the municipality Agia, Larissa regional unit
- Karitsa, Pieria, a village in the municipality Dio-Olympos, Pieria

== Russia ==
- Karitsa, Russia, a rural locality (a settlement) in Gryazovetsky District of Vologda Oblast
