= Jäätma =

Jäätma may refer to several places in Estonia:

- Jäätma, Rakvere Parish, village in Lääne-Viru County, Estonia
- Jäätma, Väike-Maarja Parish, village in Lääne-Viru County, Estonia

== People ==
- Kadri Jäätma (born 1961), Estonian ceramicist, actress and politician
- Lisell Jäätma (born 1999), Estonian archer
- Robin Jäätma (born 2001), Estonian archer
