= Rahkla =

Rahkla may refer to several places in Estonia:

- Rahkla, Vinni Parish, village in Lääne-Viru County, Estonia
- Rahkla, Rakvere Parish, village in Lääne-Viru County, Estonia
