= Taaravainu =

Village in Estonia

Coordinates: 59°19′N 26°20′E

- Village
- Interactive map of Taaravainu
- Country: Estonia
- County: Lääne-Viru County
- Parish: Rakvere Parish

Population (2021)
  - Total: 126 people
- Time zone: UTC+2 (EET)
  - Summer (DST): UTC+3 (EEST)

Taaravainu is a village in Rakvere Parish, Lääne-Viru County, in northeastern Estonia. Its population was 126 at the 2021 census.
