= Elina Pähklimägi =

Estonian actress

- Born: 7 February 1983 (age 43); Ambla, then part of Estonian SSR, Soviet Union
- Other name: Elina Purde (2014–2022)
- Occupation: Actress
- Years active: 2005–present
- Spouse: Andrus Purde (2014–2022)
- Children: 2

Elina Pähklimägi (credited as Elina Purde between 2014–2022; born 7 February 1983) is an Estonian stage, television and film actress whose career began in the mid-2000s.

== Early life and education ==
Elina Pähklimägi was born in the town of Ambla in Järva County and grew up in the nearby village of Ussimäe. She attended the Rakvere Secondary Gymnasium and studied for a year at Tallinn's Estonian Sports Gymnasium before returning to graduate from Rakvere Secondary Gymnasium. Following her 2008 graduation from the Estonian Academy of Music and Theatre in Tallinn she became a freelance actress.

== Career ==
Elina Pähklimägi began her career on various small stage venues throughout Estonia. She garnered her first small television roles on the Eesti Televisioon (ETV) series' Ohtlik lend and Õnne 13 and the Kanal 2 crime series Kelgukoerad in 2006 and 2007 while stile studying at the Estonian Academy of Music and Theatre. Her first starring role in a feature film was in the Liina Paakspuu-directed drama Soovide puu in 2008. This was followed by the role of Liis in the Andres Maimik and Rain Tolk-directed comedy film Kormoranid ehk Nahkpükse ei pesta in 2011. In 2015, she appeared in the Stanislav Govorukhin-directed Russian comedy-drama The End of a Great Era. In 2017, she had a starring role as Elen in the Andrejs Ekis-directed comedy Svingerid, opposite Jan Uuspõld, Ago Anderson, and Elina Reinold, and appeared in the Sulev Keedus-directed historical drama Mehetapja/Süütu/Vari. She has also appeared in a number of short films.

Pähklimägi is possibly best known to Estonian television viewers for her role of Häidi Õigepaulus on the TV3 comedy-crime series Kättemaksukontor; a role she played from 2009 until departing the series in 2013. Other notable television appearances include a starring role as Paula in the Kanal 2 comedy series Takso beginningin 2015, the recurring roles of Tibin in the 2008–2011 Kanal 2 comedy series Eestlane ja Venelane, Angela Salu on the ETV thriller Alpimaja in 2012, and as Irma Marmor on the crime series Siberi võmm in 2017.

== Personal life ==
Elina Pähklimägi married Andrus Purde in 2014 and afterward began using her married surname. In July 2014, she gave birth to a daughter, Mia, and in 2022, the couple divorced. Prior to her relationship with Andrus Purde, she had been in a long-term relationship with actor Kristjan Sarv.
