= Rakvere Lihakombinaat =

Company based in Estonia

Coordinates: 59°22′13.88″N 26°23′40.6″E

Rakvere Lihakombinaat AS
- Company type: Joint-stock company
- Industry: Food processing
- Founded: 1890 in Rakvere
- Headquarters: Roodevälja, Estonia
- Key people: Jari Latvanen (:fi)
- Products: Meat products, meat
- Number of employees: 1200
- Parent: HKScan
- Website: www.rlk.ee

Rakvere Lihakombinaat (Rakvere Meat Processing Plant) is an Estonian meat product manufacturer based in Rakvere. It is the largest meat processor in the Baltic states.

== History ==
The history of Rakvere Meat Processing Plant dates back to 1890, when the first slaughterhouse was opened in Rakvere. In 1905 a new slaughterhouse was built in Rakvere in accordance with the requirements of the time. In 1944 the town's slaughterhouse and Bauman and Schenkel sausage industry were united and Rakvere Meat Processing Plant was established. The enterprise was reconstructed in the 1960s. In 1963 Kohtla-Järve and Narva meat processing plants and joined with the meat processing plant in Rakvere. In 1987 a construction deal was closed with the Finnish enterprise "Suomen Rakennusvienti" and by the year 1990 the biggest, most modern meat processing plant in the Baltic States possessing the technology corresponding to the European level was finished in Roodevälja just northeast of Rakvere. Rakvere Meat Processing Plant has held the position until this day.

Rakvere Meat Processing Plant was privatized in 1995. In 1996 the AS Rakvere Lihakombinaat (PLC Rakvere Meat Processing Plant) obtained the majority holding of the pig-breeding farm AS Ekseko and Ekseko became a subsidiary company of Rakvere Meat Processing Plant. Expansion continued in 1997 when Rigas Miesnieks in Latvia and Klaipedos Maisto Produktai in Lithuania joined Ekseko in the line of subsidiary companies of Rakvere Meat Processing Plant. In 1997 Rakvere Meat Processing Plant was introduced on a stock exchange. In 1998 HK Ruokatalo obtained the majority holding of AS Rakvere Lihakombinaat. In 2006 AS Rakvere Lihakombinaat exited the stock exchange.

== Today ==
In 2008, Rakvere Lihakombinaat had a turnover of 2.1 billion EEK (€134 million) with a profit of 73 million EEK (€4.6 million). During the same time, the company's market share decreased from 32% to 31.7%.

During the Christmas of 2004, 2005, 2007 and 2008, Rakvere Lihakombinaat sent packages of blood pudding to Estonian soldiers in Afghanistan. Since 2004, the company has also given Christmas food packages to families in Estonia with seven or more children. In 2008, 236 families received the Christmas package. In August 2009, Rakvere Lihakombinaat's subsidiary Ekseko invested 22 million EEK (€1.4 million) into a self-sustaining (the cooling system is powered by manure) piglet farm, which houses over 7700 piglets.

It is a member of the Association of Estonian Food Industry

== Products ==
- Meat products: luncheon meats, wieners, frankfurters, minced meat products, smoked meats, smoked sausages, pates, jellied products, deep-frozen products, blood products (sausages and pudding), grill sausages, natural grill sausages
- Meat: kebab, meats in marinade, ribs in marinade, refrigerated minced meat, frozen minced meat, refrigerated cuts of meat, breaded meats

== Subsidiaries ==
- AS Ekseko is the biggest pig-breeding farm in the Baltic and Nordic countries with about 100 000 pigs being bred at any moment. When 65% of Estonian pigs are realized in Rakvere, then 50% of these pigs have been bred in Ekseko. In cooperation with Estonian pig-breeders the so-called piglet-project has also started successfully. A deed is closed with a pig-breeder and based on the deed Ekseko gives the breeders the piglets. After 4 months the contractual partner delivers the fully-grown fattening pigs to Rakvere Meat Processing Plant. The piglet project provides 45% of pigs that are delivered to Rakvere.
- AS Rigas Miesnieks is a subsidiary enterprise of Rakvere Meat Processing Plant that is situated in Latvia. There is a production unit and sales and marketing center in Rigas Miesnieks.
- Klaipedos Maisto Produktai is situated in Lithuania and the area of activity there is concerned with sales and marketing of the products.
