= Tõrremäe =

Village in Estonia

Coordinates: 59°22′N 26°19′E

- Village
- Interactive map of Tõrremäe
- Country: Estonia
- County: Lääne-Viru County
- Parish: Rakvere Parish
- Time zone: UTC+2 (EET)
  - Summer (DST): UTC+3 (EEST)

Tõrremäe is a village in Rakvere Parish, Lääne-Viru County, in northeastern Estonia.
