= Näpi =

Township in Rakvere Rural Municipality, Lääne-Viru County, Estonia

Coordinates: 59.3636°N 26.4161°E

- Village
- Interactive map of Näpi
- Country: Estonia
- County: Lääne-Viru County
- Parish: Rakvere Parish

Population (2019)
  - Total: 315
- Time zone: UTC+2 (EET)
  - Summer (DST): UTC+3 (EEST)

Näpi is an alevik (borough) in Rakvere Parish, Lääne-Viru County, Northern Estonia. Prior to the 2017 administrative reform of local governments, Näpi was part of Sõmeru Parish.
