= Lepna =

Borough in Estonia

- Small borough
- Location in Estonia
- Coordinates: 59°19′49″N 26°17′22″E
- Country: Estonia
- County: Lääne-Viru County
- Municipality: Rakvere Parish

Population (2011 Census)
  - Total: 415

Lepna is a small borough (Estonian: alevik) in Rakvere Parish, Lääne-Viru County, in northeastern Estonia. As of the 2011 census, the settlement's population was 415.
