= Arkna =

Village in Estonia

Coordinates: 59°23′N 26°22′E

- Village
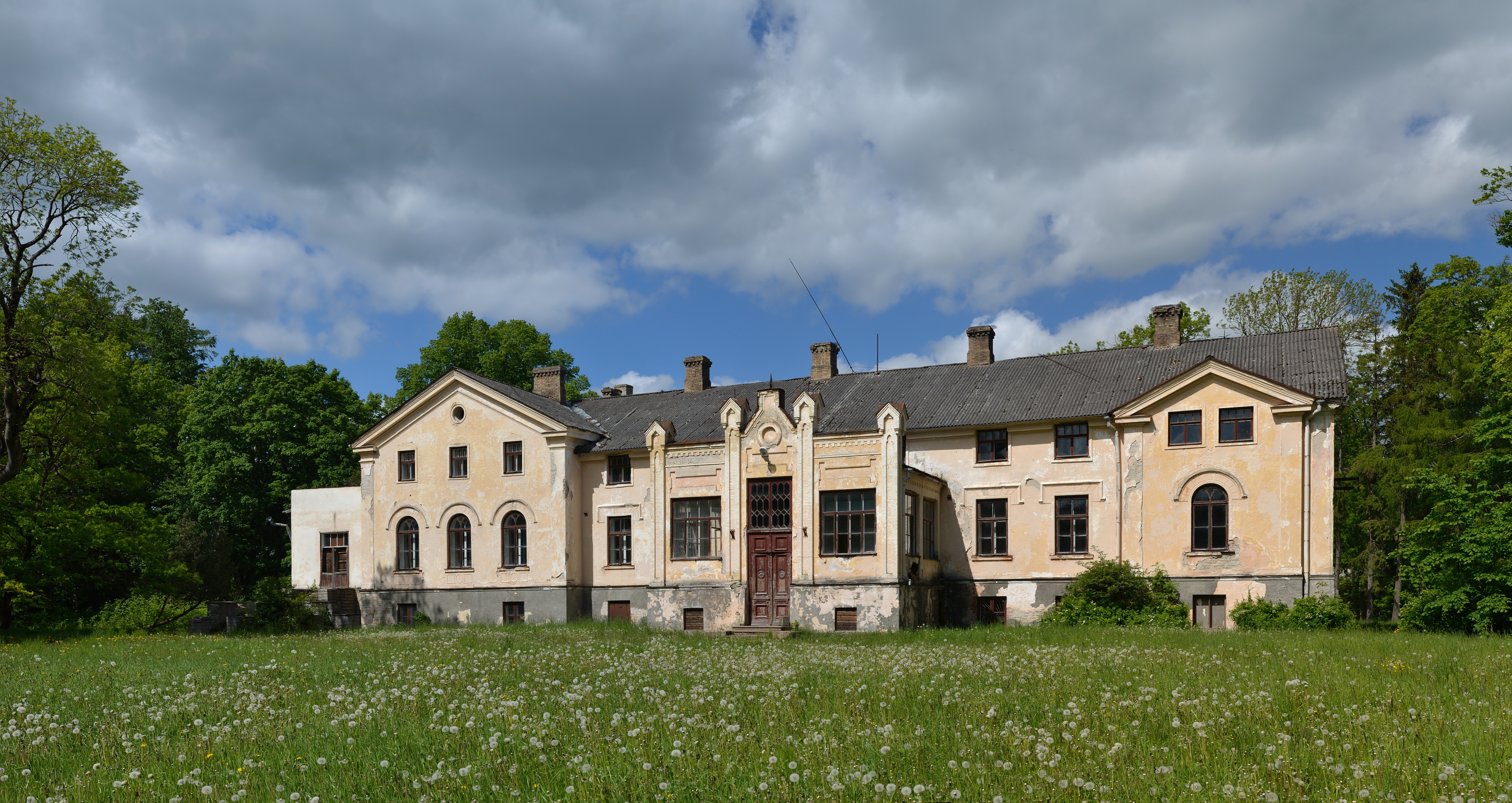
- Arkna Manor
- Interactive map of Arkna
- Country: Estonia
- County: Lääne-Viru County
- Parish: Rakvere Parish
- Time zone: UTC+2 (EET)
  - Summer (DST): UTC+3 (EEST)

Arkna is a village in Rakvere Parish, Lääne-Viru County, in northeastern Estonia.

== Arkna Manor ==
Arkna (German: Arknal) estate traces its history to 1527. The main building seen today however dates from 1879, and is built in a Historicist style. Apart from the main building, in which some original interiors also survive, several annexes have also been preserved. These are located behind the manor and likewise date from the 19th century. The former manor park, designed around the nearby Selja River, is still surrounded by its wall.
