= Rägavere, Rakvere Parish =

Village in Estonia

Coordinates: 59°19′N 26°29′E

Rägavere
- Village
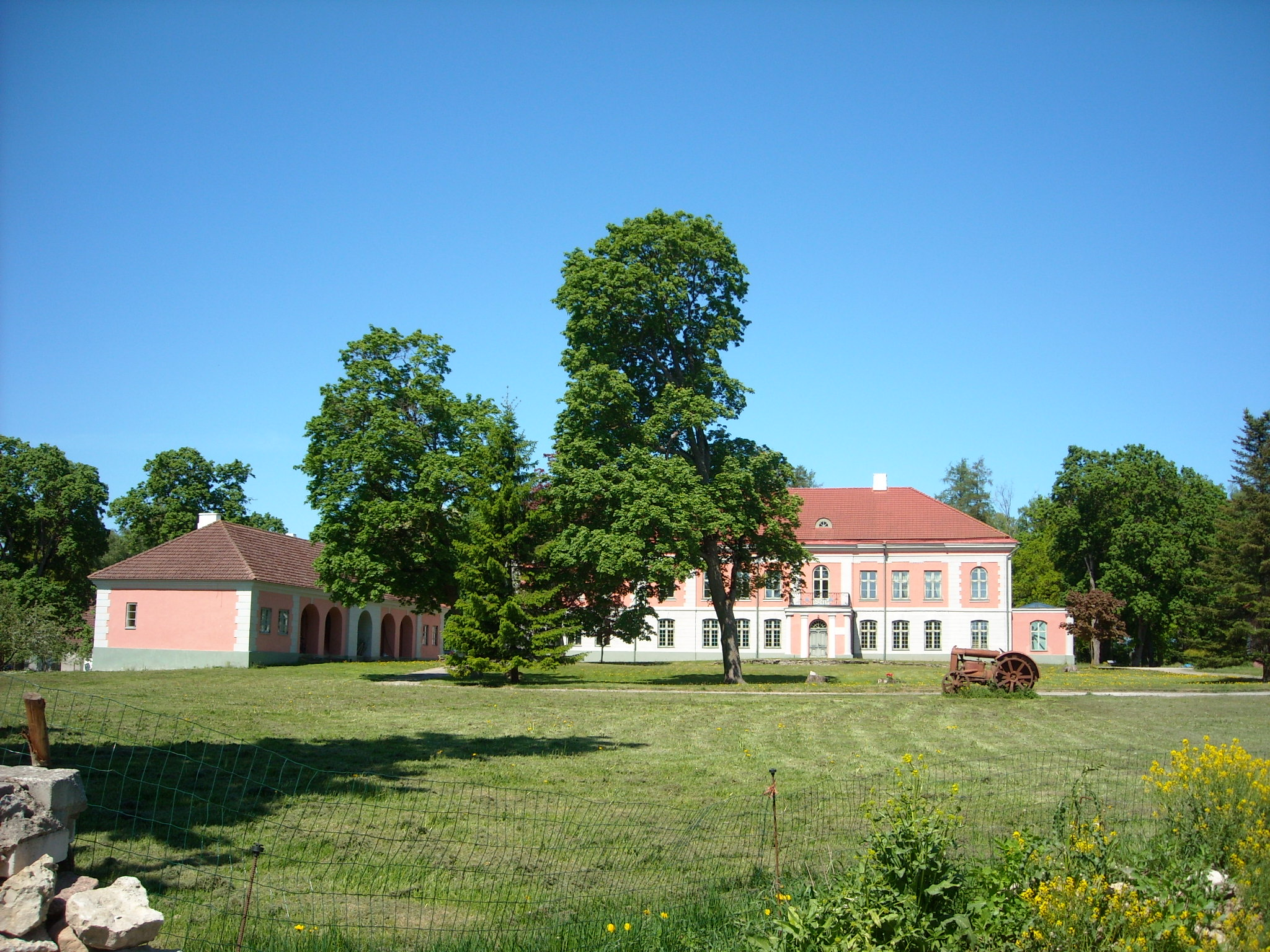
- Rägavere Manor
- Interactive map of Rägavere
- Country: Estonia
- County: Lääne-Viru County
- Parish: Rakvere Parish
- Time zone: UTC+2 (EET)
  - Summer (DST): UTC+3 (EEST)

Rägavere is a village in Rakvere Parish, Lääne-Viru County, in northeastern Estonia.

== Rägavere Manor ==
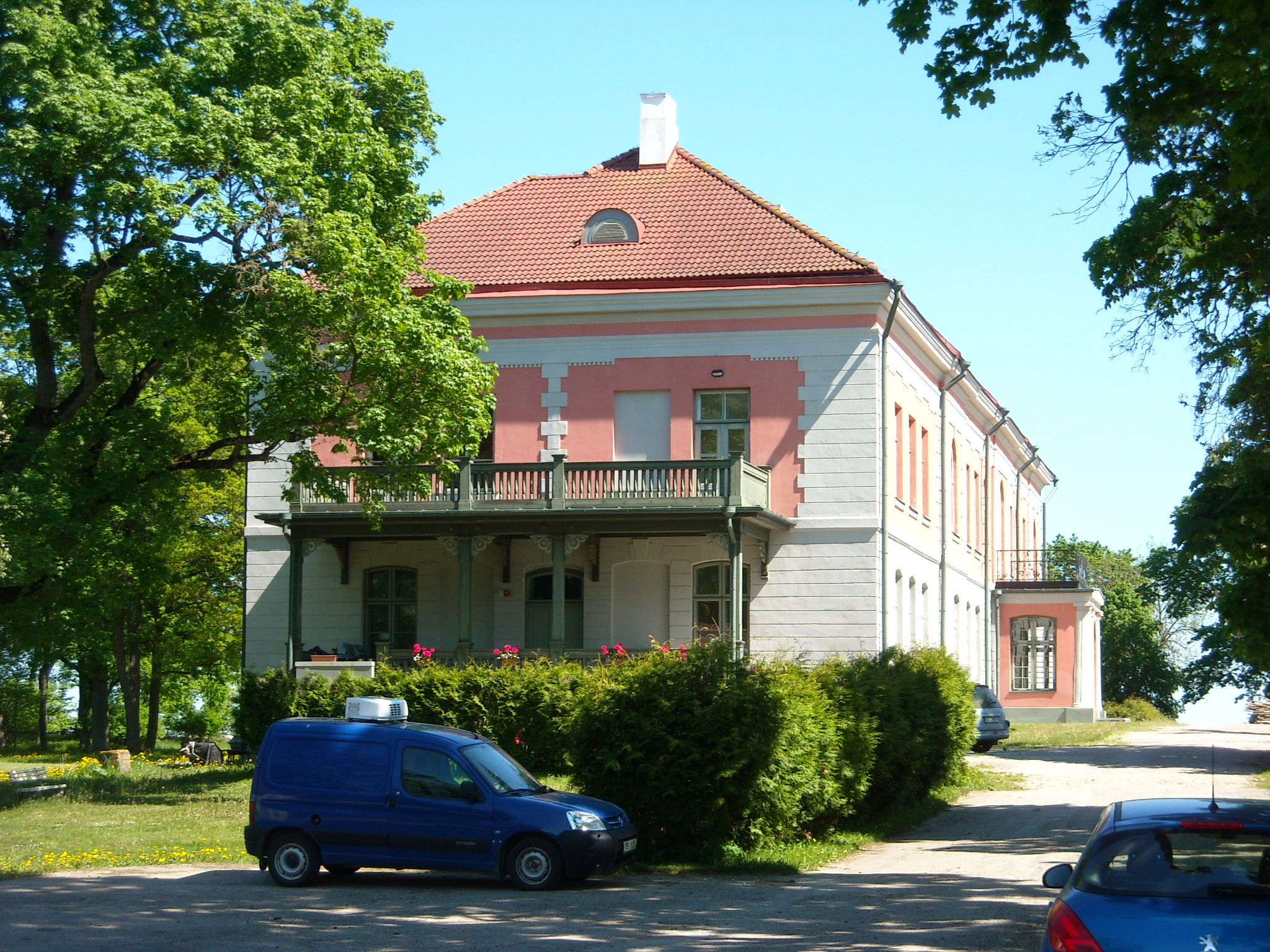
View of the manor from the side

Rägavere (German: Raggafer) estate has a history that goes back to 1540, when Mõdriku estate was split in two by the Baltic German brothers Wolmar and Dietrich Brackel. Rägavere estate became the property of Dietrich Brackel. From then until the land reforms of 1919, when most aristocratic property was seized by the newly independent state of Estonia, the estate belonged to a number of Baltic aristocratic families, including the families Metztaken, Taube, Paykull, Schulmann, Stackelberg, von Knorring, Kaulbars, von Herzfeld, von Dehn and Pilar von Pilchau. From 1922 until 1977 it housed a school. In the 1970s the chairman of the local kolkhoz, Erich Erilt, initiated restoration works, the first such undertaking in then-occupied Estonia. His efforts sparked a renewed interest in manor house architecture and eventually led to the restoration of many more manors in Estonia, such as Palmse, Sagadi, Pirgu and others.

The main building seen today dates from the end of the 18th century; an earlier building was devastated during the Great Northern War. A wing was added after a fire in 1889. The building contains fine Rococo interiors, evidently designed by Johann Schultz (who also designed parts of Toompea Castle in Tallinn) and are especially noteworthy for their fine stucco decorations, in the style of Michał Ceptowski.
