= Endel Ruberg =

Estonian-Canadian artist

- Endel Ruberg in 1981 helping a young child create artwork.
- Born: 21 May 1917; Sõmeru Parish, Lääne-Viru County, Estonia
- Died: 29 December 1989 (aged 72); Stockholm, Sweden
- Occupations: Artist, Educator

Endel Ruberg (21 May 1917 – 29 December 1989) was an Estonian-Canadian artist, naturalist, and humanitarian. He is best known for his leather and watercolour artwork as well as his volunteer work with children.

== Biography ==
Endel Ruberg in 1989 wearing his medals while discussing his artwork. Inset shows detailed view of medals.

Endel Ruberg was born in Virumaa, Estonia. After the Soviet invasion and occupation of Estonia, Ruberg became a member of the Forest Brothers and fought against the Soviets. In 1941, he fled to Finland and participated in the Continuation War as part of the soomepoisid; a unit in the Finnish army during World War II made up mostly of Estonian volunteers, who preferred to fight against the Soviet Union in the ranks of the Finnish army instead of the armed forces of Germany. He was severely wounded in action in 1942. In August 1944, he returned to Estonia to fight against the advancing Red Army. In September 1944, fled by boat across the sea to Sweden. In 1951 he emigrated from Sweden to Canada. He died in 1989 in Stockholm, Sweden while on holiday.

Endel Ruberg's artwork won over 50 awards and prizes, among them the Queen Elizabeth II Coronation Jubilee Medal (1978) for his contribution to Canadian art. Alar Kivilo's documentary film Ruberg (1977) profiles the artist's life and work.

== Leather art ==
=== Leather relief technique ===
Ruberg created leather artwork in low relief using traditional leather tooling methods and in high relief using a technique he developed himself. The high relief technique relies on applying a homemade paste to the reverse side of a leather piece for support, and then wrinkling, twisting, squeezing the front side to form three-dimensional shapes.

=== Direct contact with nature ===
Ruberg worked mostly in the forest of the Laurentian Mountains of Quebec, in direct contact with nature. He valued the freedom and simplicity of nature, and felt that working outdoors was more inspiring and truthful to his art. The film critic Natalie Edwards, in reviewing the documentary Ruberg, describes Ruberg's austere work environment as complementing his simple philosophy of life:

… the bird sounds, forest sights, rustic life, and devotion to nature create an atmosphere at one with the artist … we listen with openness to the simple unsophisticated beliefs of Ruberg as he speaks of the greater artistic value resulting from the simpler and more primitive handling of the work.

=== Themes ===
Võitlus idatuulega, leather in high relief, 55.0cm x 60.0cm. Collection of Kembi Talu.

Resilience in the face of adversity is a unifying theme in Ruberg's artwork. The objects of nature, such as trees and rocks, which must endure the harsh forces of weather are personified by Ruberg. He believed that "Every rock has its own face, its own attraction. Rocks are symbols of character. God has filled them with his teachings." The narrator in the documentary Ruberg describes Ruberg's personification of trees:

Ruberg’s often reoccurring motif of a strong, windswept tree symbolizes the spiritual strength needed to confront the negative forces in life. The powerful roots planted firmly in the rocky soil remind us that our accomplishments relate to our cultural past, regardless of its modesty.

In addition to landscapes, Ruberg created sentimental works that captured the mood felt by many in the Estonian exile community longing for their native land. In Omal Maal (1978) Ruberg depicts the skyline of Tallinn, the capital city of Estonia. The reverse side of Omal Maal (1978) shows Ruberg's inscription, taken from the Estonian folk epic Kalevipoeg, the last few verses of canto XVI, expressing the joy one feels when returning home after a long journey.

From the reverse side of Omal Maal (1978).

== Watercolours ==
=== Akvarelli külmutustehnika ===
In watercolours, Endel Ruberg discovered a technique to produce naturally occurring frost patterns in his paintings—the akvarelli külmutustehnika (an Estonian expression meaning watercolour freeze technique). The akvarelli külmutustehnika relies on painting outdoors during winter, allowing the cold air to condense and crystallize the watercolour paints as they dry. In those cold working conditions Ruberg painted with urgency, his brushwork displaying a fluid and spontaneous style. The akvarelli külmutustehnika introduces unpredictable geometric patterns, which appear as dendrite formations, needle-like structures, and arrow-like patterns depending on the wind conditions. Ruberg intentionally wanted the natural environment to contribute to his artwork, to enhance the atmospheric quality of the work and to establish a collaboration between artist and nature.

=== Themes ===
The coniferous trees of the boreal forest of Canada are recurring motifs in Ruberg's watercolour paintings. They are represented as symbols of strength. These trees are well adapted to survive prolonged northern winters (their branches shed snow easily and their needle leaves help retain water and warmth). Ruberg felt special attachment to the conifers, saying "I have always felt a strong pull towards the north country. I grew up by a large forest of fir trees. The fir tree is a part of home to me." A typical compositional arrangement in a Ruberg watercolour painting is a row of trees standing in front of a sunlit sky. In a painting where the sun explicitly appears, its effect is to fill the sky with a warm palette of colour. Ruberg said "I feel my best work is done in the fading light at the end of the day. The late afternoon sun blesses my work."

== Youth education ==
Endel Ruberg in 1989 receiving an award at Jõekääru summer camp.

=== Art instruction ===
Endel Ruberg was very involved with youth. He worked with young people in camps and in scouting, giving them opportunities to paint and work in leather under his guidance. He also volunteered for three years to help blind and disabled children and guide teachers at the Mackay Centre School in Montreal. On art education, Ruberg said

I am there for guidance and assistance. Perhaps most important of all is encouragement. The young get discouraged easily. The finished [art] work is good incentive. Through early achievement comes patience and eventually maturity.

=== Cultural awareness ===
Endel Ruberg encouraged a greater sensitivity to nature and to our ancestral connections with the earth. He re-enacted old rituals associated with the pre-Christian Estonian deity Taara. He also appeared at events dressed in costume as Kalevipoeg, a legendary folk hero of Estonia.

Endel Ruberg fervently supported an end to Soviet occupation in Estonia. During the 1985 Canadian Ski Marathon he distributed informational material advocating 'Freedom for Estonia!' At times his activism led to mild controversies, such as when his Boy Scout troop was barred from exhibiting at Expo 67 due to Ruberg's distribution of anti-Soviet "propaganda". Ruberg died before the Dissolution of the Soviet Union and the restoration of independence to Estonia.
