= Varudi-Vanaküla =

Village in Estonia

- Village
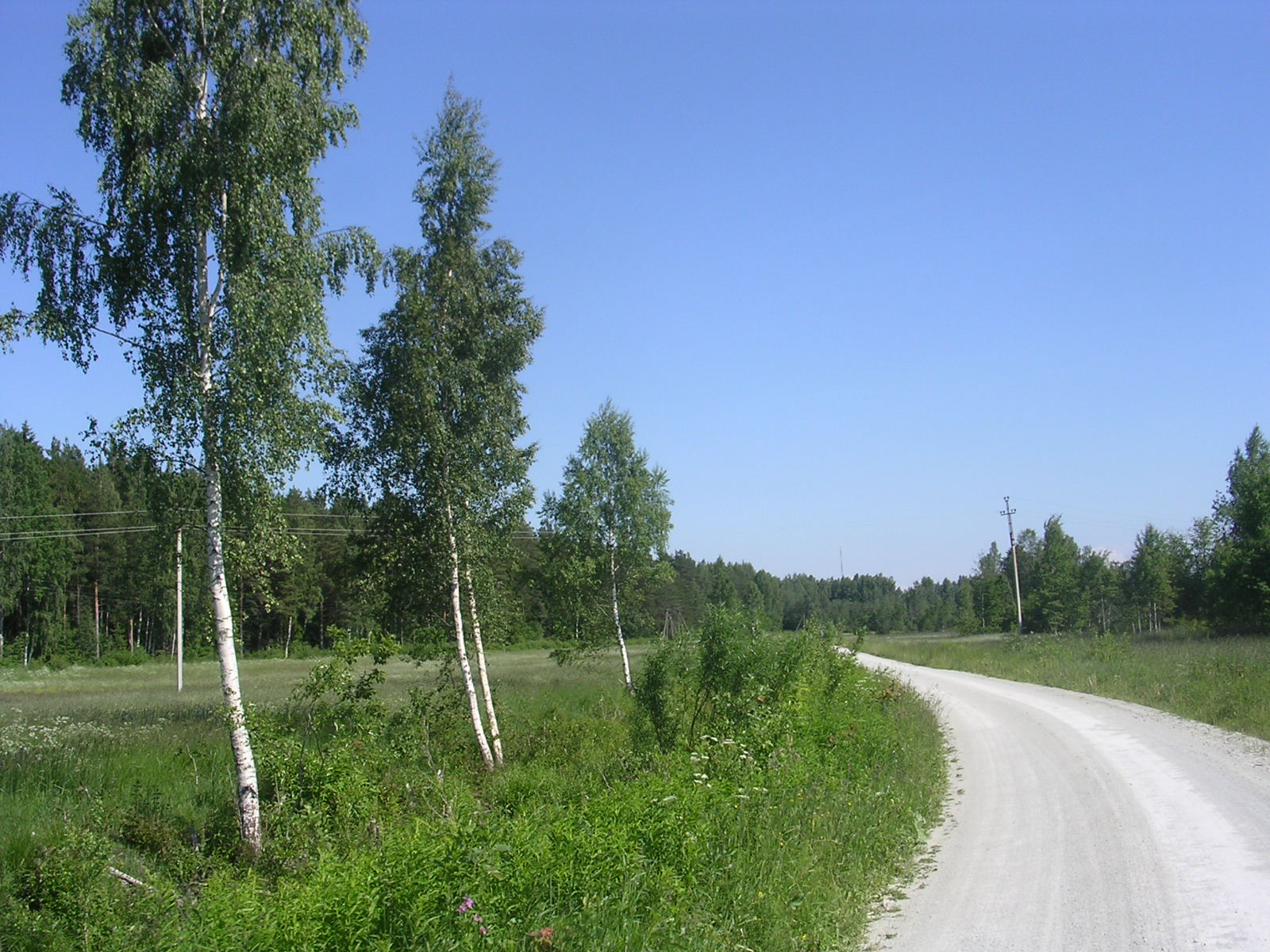
- Varudi-Liivanõmme

- Location in Estonia
- Coordinates: 59°24′17″N 26°35′34″E
- Country: Estonia
- County: Lääne-Viru County
- Municipality: Rakvere Parish

Population (01.01.2010)
  - Total: 45

Varudi-Vanaküla is a village in Rakvere Parish, Lääne-Viru County, in northeastern Estonia. It has a population of 45 (as of 1 January 2010).

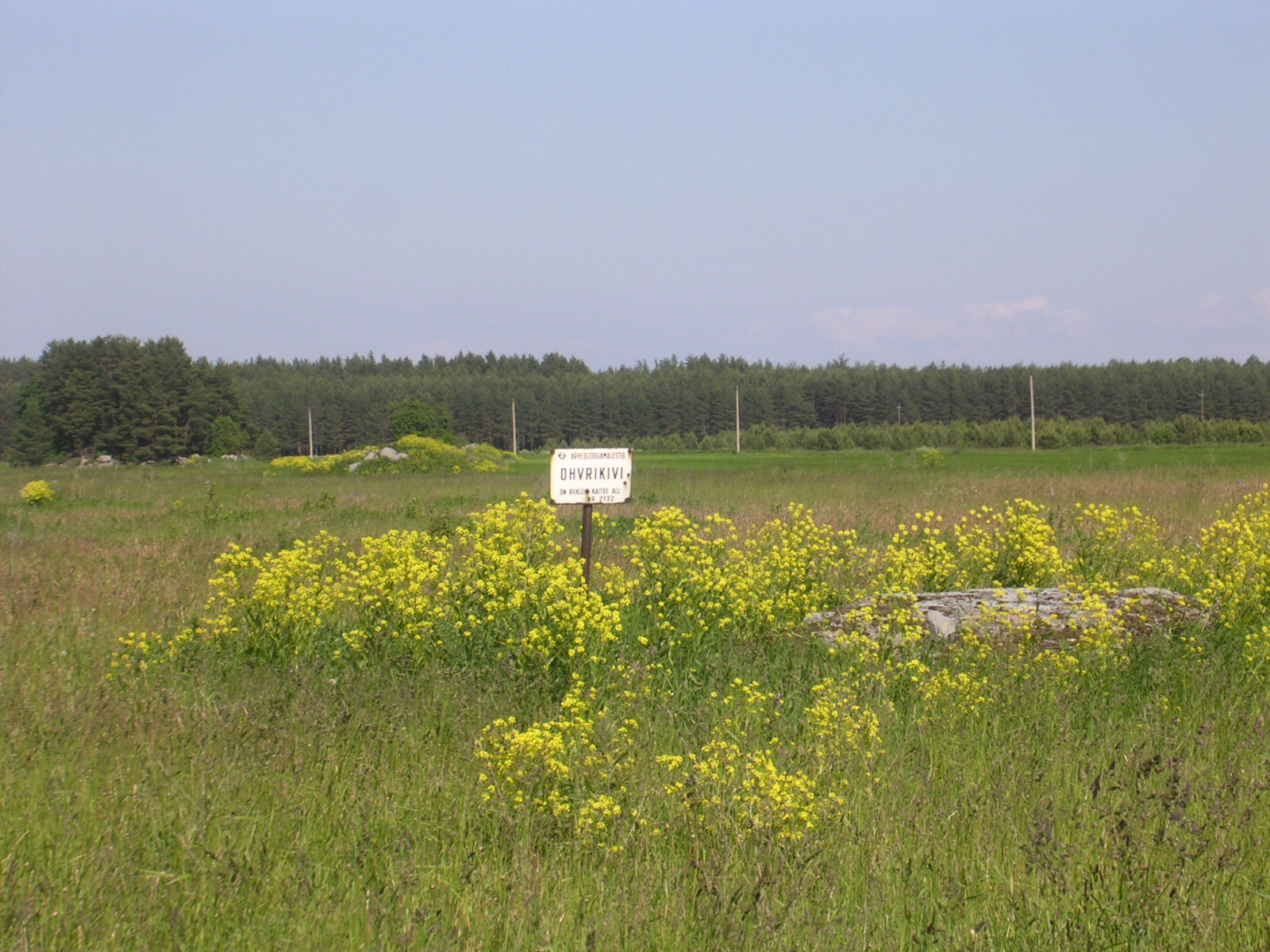
Sacrificial stone in Varudi-Vanaküla
