= Kohala, Estonia =

Village in Estonia

Coordinates: 59°24′51″N 26°31′37″E

- Village
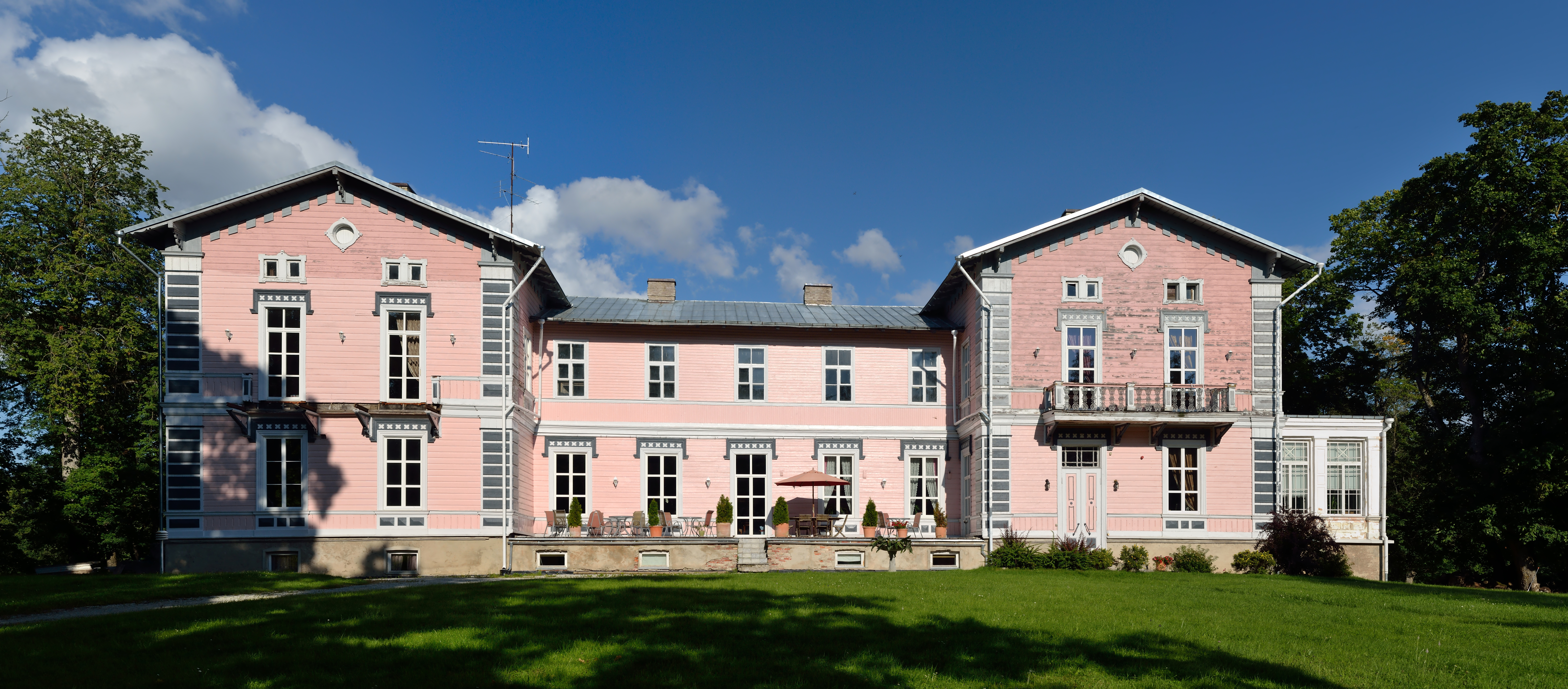
- Kohala Manor
- Interactive map of Kohala, Estonia
- Country: Estonia
- County: Lääne-Viru
- Parish: Sõmeru
- Time zone: UTC+2 (EET)
  - Summer (DST): UTC+3 (EEST)

Kohala is a village in Rakvere Parish, Lääne-Viru County, in northeastern Estonia.
