= Roodevälja =

Village in Estonia

- Village
- Location in Estonia
- Coordinates: 59°22′21″N 26°23′08″E
- Country: Estonia
- County: Lääne-Viru County
- Municipality: Rakvere Parish

Population (01.01.2010)
  - Total: 153

Roodevälja is a village in Rakvere Parish, Lääne-Viru County, in northeastern Estonia. It is located just northeast of the town of Rakvere. Roodevälja has a population of 153 (as of 1 January 2010).

Rakvere Meat Processing Plant (Rakvere Lihakombinaat), the biggest meat products manufacturer in the Baltic states, is located in Roodevälja.
