= Sõmeru =

Borough in Estonia

- Small borough
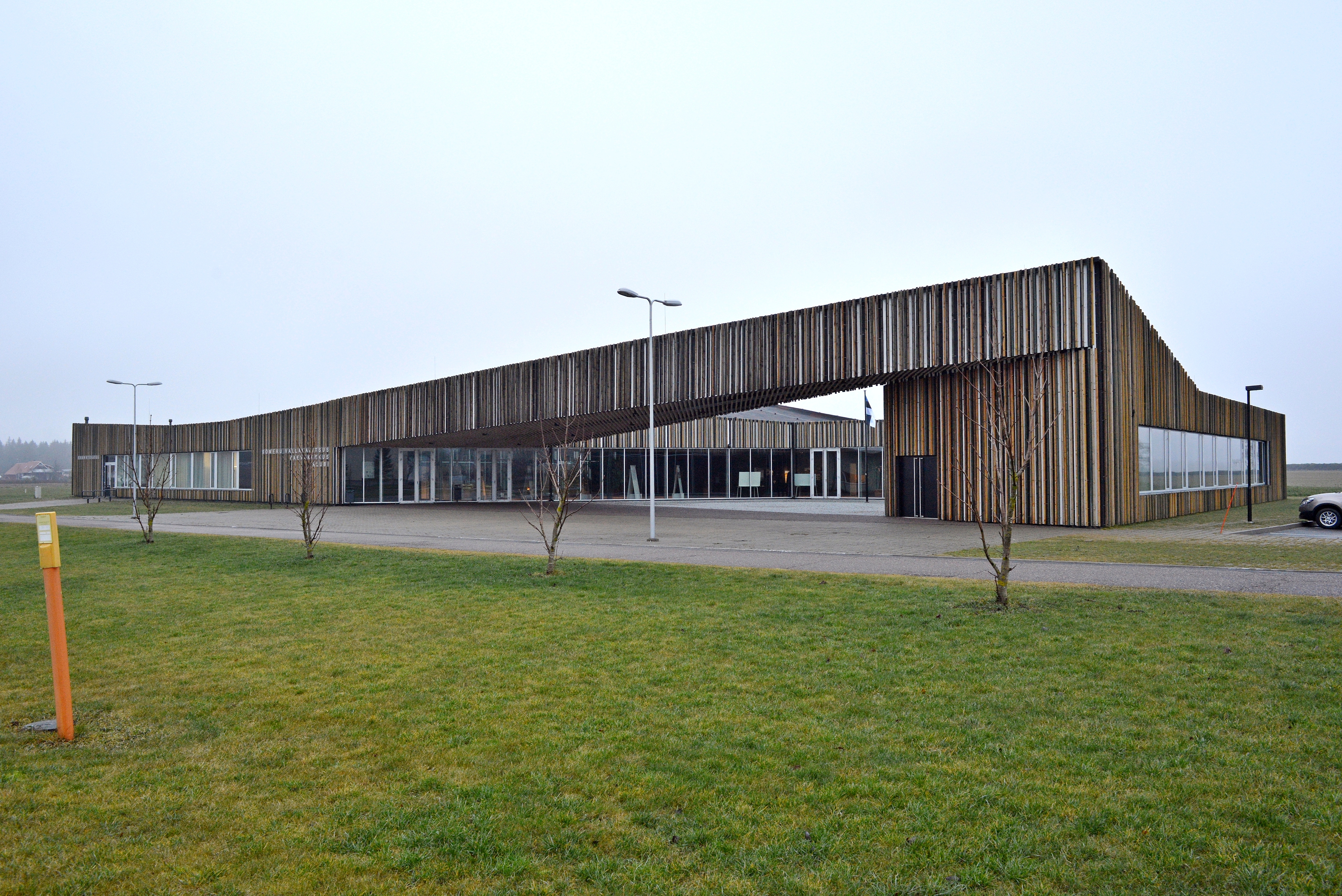
- Sõmeru municipal hall

- Location in Estonia
- Coordinates: 59°21′29″N 26°26′09″E
- Country: Estonia
- County: Lääne-Viru County
- Municipality: Rakvere Parish

Population (01.01.2010)
  - Total: 1,289

Sõmeru (German: Neu-Sommerhusen) is a small borough (Estonian: alevik) in Lääne-Viru County, in northeastern Estonia. It is located about 4 km east of the town of Rakvere. Sõmeru is the administrative centre of Rakvere Parish. Sõmeru has a population of 1,289 (as of 1 January 2010).
