= Andja =

Village in Estonia

Coordinates: 59°27′N 26°27′E

- Village
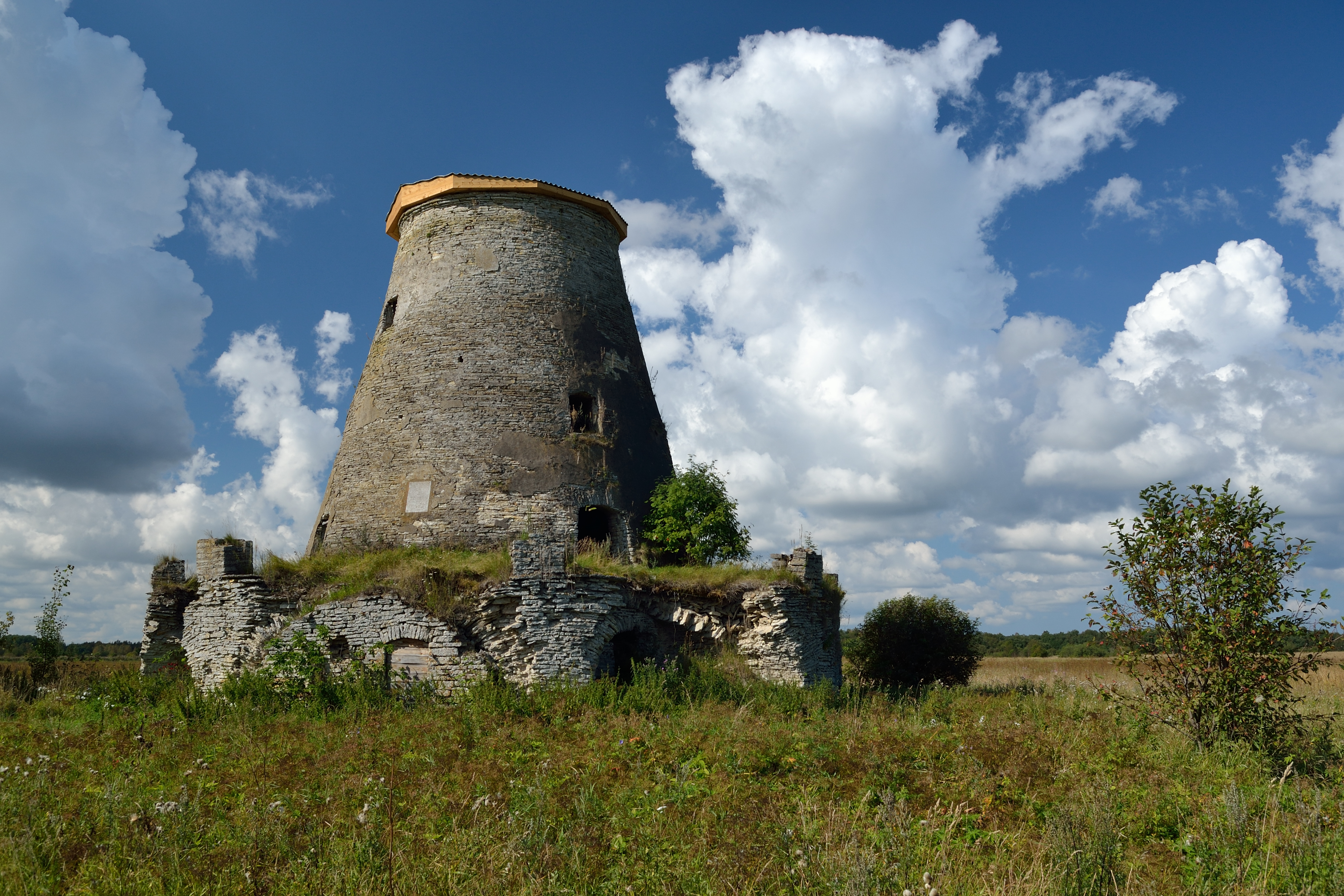
- Andja manor windmill ruins
- Interactive map of Andja
- Country: Estonia
- County: Lääne-Viru County
- Parish: Rakvere Parish
- Time zone: UTC+2 (EET)
  - Summer (DST): UTC+3 (EEST)

Andja (German: Addinal) is a village in Rakvere Parish, Lääne-Viru County, in northeastern Estonia.
