= Kloodi =

Village in Estonia

Coordinates: 59°23′N 26°17′E

- Village
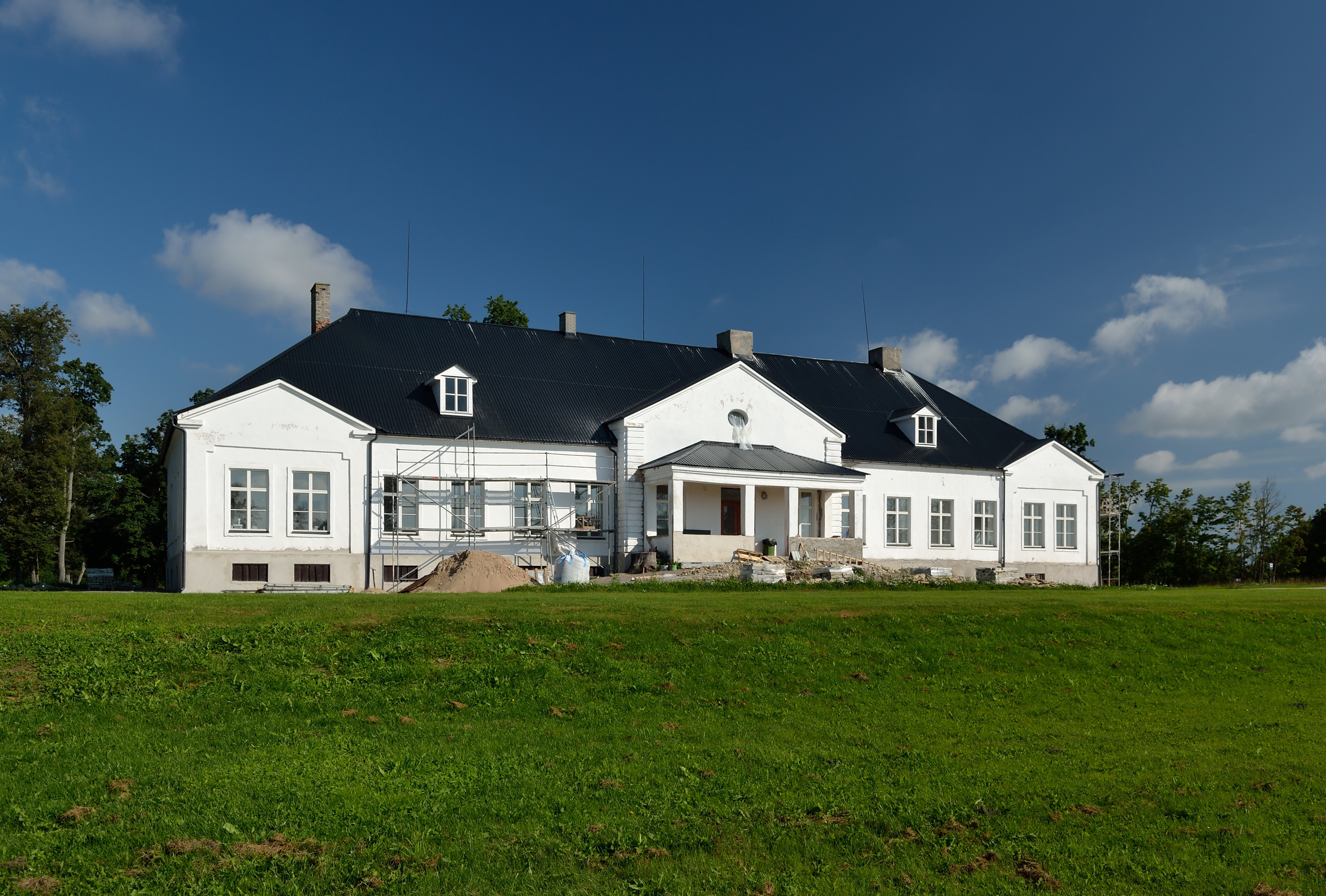
- Kloodi manor main building
- Interactive map of Kloodi
- Country: Estonia
- County: Lääne-Viru County
- Parish: Rakvere Parish
- Time zone: UTC+2 (EET)
  - Summer (DST): UTC+3 (EEST)

Kloodi is a village in Rakvere Parish, Lääne-Viru County, in northeastern Estonia.

== Gallery ==
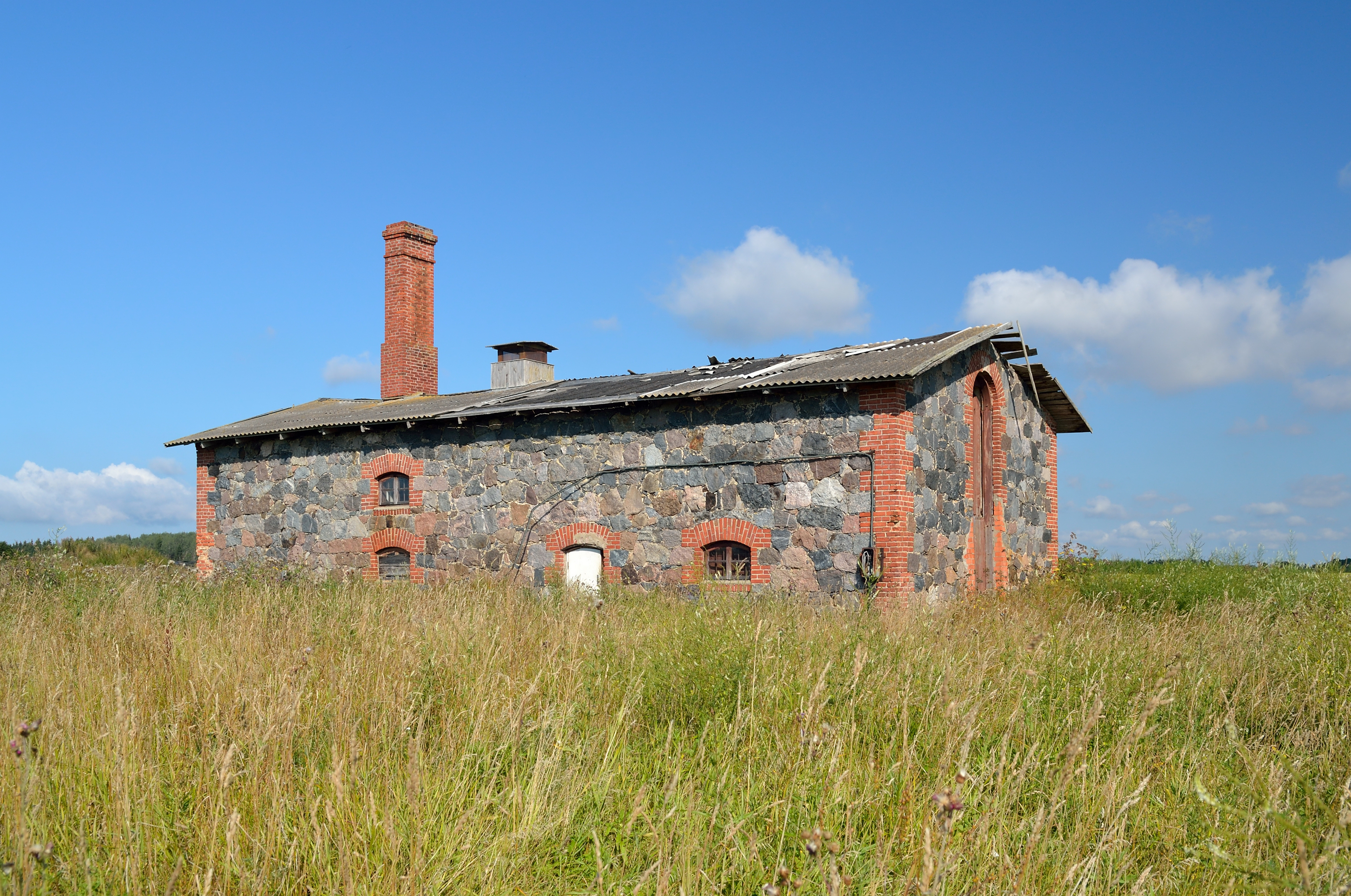
Kloodi manor ancillary building

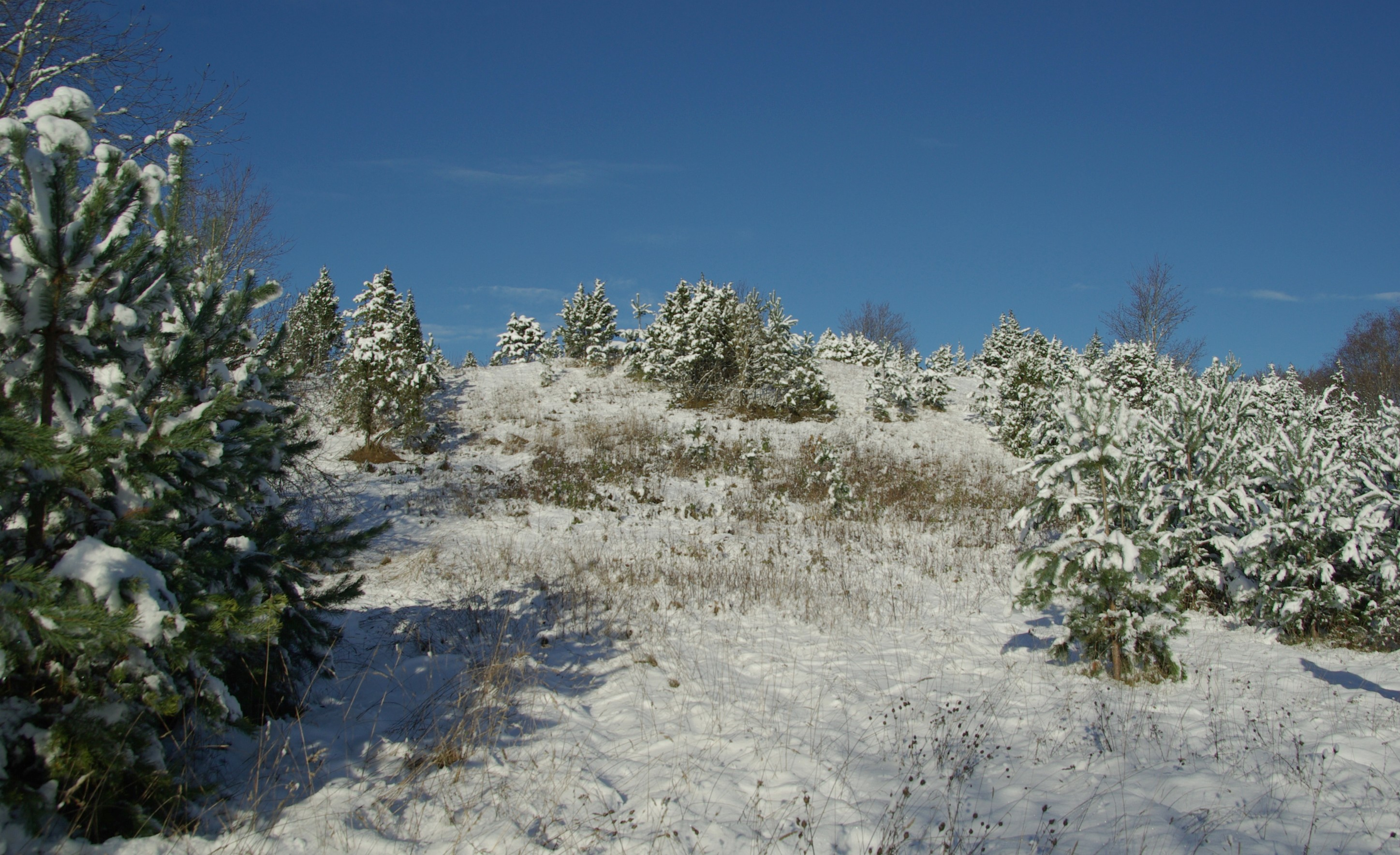
Kloodi hill fort
