= Katela =

Village in Estonia

Coordinates: 59°27′N 26°25′E

- Village
- Interactive map of Katela
- Country: Estonia
- County: Lääne-Viru County
- Parish: Rakvere Parish
- Time zone: UTC+2 (EET)
  - Summer (DST): UTC+3 (EEST)

Katela is a village in Rakvere Parish, Lääne-Viru County, in northeastern Estonia. The town is about 58 mi (or 94 km) east of Tallinn. It is the birthplace of Estonian writer Jüri Parijõgi.
