= Sämi =

Village in Estonia

- Village
- Location in Estonia
- Coordinates: 59°22′47″N 26°35′58″E
- Country: Estonia
- County: Lääne-Viru County
- Municipality: Rakvere Parish

Population (01.01.2010)
  - Total: 59

Sämi is a village in Rakvere Parish, Lääne-Viru County, in northeastern Estonia. It is located on the Tallinn–Narva highway (E20), about 14 km (9 mi) east of the town of Rakvere. Sämi has a population of 59 (as of 1 January 2010).
