= Jäätma, Rakvere Parish =

Village in Estonia

Coordinates: 59°26′01″N 26°30′08″E

Jäätma
- Village
- Interactive map of Jäätma
- Country: Estonia
- County: Lääne-Viru County
- Parish: Rakvere Parish
- Time zone: UTC+2 (EET)
  - Summer (DST): UTC+3 (EEST)

Jäätma is a village in Rakvere Parish, Lääne-Viru County, in northeastern Estonia.
