= Kunda (river) =

River in Estonia

Kunda river
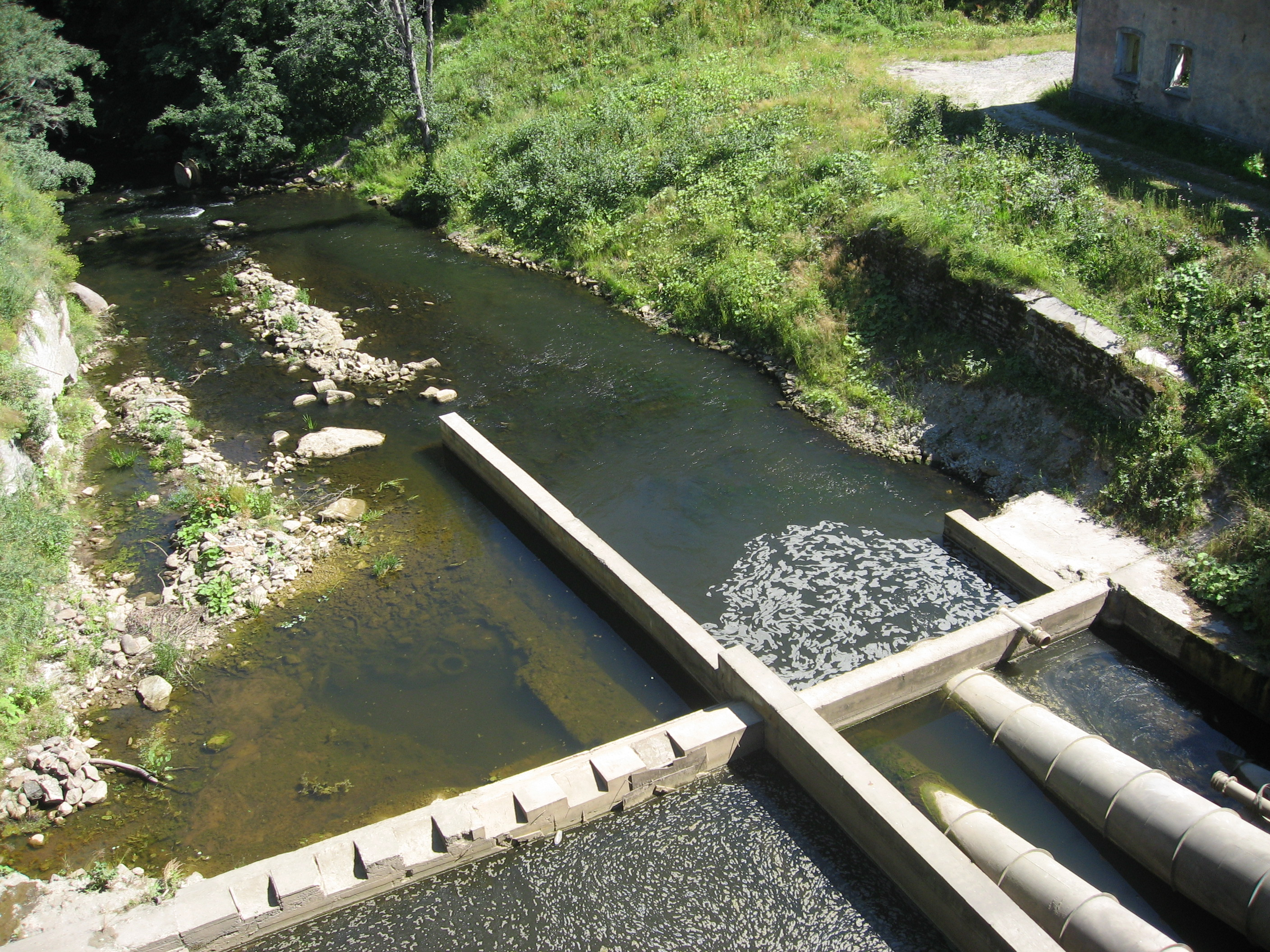
- The Kunda River near Roela (July 2007)

Location
- Country: Estonia

Physical characteristics
- Mouth: Gulf of Finland
  - location: Kunda
  - coordinates: 59°31′13″N 26°32′00″E
- Length: 65.8 km
- Basin size: 535.9 km²

The Kunda is a river in Estonia in Lääne-Viru County. The river is 65.8 km long, and its basin size is 535.9 km^{2}. It discharges into the Gulf of Finland. The river has been heavily modified by human activity.

Trout and grayling live in the river.

== See also ==
- List of rivers of Estonia
