= Rahkla, Rakvere Parish =

Village in Estonia

Rahkla
- Village
- Interactive map of Rahkla
- Country: Estonia
- County: Lääne-Viru County
- Parish: Rakvere Parish

Population (2019-01-01)
  - Total: 42
- Time zone: UTC+2 (EET)
  - Summer (DST): UTC+3 (EEST)

Rahkla is a village in Rakvere Parish, Lääne-Viru County, in northeastern Estonia.

Before the administrative reform of Estonian local governments in 2017, the village belonged to Sõmeru rural municipality .

Its EHAK (Eesti haldus- ja asustusjaotuse klassifikaator) code is 6726.
