= Tamsalu Parish =

Former municipality of Estonia

Tamsalu Parish Tamsalu vald
- Former municipality of Estonia
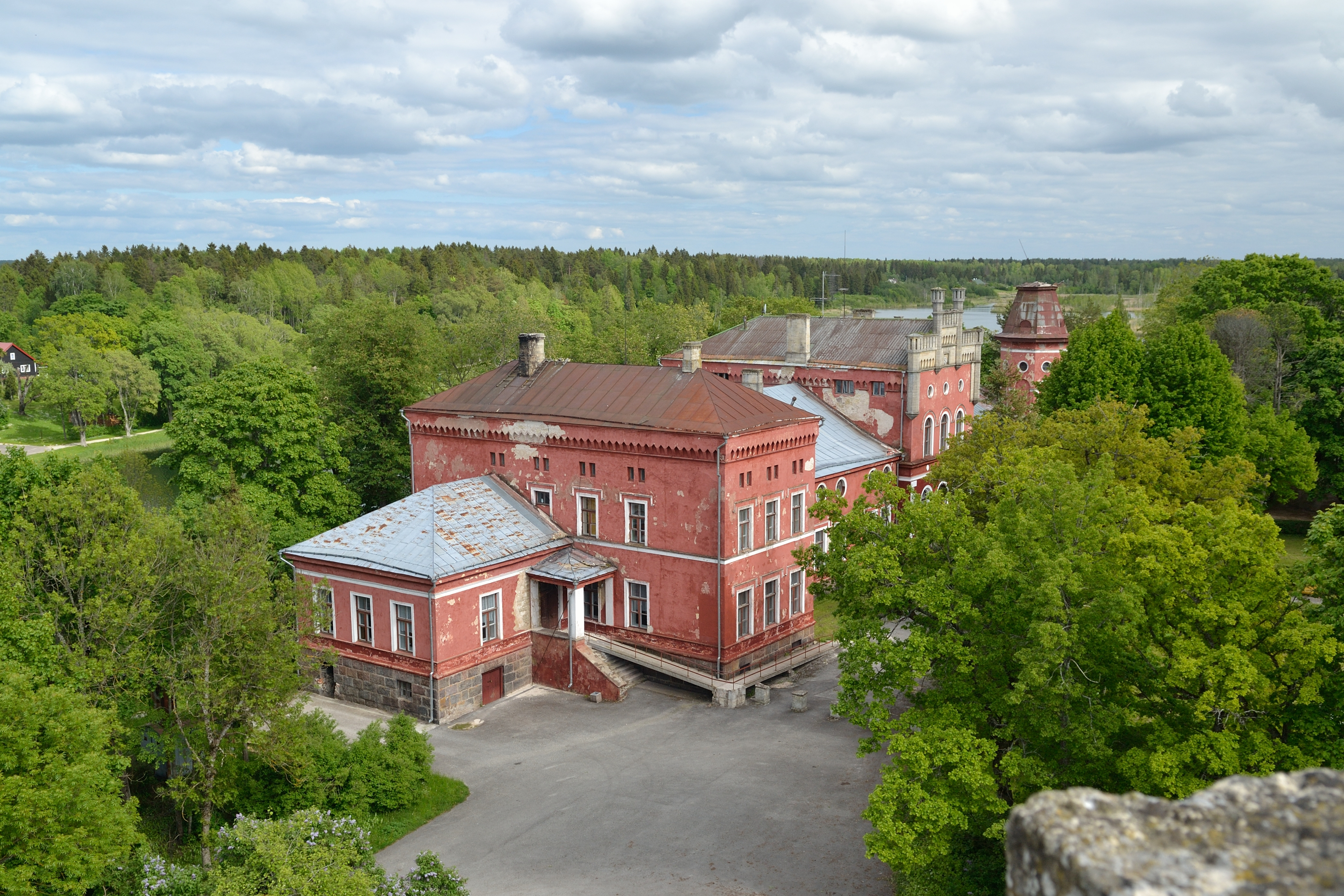
- Porkuni manor

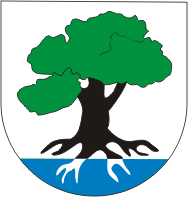
- Flag Coat of arms

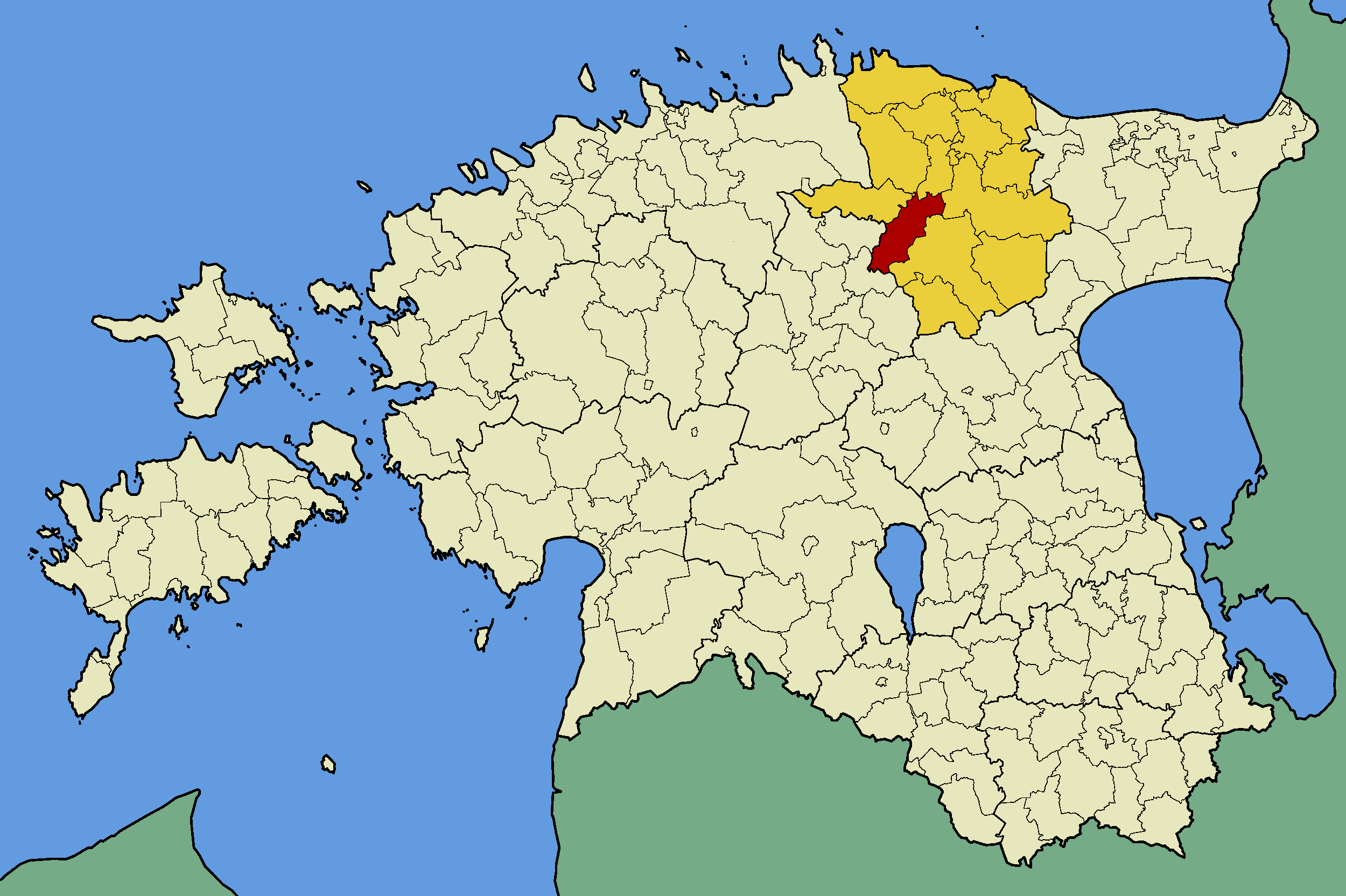
- Tamsalu Parish within Lääne-Viru County.
- Country: Estonia
- County: Lääne-Viru County
- Administrative centre: Tamsalu

Area
  - Total: 214.61 km^{2} (82.86 sq mi)

Population (01.01.2017)
  - Total: 3,726
  - Density: 17.36/km^{2} (44.97/sq mi)
- Website: www.tamsalu.ee

Tamsalu Parish (Estonian: Tamsalu vald) was a rural municipality of Estonia, in Lääne-Viru County. It had a population of 3,726 (as of 2017) and an area of 214.61 km^{2}.

== Settlements ==
Town

Tamsalu

Small borough

Sääse

Villages

Aavere, Alupere, Araski, Assamalla, Järsi, Järvajõe, Kadapiku, Kaeva, Kerguta, Koiduküla, Koplitaguse, Kuie, Kullenga, Kursi, Lemmküla, Loksa, Metskaevu, Naistevälja, Piisupi, Porkuni, Põdrangu, Sauvälja, Savalduma, Türje, Uudeküla, Vadiküla, Vajangu, Vistla, Võhmetu, Võhmuta.

== See also ==
- Lake Porkuni
- Battle of Porkuni
