= List of windmills in Estonia =

This is a list of windmills in Estonia.

Location	Name and coordinates	Type	Built	Notes	Photograph
Aaspere; Haljala Parish; Lääne-Viru County	Aaspere manor windmill		19th century		
Aavere; Tamsalu Parish; Lääne-Viru County	Aavere manor windmill		19th century		
Adavere; Põltsamaa Parish; Jõgeva County			18th century		
Andja; Rakvere Parish; Lääne-Viru County	Andja manor windmill		1804		
Angla; Saaremaa Parish; Saare County	Vilidu Mill (#1); 58°31′35.3″N 22°42′2.66″E	Post	1913	Left in photo	
Angla; Saaremaa Parish; Saare County	Viite Mill (#2)	Post	1910	Centre in photo	
Angla; Saaremaa Parish; Saare County	Tedre Mill (#3)	Smock	1927		
Angla; Saaremaa Parish; Saare County	Reinu Mill (#4)	Post	19th century	Front in Photo	
Angla; Saaremaa Parish; Saare County	Laose Mill (#5)	Post	1880	Back in photo	
Anijala; Saaremaa Parish; Saare County		Tower	1901		
Ärina; Väike-Maarja Parish; Lääne-Viru County	Ärina windmill		1886		
Audevälja; Lääne-Harju Parish; Harju County	Möldre windmill				
Edise; Jõhvi Parish; Ida-Viru County	Jõhvi windmill		19th century		
Emmu; Lääneranna Parish; Pärnu County	Keblaste manor windmill		19th century II half		
Ervita; Järva Parish; Järva County			19th century		
Esiküla; Hiiumaa Parish; Hiiu County	Ristete windmill	Post	19th century		
Hagudi; Rapla Parish; Rapla County			1870		
Koguva; Muhu Parish; Saare County		Post			
Koguva; Muhu Parish; Saare County		Post			
Köisi; Järva Parish; Järva County	Köisi windmill		1800		
Kuie; Tapa Parish; Lääne-Viru County	Kuie windmill		1834		
Kuigatsi; Otepää Parish; Valga County	Kuigatsi manor windmill		prob. 19th century II half		
Kukka; Hiiumaa Parish; Hiiu County		Post	1837		
Kuremaa; Jõgeva Parish; Jõgeva County	Kuremaa manor windmill				
Kuressaare; Saaremaa Parish; Saare County	Kuressaare windmill		1899	Now used as a tavern	
Kurisoo; Järva Parish; Järva County	Kurisoo manor windmill		19th century I half		
Kursi; Tapa Parish; Lääne-Viru County	Einmanni manor windmill		19th century II half		
Käesalu; Lääne-Harju Parish; Harju County	Käesalu manor windmill				
Lihula; Lääneranna Parish; Pärnu County	Lihula manor windmill		enf of 18th century		
Linnaaluste; Kehtna Parish; Rapla County	Keava manor windmill		18th century		
Maardu; Jõelähtme Parish; Harju County	Maardu manor windmill				
Malla; Viru-Nigula Parish; Lääne-Viru County	Malla manor windmill		19th century II half		
Muuga; Vinni Parish; Lääne-Viru County	Muuga manor windmill		end of 19th century		
Nõmmküla; Muhu Parish; Saare County	Uuetalu farm windmill		1908–1911		
Ohessaare; Saaremaa Parish; Saare County		Post			
Õngu; Hiiumaa Parish; Hiiu County		Post	1922		
Pärsti; Viljandi Parish; Viljandi County	Pärsti manor windmill		middle of 19th century		
Partsi; Hiiumaa Parish; Hiiu County			middle of 19th century		
Peetri; Rae Parish; Harju County			1868		
Põlma; Rapla Parish; Rapla County	Järvakandi windmill		beginning of 19th century		
Põlva; Põlva Parish; Põlva County	Prangli windmill		1901	originally in Prangli but moved to Põlva Peasant Museum in 1974.	
Porkuni; Tapa Parish; Lääne-Viru County	Porkuni manor windmill		end of 18th or first quarter of 19th century		
Pootsi; Pärnu; Pärnu County	Pootsi manor windmill		middle of 19th century (prob. 1832)		
Puhja; Elva Parish; Tartu County	Koni windmill		1893		
Purdi; Paide; Järva County	Purdi manor windmill		19th century I half or earlier		
Rägavere; Rakvere Parish; Lääne-Viru County	Rägavere manor windmill		beginning of 19th century		
Rahivere; Jõgeva Parish; Jõgeva County	Saare manor windmill				
Rakvere; Lääne-Viru County	Rakvere windmill		beginning of 19th century		
Rakvere; Lääne-Viru County	Vallimäe windmill		1797–1798		
Rälby; Vormsi Parish; Lääne County		Post			
Rasina; Põlva Parish; Põlva County	Rasina manor windmill				
Rupsi; Peipsiääre Parish; Tartu County	Kärneri windmill		1891		
Salinõmme; Hiiumaa Parish; Hiiu County		Post	1880	On Saarnaki island.	
Seidla; Järva Parish; Järva County	Seidla manor windmill		18th century II half		
Suislepa; Viljandi Parish; Viljandi County	Uue-Suislepa manor windmill		19th century		
Suuremõisa; Vormsi Parish; Lääne County	Suuremõisa manor windmill		end of the 18th century – 19th century I quarter		
Tabivere; Tartu Parish; Tartu County			1900s	Has been used as a café and youth centre.	
Tallinn; Harju County	Veski kõrts		19th century	Originally in Laiuse, moved to Sassukvere in 1880, and in 2003 to Kadaka, Tallinn and is used as a pub.	
Tamme; Elva Parish; Tartu County			1875–1899		
Tsooru; Antsla Parish; Võru County	Tsooru manor windmill		1880		
Tubala; Hiiumaa Parish; Hiiu County		Post	1886		
Tudulinna; Alutaguse Parish; Ida-Viru County			19th/20th century		
Vaimõisa; Märjamaa Parish; Rapla County	Vaimõisa manor windmill		19th century		
Valistre; Põhja-Pärnumaa Parish; Pärnu County	Mardi windmill		1920s–1930s		
Valtu; Rapla Parish; Rapla County	Valtu manor windmill (Puraviku windmill)		before 1815		
Vao; Väike-Maarja Parish; Lääne-Viru County	Vao manor windmill		1786		
Varbevere; Jõgeva Parish; Jõgeva County					
Vasta; Viru-Nigula Parish; Lääne-Viru County	Vasta manor windmill		19th century		
Vihula; Haljala Parish; Lääne-Viru County	Vihula manor windmill		1860		
Võhma; Saaremaa Parish; Saare County	Veski farm windmill		1924		
Võhmuta; Tapa Parish; Lääne-Viru County	Võhmuta manor windmill		19th century		
