= Kõrveküla (disambiguation) =

Kõrveküla may refer to several places in Estonia:

- Kõrveküla, small borough in Tartu Parish, Tartu County
- Kõrveküla, Kadrina Parish, village in Kadrina Parish, Lääne-Viru County
- Kõrveküla, Tapa Parish, village in Tapa Parish, Lääne-Viru County
