= Lapi =

Lapi may refer to:

== People with the surname ==
- Allegra Lapi (born 1985), Italian water polo player
- Eduardo Lapi (born 1964), Venezuelan politician
- Giulia Lapi (born 1985), Italian synchronized swimmer
- Laura Lapi (born 1970), Italian tennis player
- Niccolò Lapi (1667-1732), Italian painter

== Places ==
- Lapi, Estonia
- Cagayan Province, Philippines (formerly Lapi)
- Läpi, Estonia

== See also ==
- Łapy, Poland
