= Sääse =

Former borough in Estonia

- Location within Estonia
- Coordinates: 59°9′31″N 26°9′14″E
- Country: Estonia
- County: Lääne-Viru County
- Parish: Tapa Parish
- Time zone: UTC+2 (EET)

Sääse was a small borough (alevik) in Tamsalu Parish (1991–2017) and Tapa Parish (2017–2021) in Lääne-Viru County in northern Estonia. On 25 September 2021 Sääse small borough was dissolved ad its territory was merged into the town of Tamsalu.
