= Rägavere =

Rägavere may refer to several places in Estonia:

- Rägavere, Rakvere Parish, village in Rakvere Parish, Lääne-Viru County
- Rägavere, Tapa Parish, village in Tapa Parish, Lääne-Viru County
- Rägavere Parish, former municipality in Lääne-Viru County
