= Patika =

Patika may refer to:

- Patika, Harju County, village in Rae Parish, Harju County, Estonia
- Patika, Lääne-Viru County, village in Tapa Parish, Lääne-Viru County, Estonia
- Patika Kusulaka, Indo-Scythian satrap in the northwestern South Asia during the 1st century BCE
- Patika or Patehka, tehsil of Muzaffarabad District, Pakistan
