= Karkuse =

Karkuse may refer to several places in Estonia:

- Karkuse, Tapa Parish, village in Lääne-Viru County, Estonia
- Karkuse, Vinni Parish, village in Lääne-Viru County, Estonia
