= Saiakopli =

Village in Estonia

Coordinates: 59°13′N 26°04′E

- Village
- Interactive map of Saiakopli
- Country: Estonia
- County: Lääne-Viru County
- Parish: Tapa Parish
- Time zone: UTC+2 (EET)
  - Summer (DST): UTC+3 (EEST)

Saiakopli is a village in Tapa Parish, Lääne-Viru County, in northeastern Estonia. It's located about 7.5 km (5 mi) southeast of the town of Tapa and about 7 km (4 mi) northwest of Tamsalu. Saiakopli is bordered by the Tallinn–Tapa–Tartu railway to the southwest and by the Valgejõgi River to the northwest.
