= Turje =

Turje (Macedonian: Турје) may refer to:

- Ganochora, a village in Pieria, Greece, formerly called Turje
- Turje, Debarca, a village in Debarca Municipality, North Macedonia
- Turje, Hrastnik, a village in the Municipality of Hrastnik, Slovenia
- Türje, a village in Zala County, Hungary
  - Türje (genus), a clan originating from Türje village
- Türje, Estonia, a village in Tapa Parish, Lääne-Viru County, Estonia

== See also ==
- Turie, a village and municipality in Žilina District, Žilina Region, Slovakia
