= Moe, Estonia =

Village in Estonia

Moe
- Village
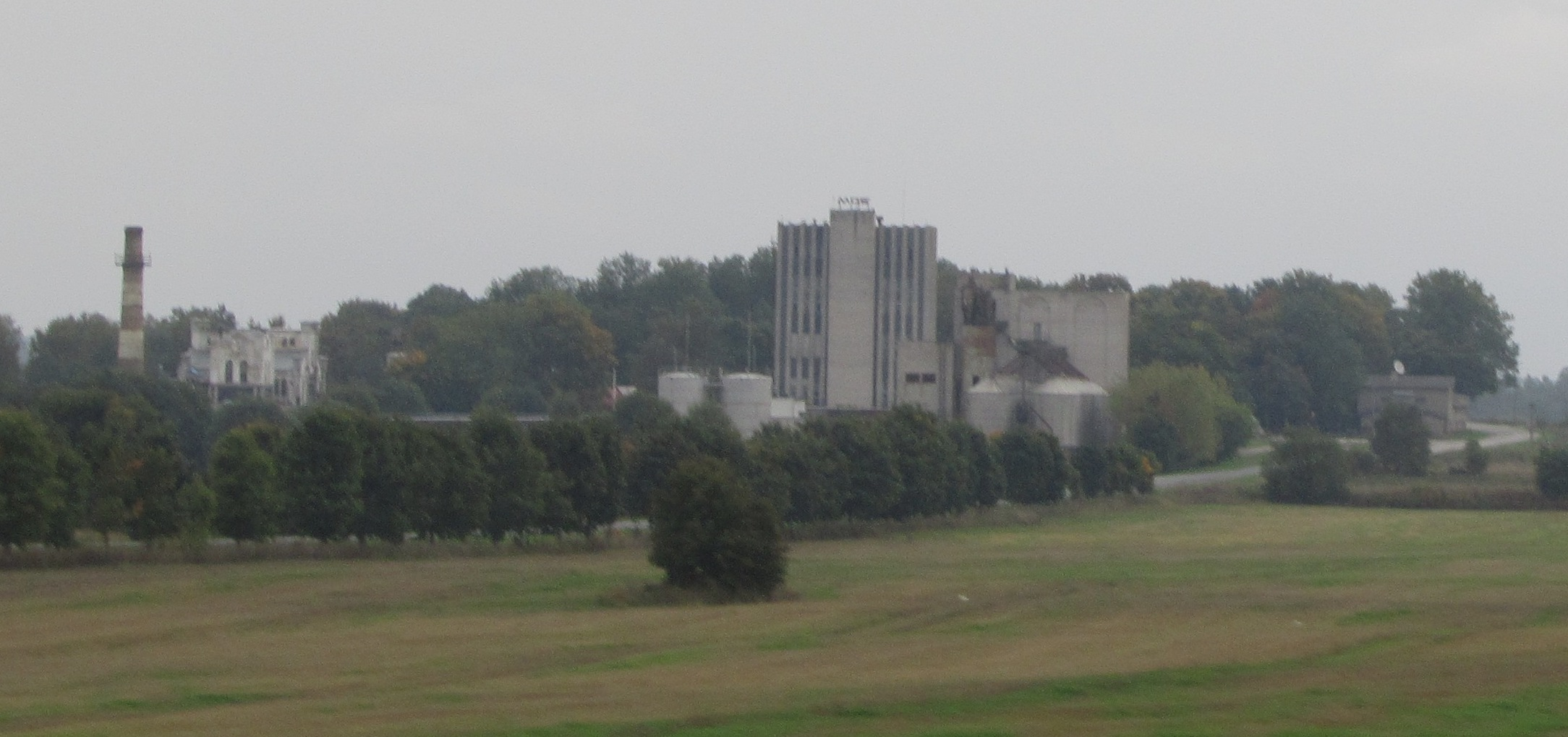
- Moe distillery

- Location in Estonia
- Coordinates: 59°15′39″N 25°59′43″E
- Country: Estonia
- County: Lääne-Viru County
- Municipality: Tapa Parish

Population (2011 Census)
  - Total: 206

Moe is a village in Tapa Parish, Lääne-Viru County, in northern Estonia. It's located about 3.5 km southeast of the town of Tapa, on the Valgejõgi River. Moe is passed by the Pärnu–Rakvere road (nr 5), and is bordered by the Tallinn–Tapa–Tartu railway to the southwest. As of the 2011 census, the settlement's population was 206.

Moe knight manor (Muddis) was first mentioned in 1500 when it belonged to Hermann Rothase. In 1566 it was 12 hides large. It was also the first record about Moe (Muddus) and Koluotsa (Kollotz), villages owned by the manor. In 1887 the new Estonian owner Jakob Kurberg established a modern distillery which became one of the largest in Estonia. It operated until 2009. The Estonian Distillery Industry Museum (Eesti Piiritusetööstuse Muuseum) is opened in the old vodka kitchen.
