= Nõmmküla, Tapa Parish =

Village in Estonia

Coordinates: 59°12′N 26°02′E

Nõmmküla
- Village
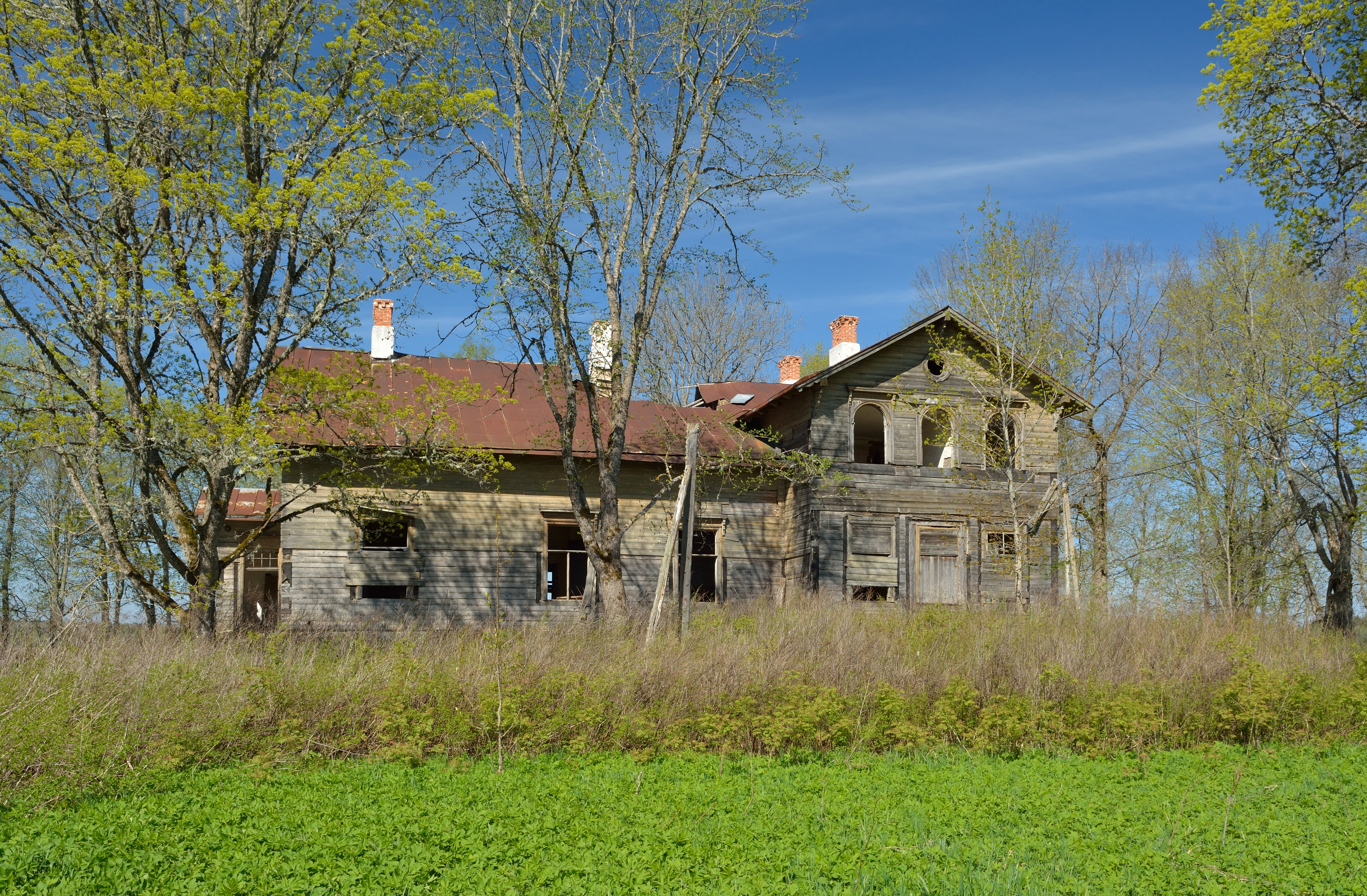
- Ruins of Nõmmküla manor main building
- Interactive map of Nõmmküla
- Country: Estonia
- County: Lääne-Viru County
- Parish: Tapa Parish
- Time zone: UTC+2 (EET)
  - Summer (DST): UTC+3 (EEST)

Nõmmküla (German: Nömküll) is a village in Tapa Parish, Lääne-Viru County, in northeastern Estonia.
