= Imastu =

Village in Estonia

- Village
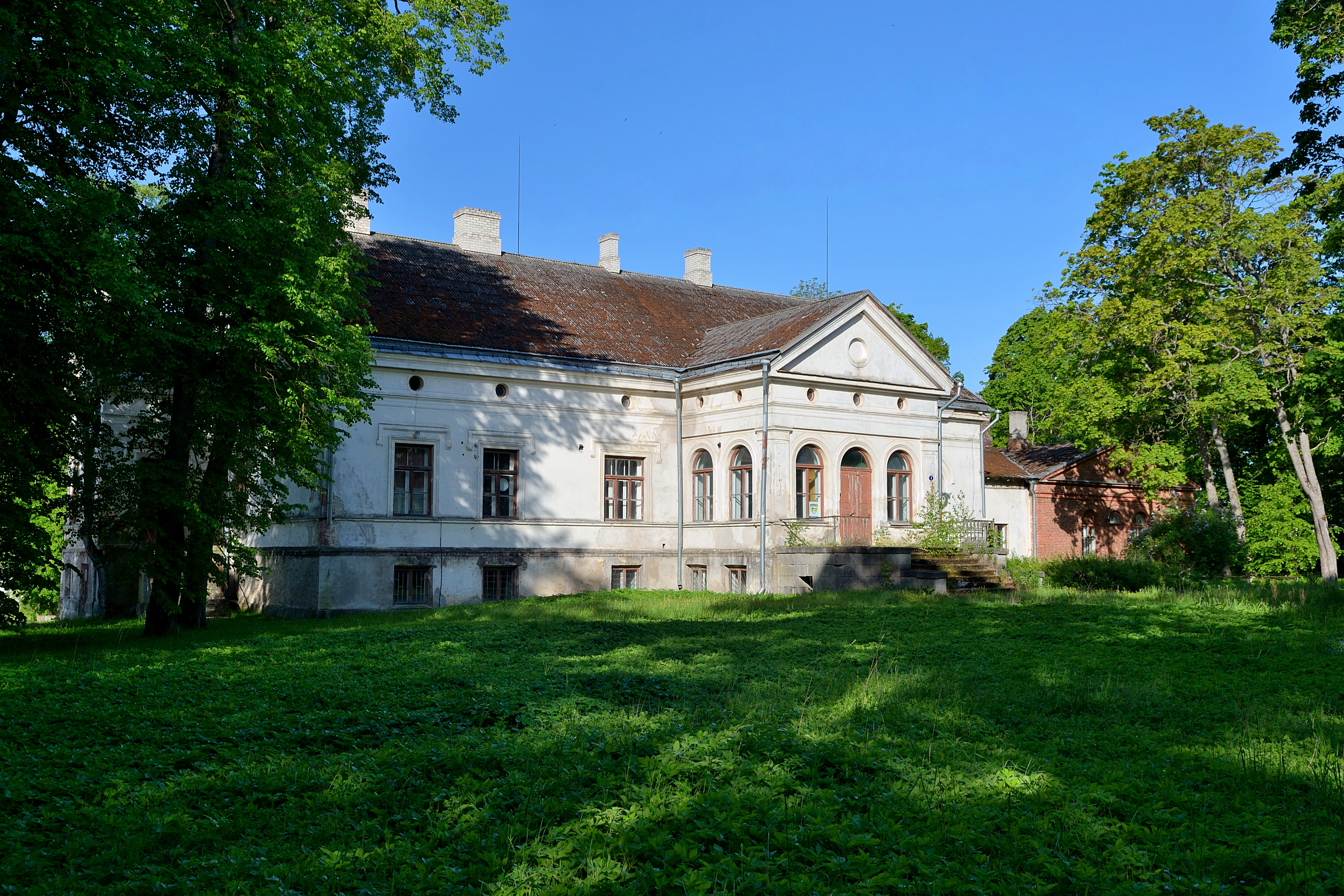
- Imastu manor

- Location in Estonia
- Coordinates: 59°16′N 26°00′E
- Country: Estonia
- County: Lääne-Viru County
- Parish: Tapa Parish
- Time zone: UTC+2 (EET)
  - Summer (DST): UTC+3 (EEST)

Imastu is a village in Tapa Parish, Lääne-Viru County, in northern Estonia. It is located about 2.5 km (2 mi) east of the town of Tapa. Imastu is bordered by the Pärnu–Rakvere road (no. 5) to the southeast, the Tallinn–Tapa–Narva railway to the northwest and the Valgejõgi River to the southwest.

== Imastu Manor ==
Imastu knight manor (German: Mönnikorb) was first mentioned in written records in 1447. The present-day building was built in the 1880s by master builder Friedrich Modi from Rakvere. It is an eclectic, irregular building with neo-Romanesque details. Ornamental painted ceilings and tiled stoves have been preserved.
