= Räsna, Lääne-Viru County =

Village in Estonia

Coordinates: 59°12′N 25°51′E

Räsna
- Village
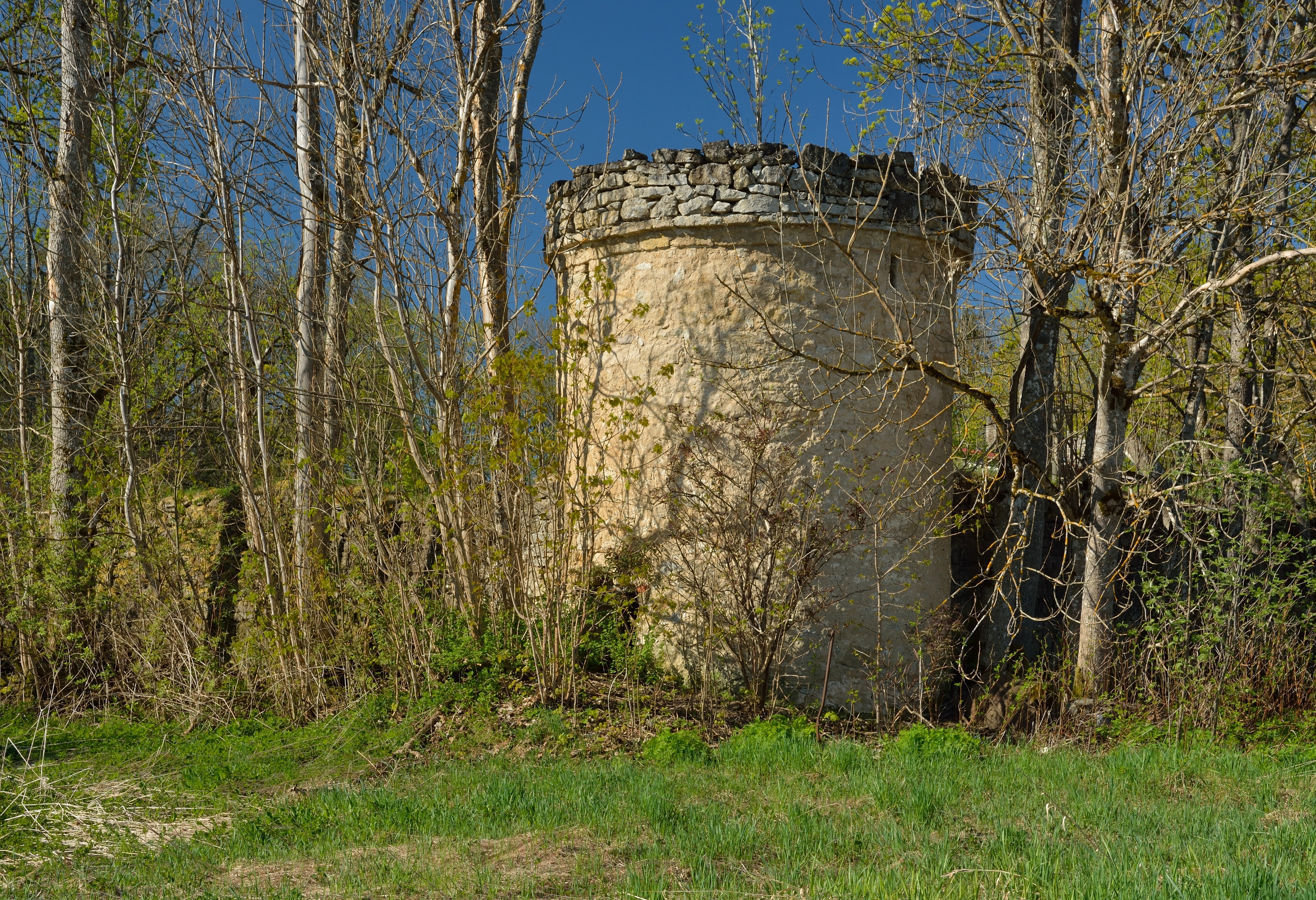
- Corner tower of the Kuru manor enclosure wall
- Interactive map of Räsna
- Country: Estonia
- County: Lääne-Viru County
- Parish: Tapa Parish
- Time zone: UTC+2 (EET)
  - Summer (DST): UTC+3 (EEST)

Räsna is a village in Tapa Parish, Lääne-Viru County, in northeastern Estonia.
