= Tõõrakõrve =

Village in Estonia

- Village
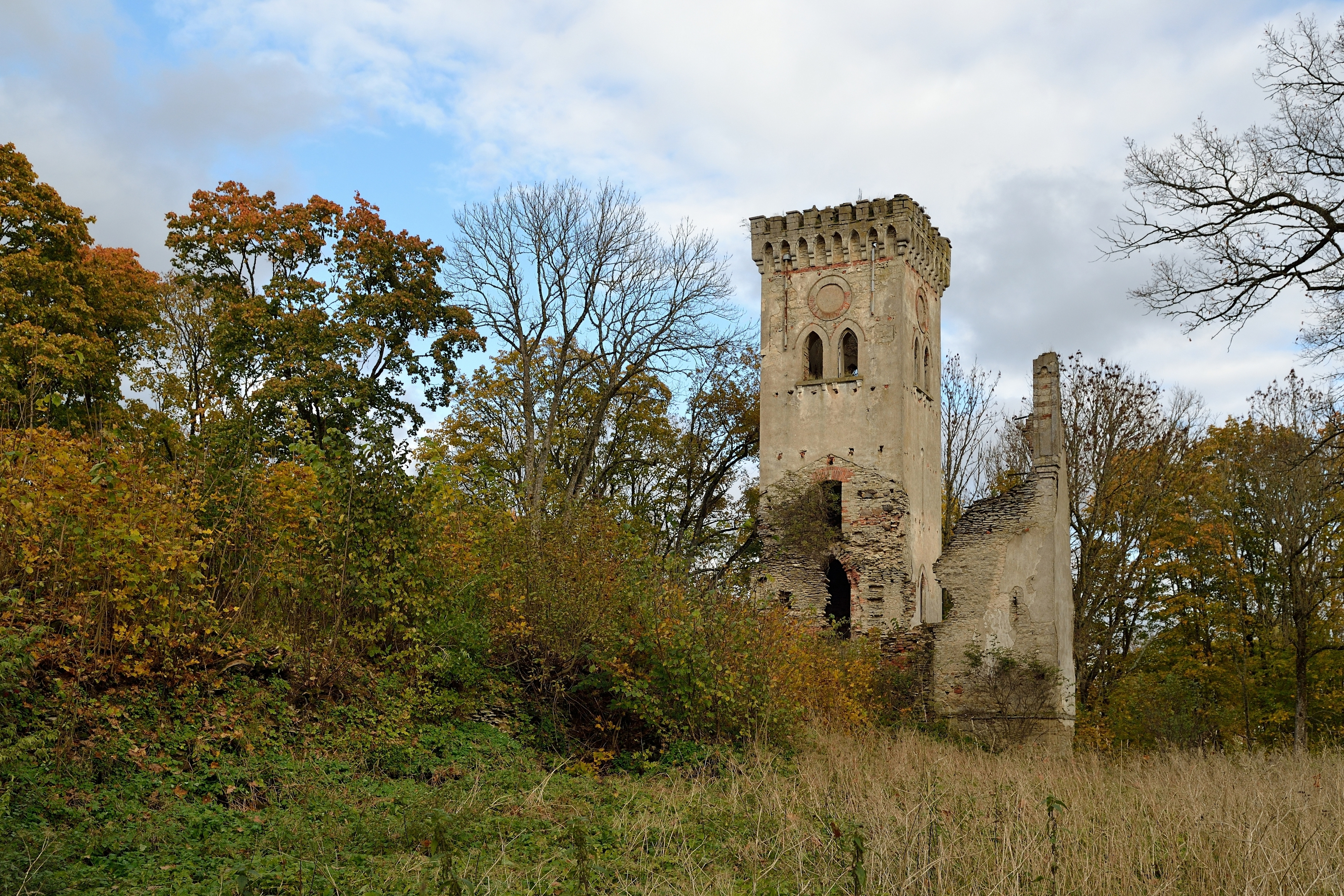
- Ruins of Lehtse Manor

- Location in Estonia
- Coordinates: 59°16′N 25°52′E
- Country: Estonia
- County: Lääne-Viru County
- Parish: Tapa Parish
- Time zone: UTC+2 (EET)
  - Summer (DST): UTC+3 (EEST)

Tõõrakõrve is a village in Tapa Parish, Lääne-Viru County, in northeastern Estonia.

== Lehtse Manor ==
The ruins of the Manor House of Lehtse (German: Lechts) can be seen in Tõõrakõrve village. The first written records of the manorial estate date from 1467, and through the centuries it belonged to various Baltic German families, such as those of Rosen, Derfelden and Hoyningen-Huene. During the late 19th century, a large and luxurious Gothic Revival country house was erected, of which today only the ruins remain.
