= Jootme, Lääne-Viru County =

Village in Estonia

Coordinates: 59°13′N 25°54′E

Jootme
- Village
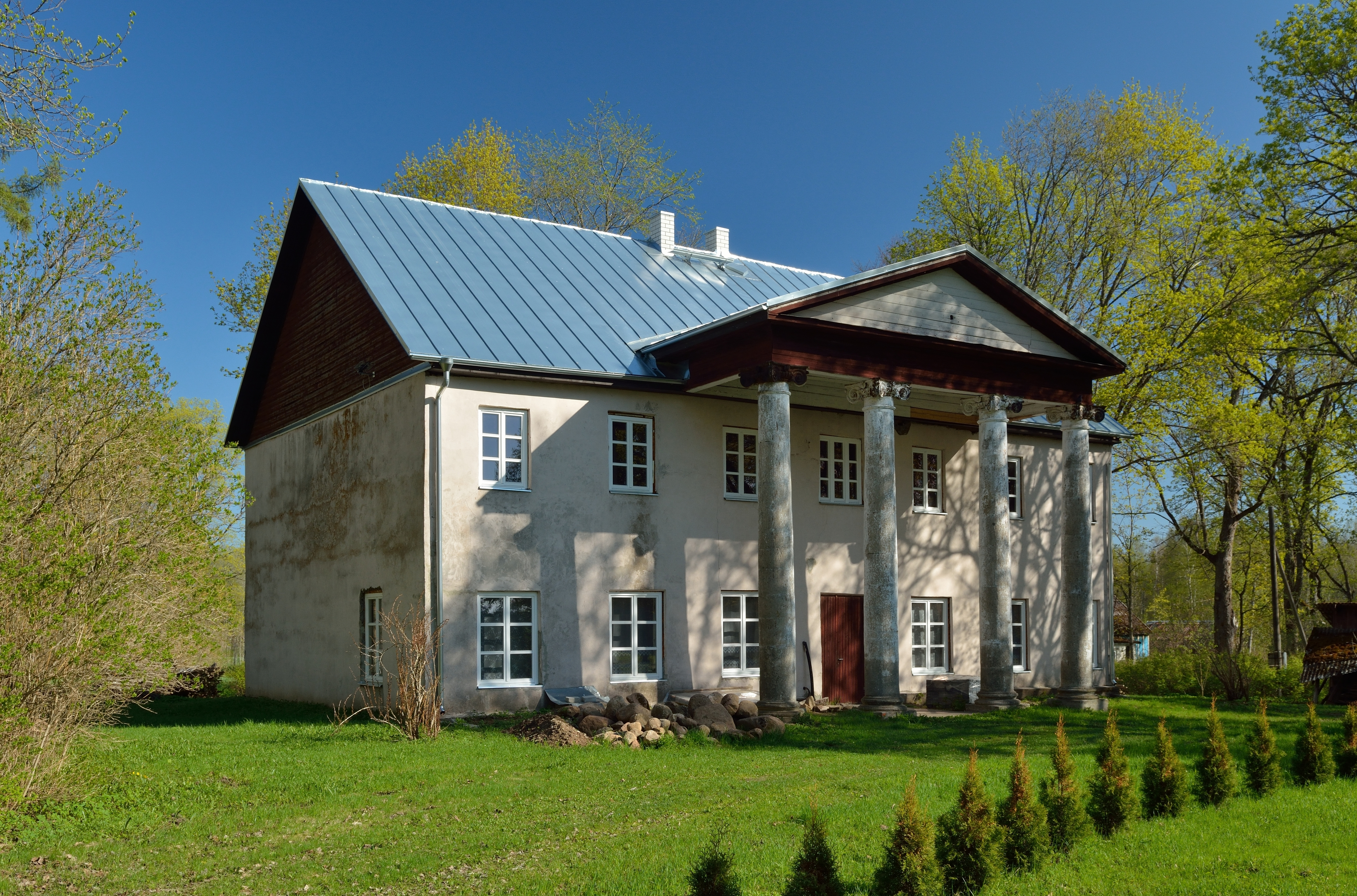
- Partly remained Jootme manor main building
- Interactive map of Jootme
- Country: Estonia
- County: Lääne-Viru County
- Parish: Tapa Parish
- Time zone: UTC+2 (EET)
  - Summer (DST): UTC+3 (EEST)

Jootme is a village in Tapa Parish, Lääne-Viru County in northeastern Estonia.
