= Vahakulmu =

Village in Estonia

Coordinates: 59°15′N 26°03′E

- Village
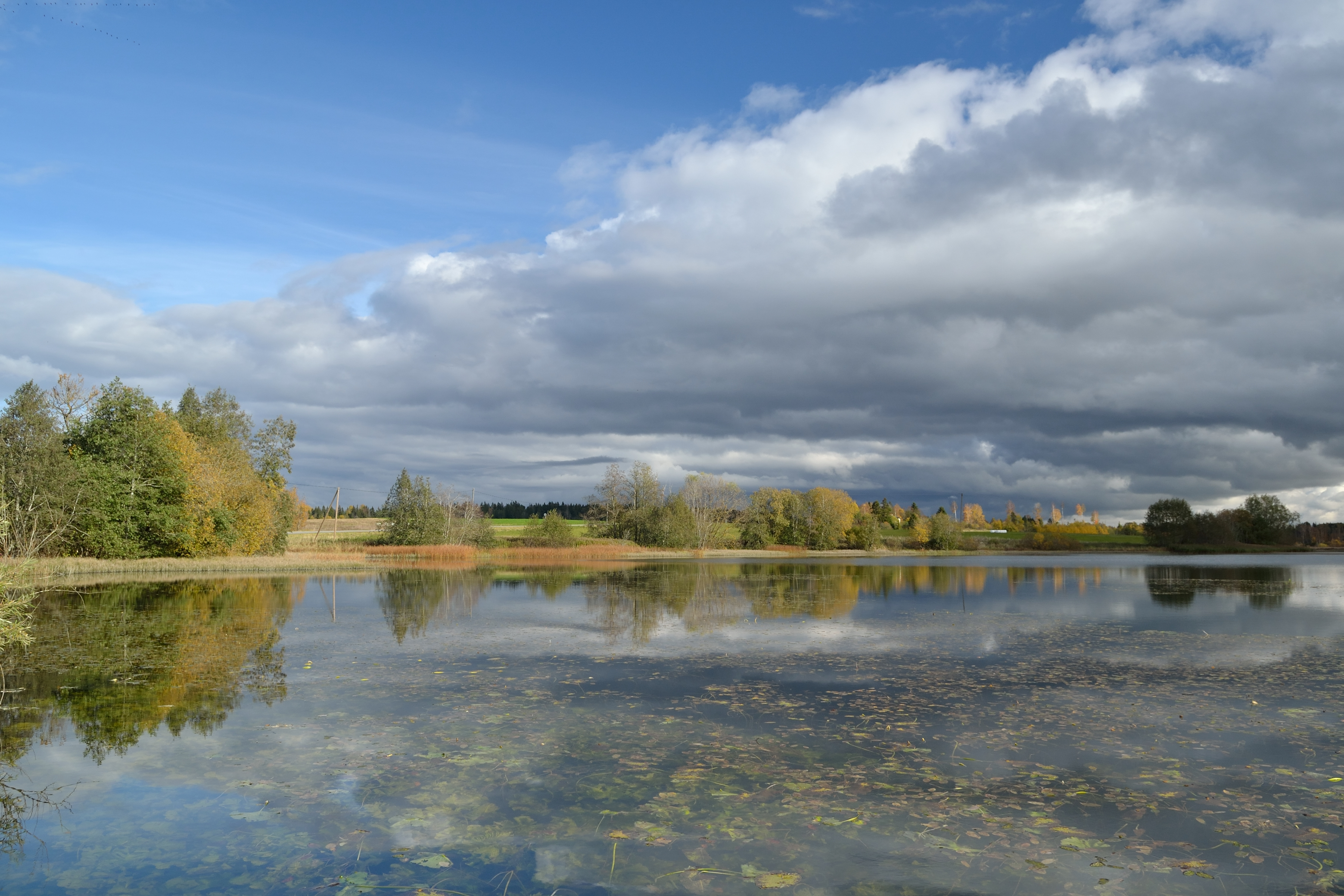
- Vahakulmu impounded lake
- Interactive map of Vahakulmu
- Country: Estonia
- County: Lääne-Viru County
- Parish: Tapa Parish
- Time zone: UTC+2 (EET)
  - Summer (DST): UTC+3 (EEST)

Vahakulmu is a village in Tapa Parish, Lääne-Viru County, in northeastern Estonia. It lies on the Valgejõgi River, where an impounded lake and ruins of watermill are situated.

== Gallery ==
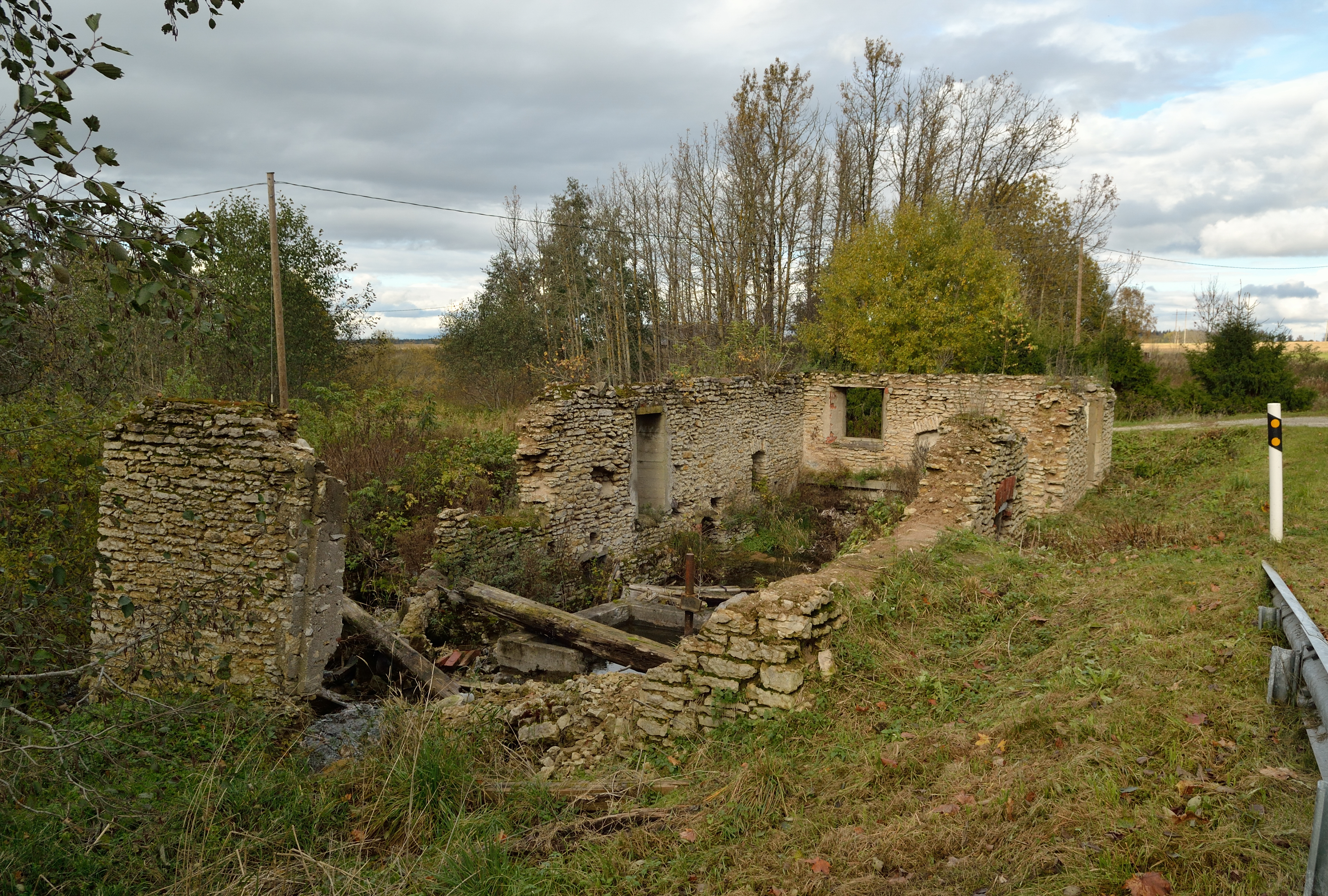
Vahakulmu watermill ruins.

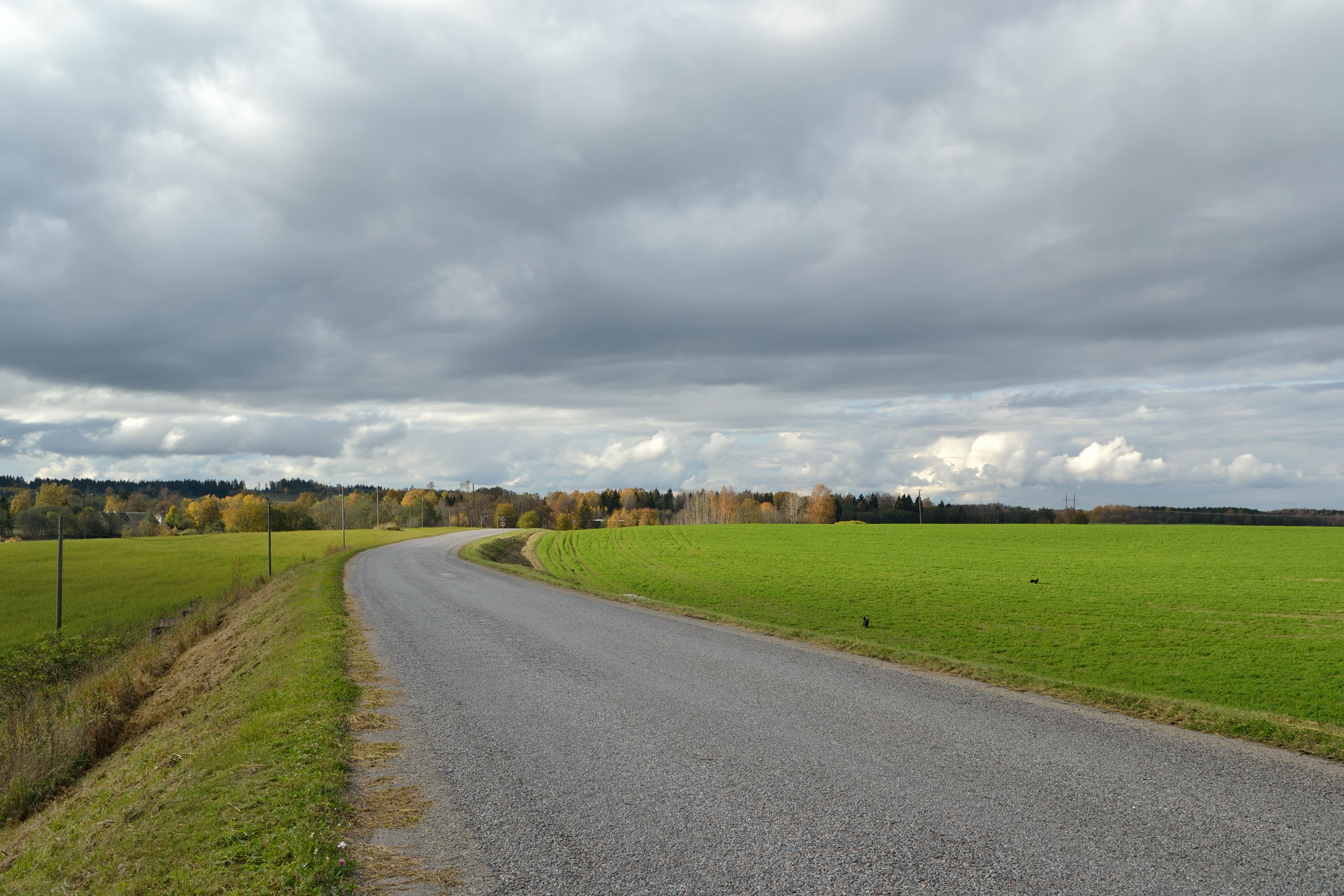
Jõepere-Vahakulmu road in village.
