= Naistevälja =

Village in Estonia

Coordinates: 59°11′47″N 26°06′24″E

- Village
- Interactive map of Naistevälja
- Country: Estonia
- County: Lääne-Viru County
- Parish: Tapa Parish
- Time zone: UTC+2 (EET)
  - Summer (DST): UTC+3 (EEST)

Naistevälja is a village in Tapa Parish, Lääne-Viru County, in northeastern Estonia. It was the birthplace of Hans Verner Puurand, who was the founder of Estonian Marine Forces.
