= Kõrveküla, Tapa Parish =

Village in Estonia

Coordinates: 59°13′27″N 25°40′03″E

Kõrveküla
- Village
- Interactive map of Kõrveküla
- Country: Estonia
- County: Lääne-Viru County
- Parish: Tapa Parish
- Time zone: UTC+2 (EET)
  - Summer (DST): UTC+3 (EEST)

Kõrveküla is a village in Tapa Parish, Lääne-Viru County, in northeastern Estonia. According to the 2021 census, the population of the village is 24 people.

== Gallery ==
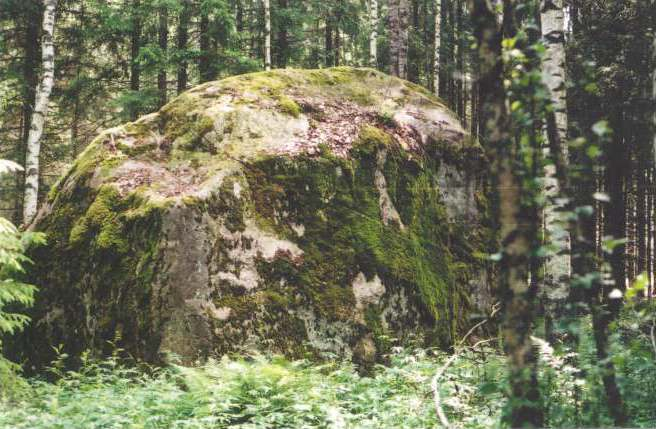
Rehessaare glacial erratic in Kõrveküla's territory.
