= Assamalla =

Village in Estonia

Coordinates: 59°14′N 26°16′E

- Village
- Interactive map of Assamalla
- Country: Estonia
- County: Lääne-Viru County
- Parish: Tapa Parish
- Time zone: UTC+2 (EET)
  - Summer (DST): UTC+3 (EEST)

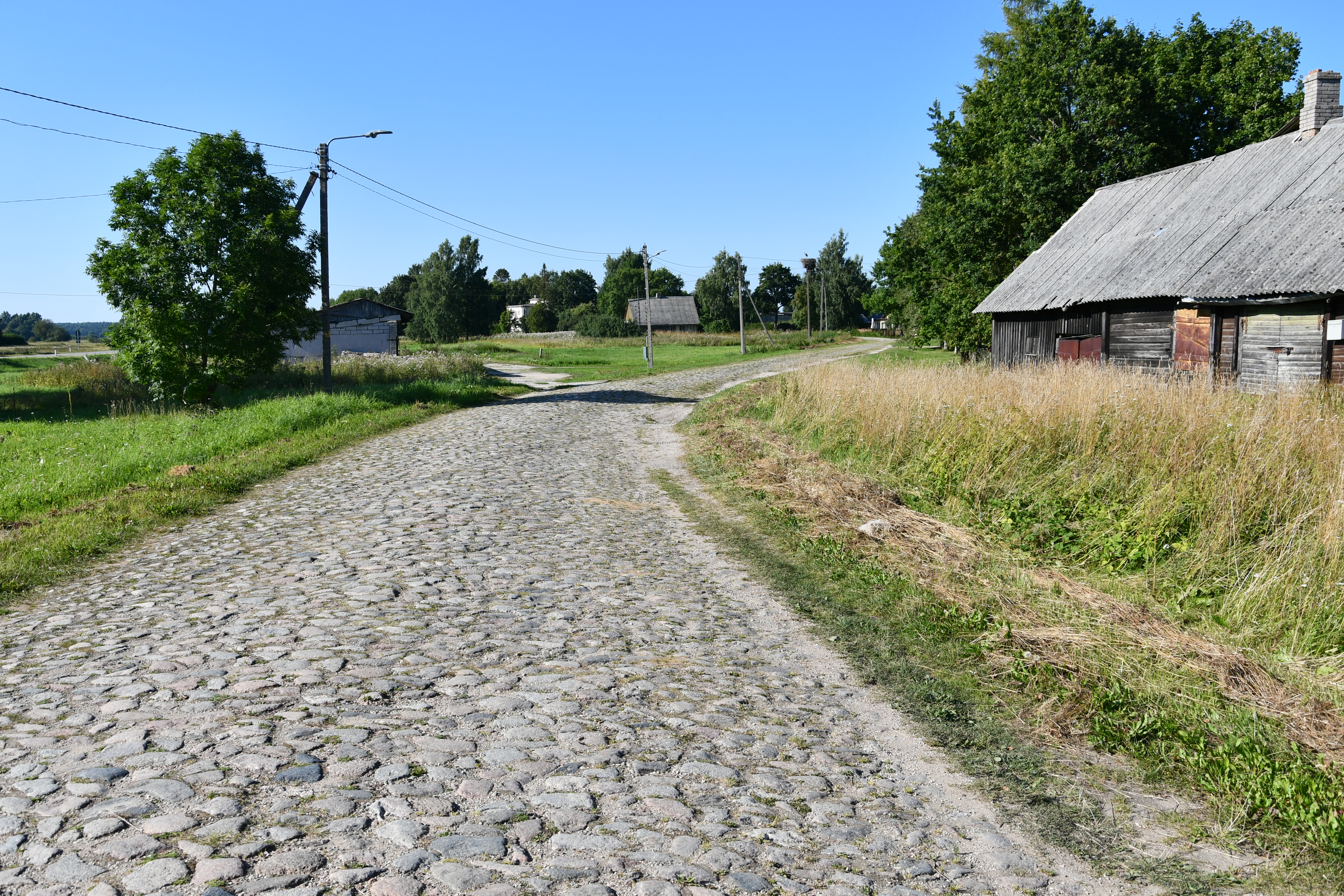
Cobblestone road in Assamalla village, Tapa municipality

Assamalla is a village in Tapa Parish, Lääne-Viru County, in northeastern Estonia.

Estonian auto racing driver Enn Griffel (1935–2007) was born in Assamalla.
