= Loksa, Lääne-Viru County =

Village in Estonia

Loksa Loksu
- Village
- Location in Estonia
- Coordinates: 59°09′53″N 26°10′51″E
- Country: Estonia
- County: Lääne-Viru County
- Parish: Tapa Parish

Population (31 December 2011)
  - Total: 53
- Time zone: UTC+2 (EET)
  - Summer (DST): UTC+3 (EEST)

Loksa is a village in Tapa Parish, Lääne-Viru County, in northeastern Estonia.
