= Tapa Parish =

Municipality of Estonia (2017)

Coordinates: 59.266667°N 25.95°E

Tapa Parish Tapa vald
- Municipality of Estonia
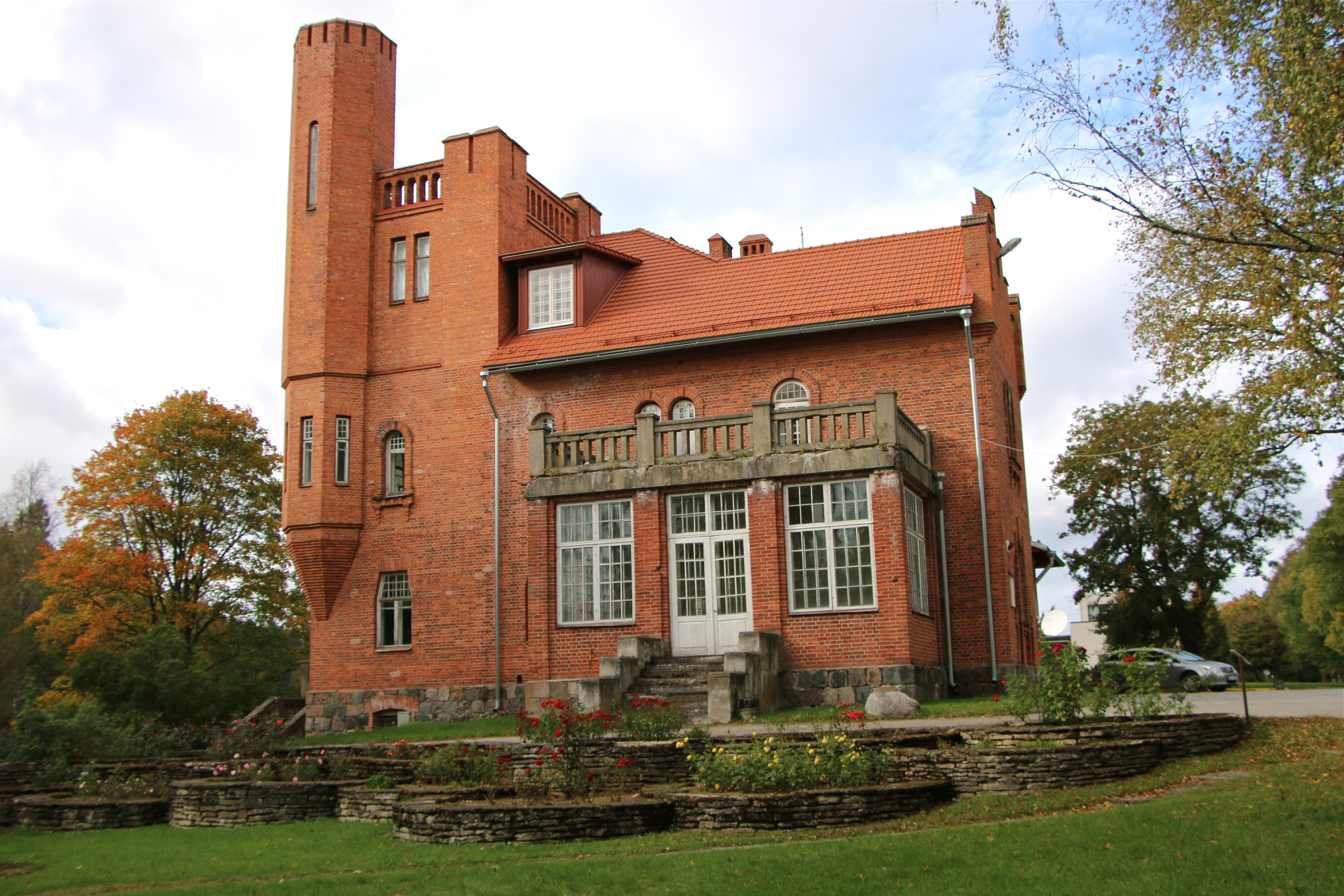
- Jäneda manor

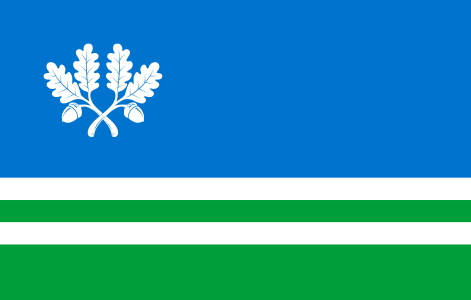
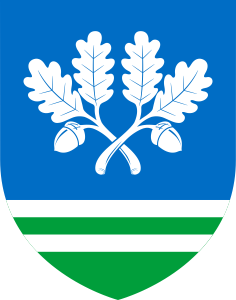
- Flag Coat of arms

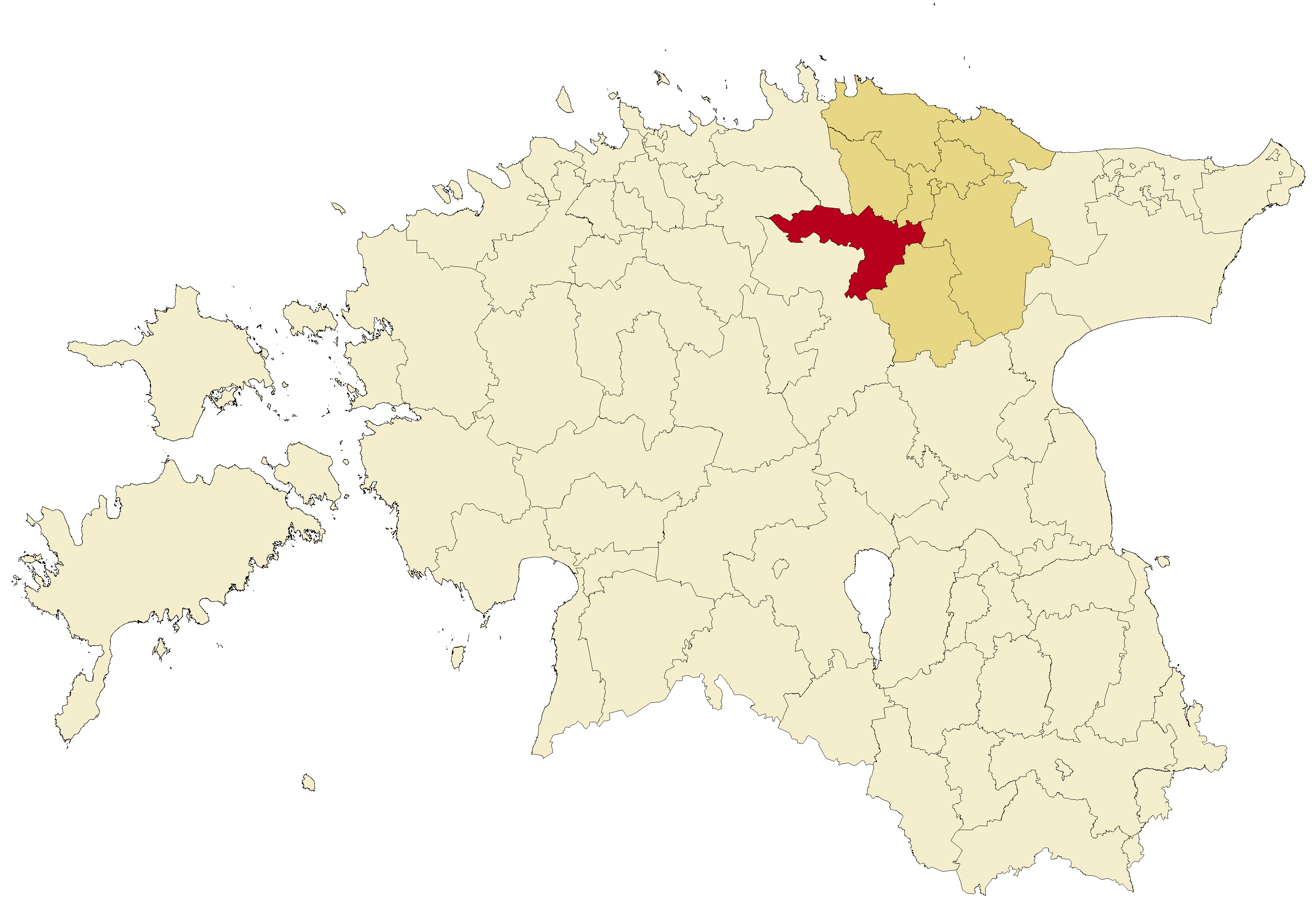
- Tapa Parish within Lääne-Viru County
- Country: Estonia
- County: Lääne-Viru County
- Administrative centre: Tapa

Government
  - Mayor: Riho Tell

Area
  - Total: 480 km^{2} (190 sq mi)

Population (2018)
  - Total: 11,049
  - Density: 23/km^{2} (60/sq mi)
- ISO 3166 code: EE-792
- Website: www.tapa.ee

Tapa Parish (Estonian: Tapa vald) is a rural municipality in Lääne-Viru County in northern Estonia.

The administrative centre of the municipality is the town of Tapa. It is located 70 km east of Estonia's capital, Tallinn.

== History ==
Tapa Parish was established by merging in October 2005 the town of Tapa with Lehtse and Saksi rural municipalities and in October 2017 the Tapa and Tamsalu rural municipalities.

== Religion ==
Religion in Tapa Parish (2021)
1. Unaffiliated (76.0%)
2. Orthodox (11.3%)
3. Lutheran (5.70%)
4. Other Christians (2.90%)
5. Other religions or unknown (4.10%)

== Local government ==
Chairman of the Council (Estonian: volikogu esimees):

- 2017-2018 - Toomas Uudeberg
- from 2018 - Maksim Butšenkov

Mayor (Estonian: vallavanem):

- 2017-2018 - Alari Kirt
- from 2018 - Riho Tell

== Geography ==
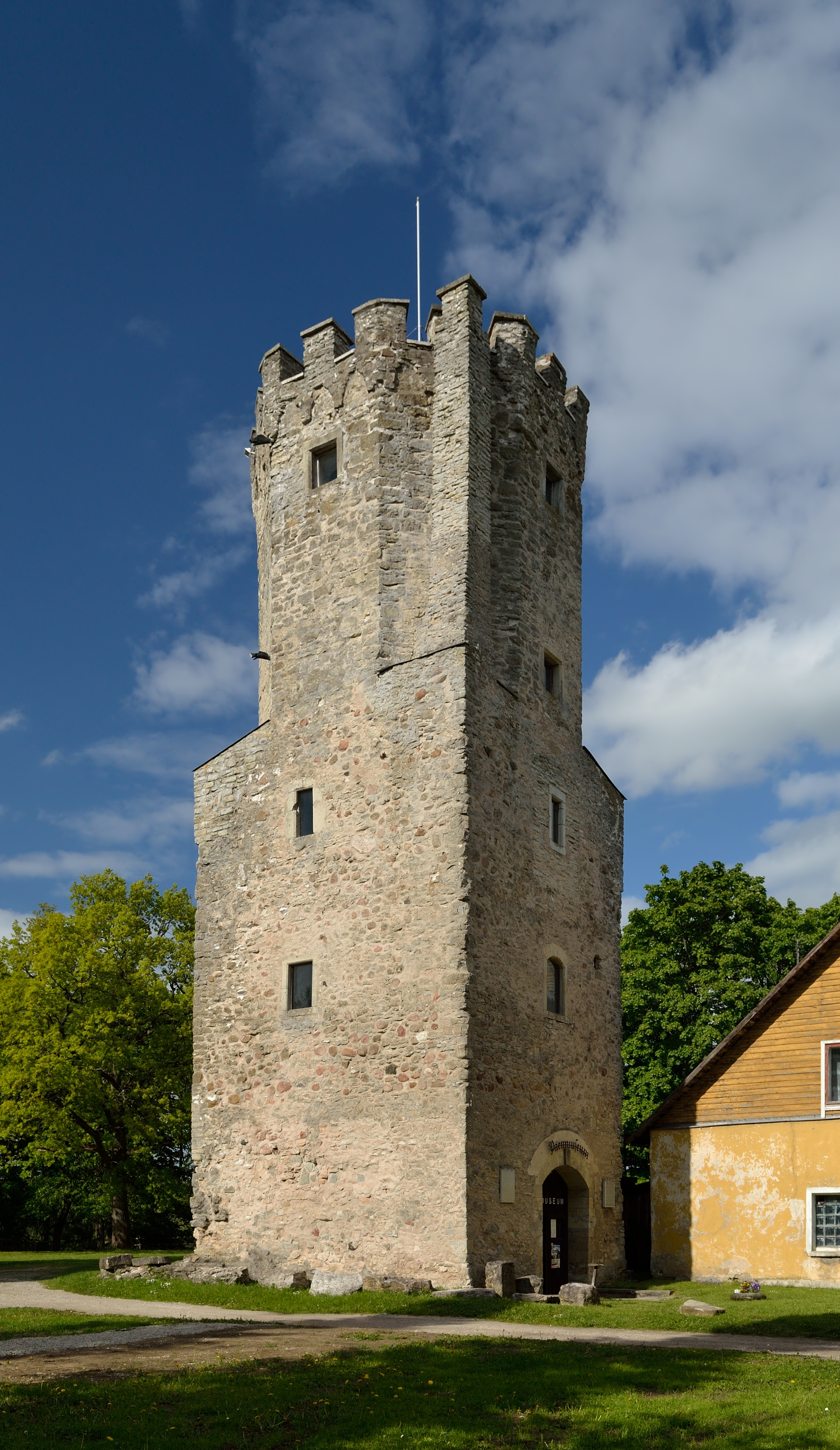
Porkuni Castle

=== Populated places ===
There are two towns Tapa and Tamsalu, one small borough Lehtse and 55 villages: Aavere, Alupere, Araski, Assamalla, Imastu, Jootme, Jäneda, Järsi, Järvajõe, Kadapiku, Kaeva, Karkuse, Kerguta, Koiduküla, Koplitaguse, Kuie, Kullenga, Kursi, Kuru, Kõrveküla, Lemmküla, Linnape, Loksa, Loksu, Lokuta, Läpi, Läste, Metskaevu, Moe, Naistevälja, Nõmmküla, Näo, Patika, Piilu, Piisupi, Porkuni, Pruuna, Põdrangu, Rabasaare, Raudla, Rägavere, Räsna, Saiakopli, Saksi, Sauvälja, Savalduma, Tõõrakõrve, Türje, Uudeküla, Vadiküla, Vahakulmu, Vajangu, Vistla, Võhmetu, Võhmuta.

== Notable people ==
- Jaan Kalviste (1898 in Läste – 1936), chemist and mineralogist, killed in a mass explosion
- Voldemar Mägi (1914 in Lehtse – 1954), wrestler, competed as a Greco-Roman middleweight at the 1936 Summer Olympics
- Marko Pomerants (born 1964 in Tamsalu), politician, has held three government minister posts
- Kaili Sirge (born 1983 in Tamsalu), cross-country skier. She competed in five events at the 2006 Winter Olympics
- Elina Born (born 1994 in Lehtse), a singer, has sung twice at the Eurovision Song Contest
- Martin Himma (born 1999 in Tamsalu), cross-country skier, flagbearer at the 2022 Winter Olympics
