= Võhmetu =

Village in Estonia

Coordinates: 59°13′N 26°13′E

- Village
- Interactive map of Võhmetu
- Country: Estonia
- County: Lääne-Viru County
- Parish: Tapa Parish

Population (2011)
  - Total: 13
- Time zone: UTC+2 (EET)
  - Summer (DST): UTC+3 (EEST)

Võhmetu is a village in Tapa Parish, Lääne-Viru County, in northeastern Estonia. The population during the 2011 census was 100% native Estonian.
