= Kaeva =

Village in Estonia

- Village
- Location within Estonia
- Coordinates: 59°09′N 26°05′E
- Country: Estonia
- County: Lääne-Viru County
- Parish: Tapa Parish
- Time zone: UTC+2 (EET)
  - Summer (DST): UTC+3 (EEST)

Kaeva is a village in Tapa Parish, Lääne-Viru County, in northeastern Estonia.
