= Vistla =

Village in Estonia

Coordinates: 59°11′14″N 26°10′22″E

- Village
- Interactive map of Vistla
- Country: Estonia
- County: Lääne-Viru County
- Parish: Tapa Parish
- Time zone: UTC+2 (EET)
  - Summer (DST): UTC+3 (EEST)

Vistla is a village in Tapa Parish, Lääne-Viru County, in northeastern Estonia. In 2000, Vistla had a population of 27.
