= Põdrangu =

Village in Estonia

Coordinates: 59°08′N 26°08′E

- Village
- Interactive map of Põdrangu
- Country: Estonia
- County: Lääne-Viru County
- Parish: Tapa Parish
- Time zone: UTC+2 (EET)
  - Summer (DST): UTC+3 (EEST)

Põdrangu is a village in Tapa Parish, Lääne-Viru County, in northeastern Estonia.
