= Uudeküla =

Village in Estonia

Coordinates: 59°10′33″N 26°07′39″E

- Village
- Interactive map of Uudeküla
- Country: Estonia
- County: Lääne-Viru County
- Parish: Tapa Parish
- Time zone: UTC+2 (EET)
  - Summer (DST): UTC+3 (EEST)

Uudeküla is a village in Tapa Parish, Lääne-Viru County, in northeastern Estonia.

Uudeküla Bulldogs RFC is a rugby union club based in Uudeküla.
