= Kõrveküla, Kadrina Parish =

Village in Estonia

Coordinates: 59°22′N 25°59′E

Kõrveküla
- Village
- Interactive map of Kõrveküla
- Country: Estonia
- County: Lääne-Viru County
- Parish: Kadrina Parish
- Time zone: UTC+2 (EET)
  - Summer (DST): UTC+3 (EEST)

Kõrveküla is a village in Kadrina Parish, Lääne-Viru County, in northeastern Estonia.
