= Varbevere =

Village in Estonia

- Village
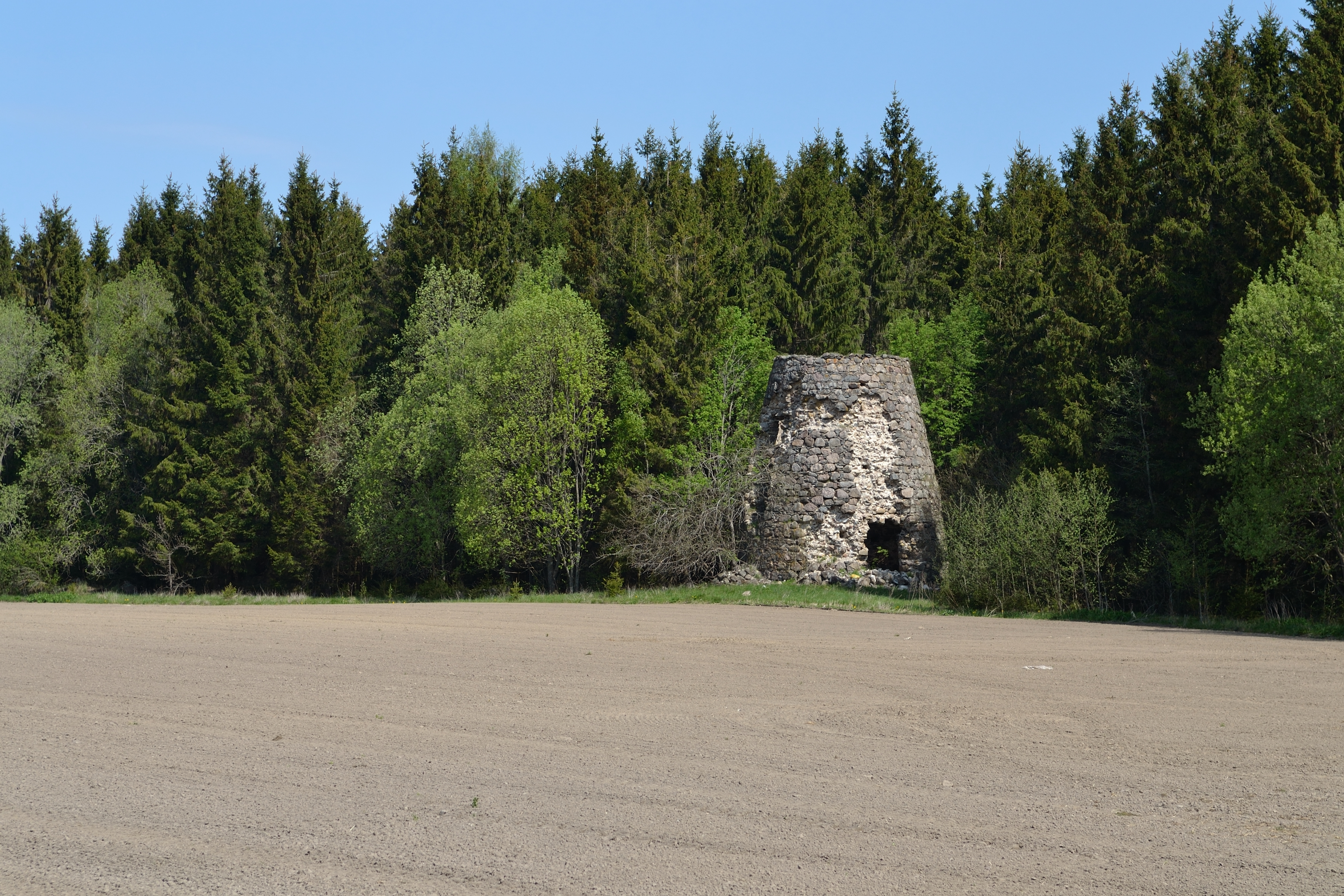
- Windmill ruins in Varbevere.

- Location in Estonia
- Coordinates: 58°42′58″N 26°39′24″E
- Country: Estonia
- County: Jõgeva County
- Municipality: Jõgeva Parish

Population (01.01.2011)
  - Total: 63

Varbevere (German: Warbofer) is a village in Jõgeva Parish, Jõgeva County in Estonia. It is located on the road between Palamuse and Voore, about 5 km (3 mi) from each. Varbevere has a population of 63 (as of 1 January 2011).
