= Kursi, Lääne-Viru County =

Village in Estonia

Coordinates: 59°08′21″N 26°01′50″E

Kursi
- Village
- Interactive map of Kursi
- Country: Estonia
- County: Lääne-Viru County
- Parish: Tapa Parish
- Time zone: UTC+2 (EET)
  - Summer (DST): UTC+3 (EEST)

Kursi is a village in Tapa Parish, Lääne-Viru County, in northeastern Estonia.
