= Tamsalu =

Town in Estonia

- Town
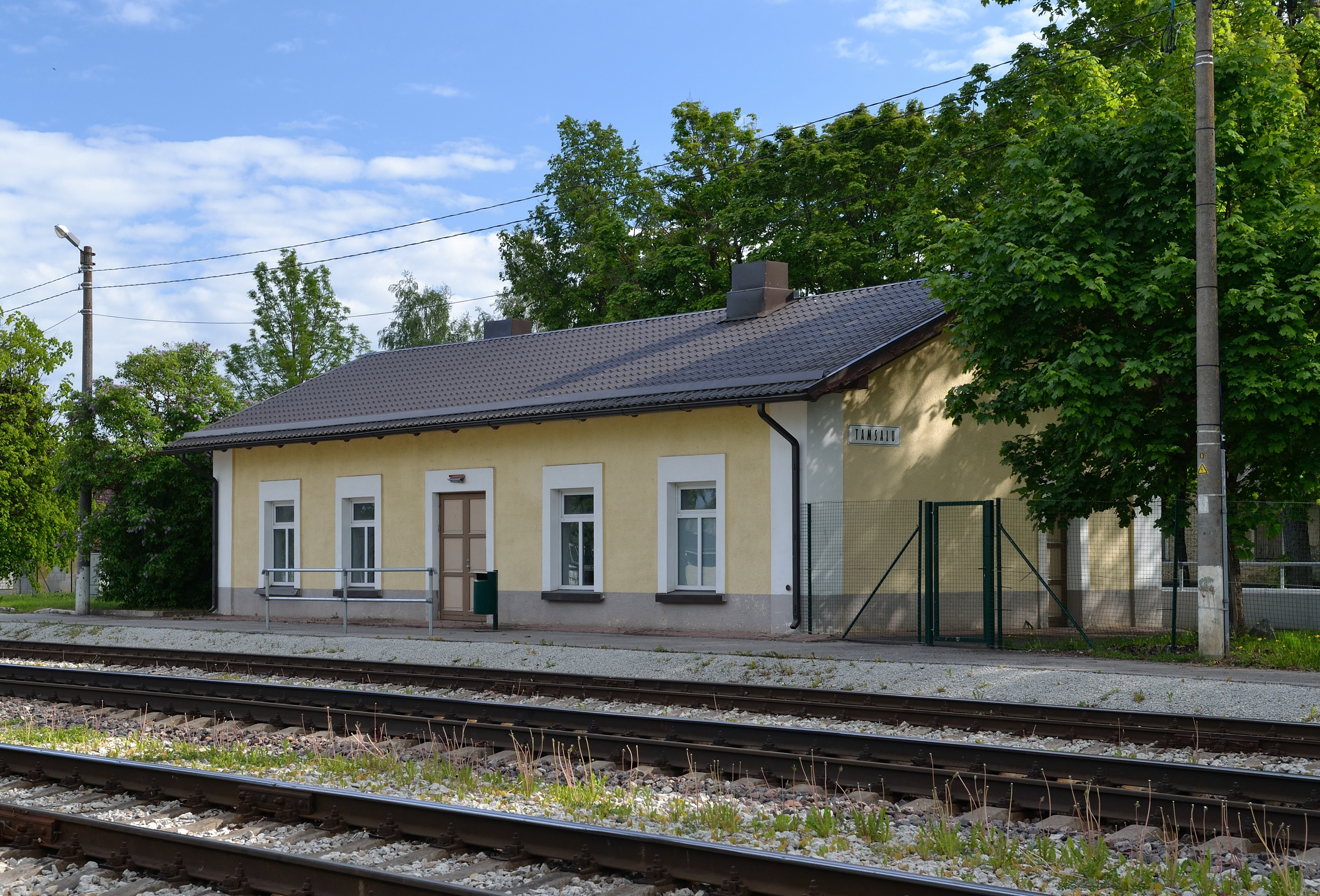
- Tamsalu train station

- Location in Estonia
- Coordinates: 59°9′32.4″N 26°6′28.8″E
- Country: Estonia
- County: Lääne-Viru County
- Municipality: Tapa Parish
- Town status: 22 October 1996

Population (31.12.2024)
  - Total: 2,397
  - Rank: 36th

Ethnicity (2021)
  - estonians: 82.4%
  - russians: 12.6%
  - other: 5.0%
- Time zone: UTC+2 (EET)
  - Summer (DST): UTC+3 (EEST)

Tamsalu is a town in Tapa Parish, Lääne-Viru County, Estonia.

The town has a station on the Tallinn-Tartu railway.

As of December 31, 2021, the town had a population of 2415.

== History ==
The settlement was first mentioned in 1512, but remained an insignificant village until 1876, when the Tallinn-Tartu railway was built. The settlement became a town in 1996. Before the administrative reform in 2017, the town was the administrative center of the former Tamsalu Parish.

== Demographics ==
Ethnic composition 1934-2021
Ethnicity	1934 (Note: Tamsalu was split between Einmani and Nõmküla Parishes, relevant figures have been summed for convenience)		1959		1970		1979		1989		2000		2011		2021	
Ethnicity	amount	%	amount	%	amount	%	amount	%	amount	%	amount	%	amount	%	amount	%
Estonians	468	93.6	1355	86.6	1935	85.8	2056	76.9	2143	72.0	2078	79.5	1850	82.7	1991	82.4
Russians	28	5.60	-	-	172	7.62	356	13.3	523	17.6	320	12.2	264	11.8	303	12.5
Ukrainians	-	-	-	-	23	1.02	55	2.06	125	4.20	-	-	33	1.48	43	1.78
Belarusians	-	-	-	-	8	0.35	41	1.53	38	1.28	-	-	30	1.34	22	0.91
Finns	-	-	-	-	82	3.63	98	3.67	73	2.45	-	-	21	0.94	21	0.87
Jews	-	-	-	-	1	0.04	1	0.04	3	0.10	-	-	0	0.00	0	0.00
Latvians	2	0.40	-	-	7	0.31	10	0.37	2	0.07	-	-	3	0.13	0	0.00
Germans	1	0.20	-	-	-	-	29	1.08	9	0.30	-	-	5	0.22	4	0.17
Tatars	-	-	-	-	-	-	1	0.04	4	0.13	-	-	1	0.04	3	0.12
Poles	-	-	-	-	-	-	6	0.22	4	0.13	-	-	2	0.09	0	0.00
Lithuanians	-	-	-	-	8	0.35	9	0.34	13	0.44	-	-	8	0.36	5	0.21
unknown	1	0.20	0	0.00	0	0.00	0	0.00	0	0.00	8	0.31	1	0.04	5	0.21
other	0	0.00	209	13.4	20	0.89	11	0.41	41	1.38	208	7.96	18	0.81	18	0.75
Total	500	100	1564	100	2256	100	2673	100	2978	100	2614	100	2236	100	2415	100

== Notable people ==
- Marko Pomerants, former Estonian Minister of Social Affairs (April 10, 2003 – April 13, 2005), former Estonian Minister of the Interior (July 3, 2009 – April 5, 2011), former Estonian Minister of the Environment (April 9, 2015 – June 12, 2017), Member of the Estonian Parliament.

== Gallery ==
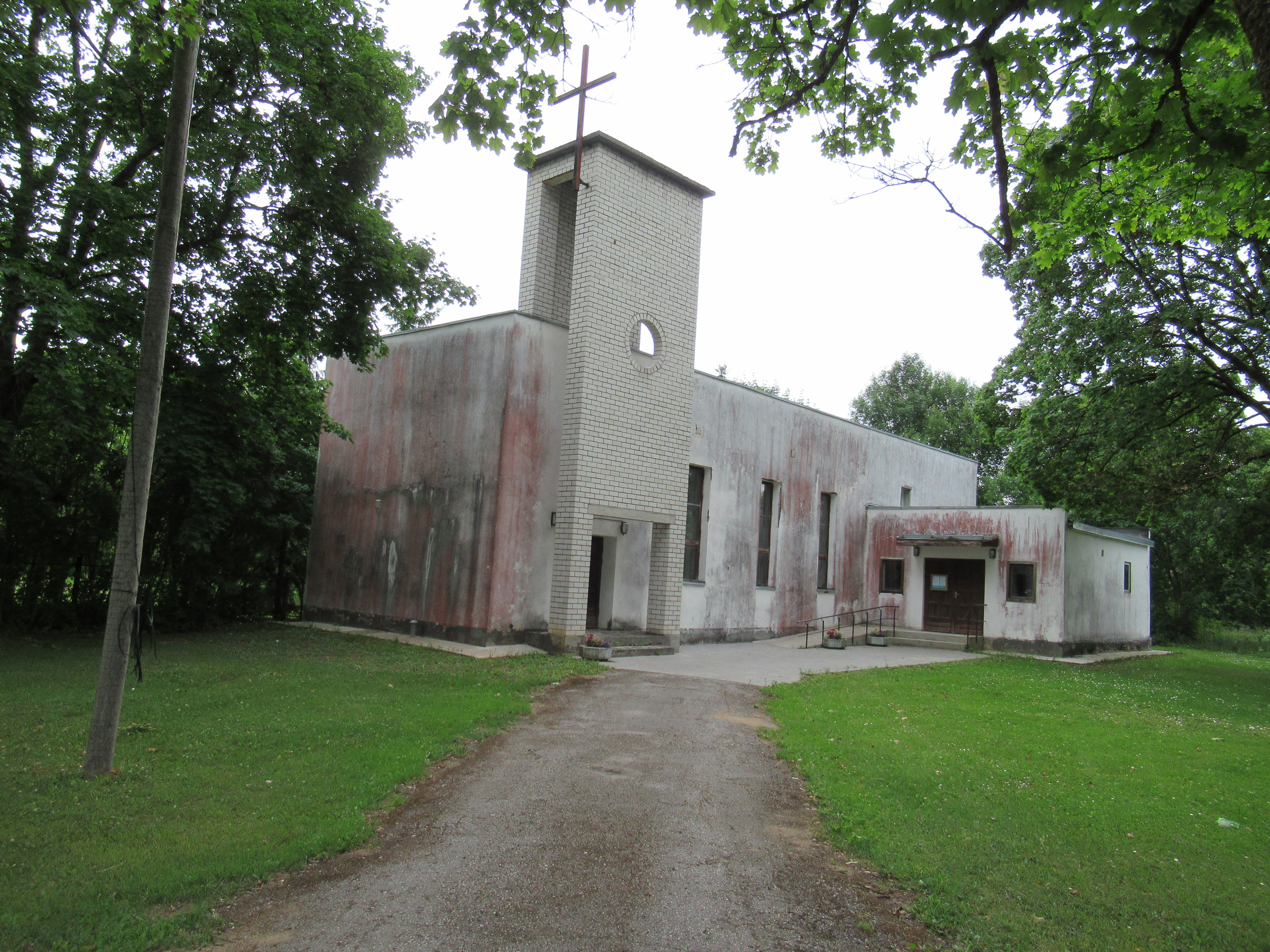
Tamsalu church

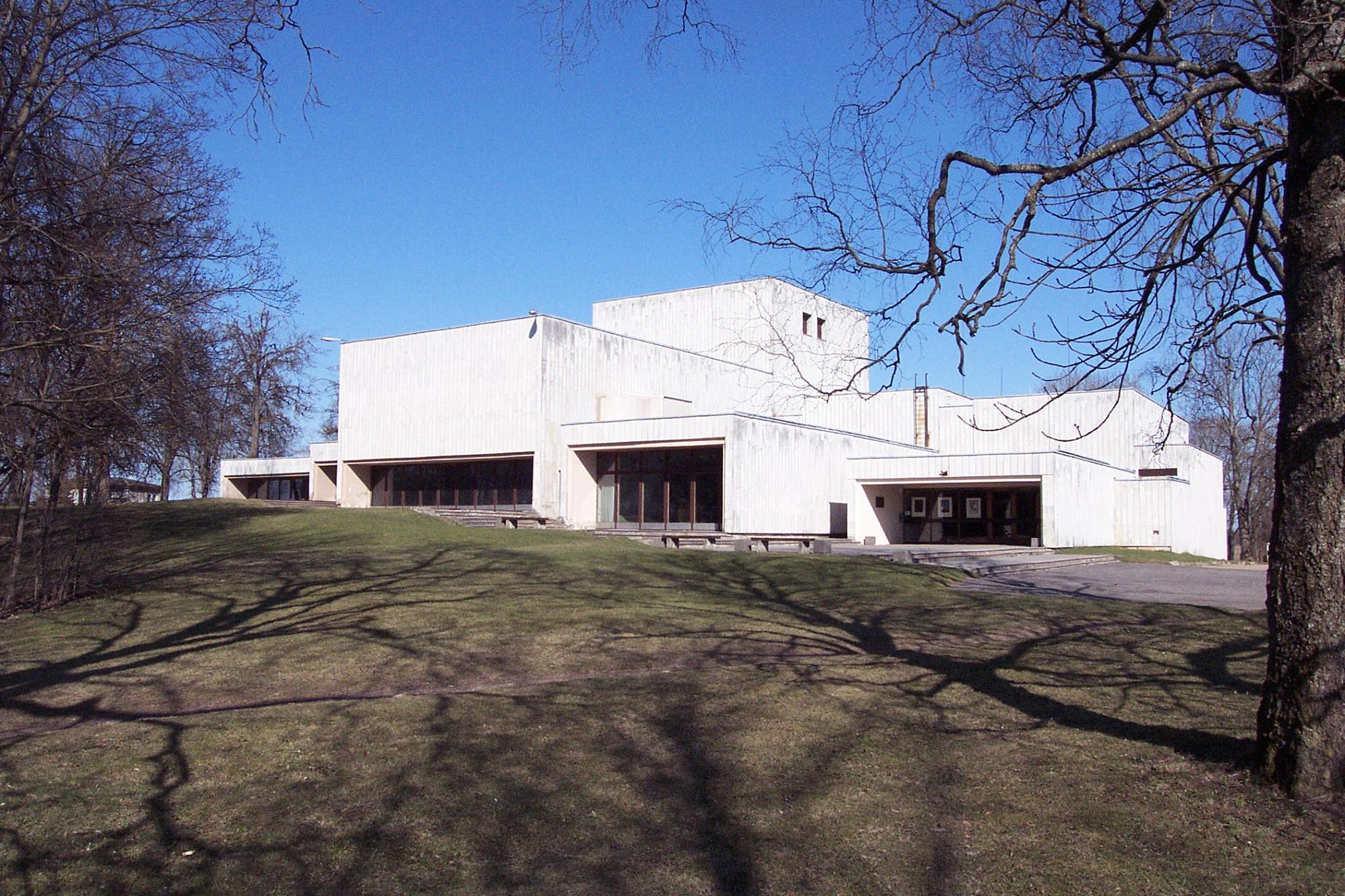
Tamsalu House of Culture

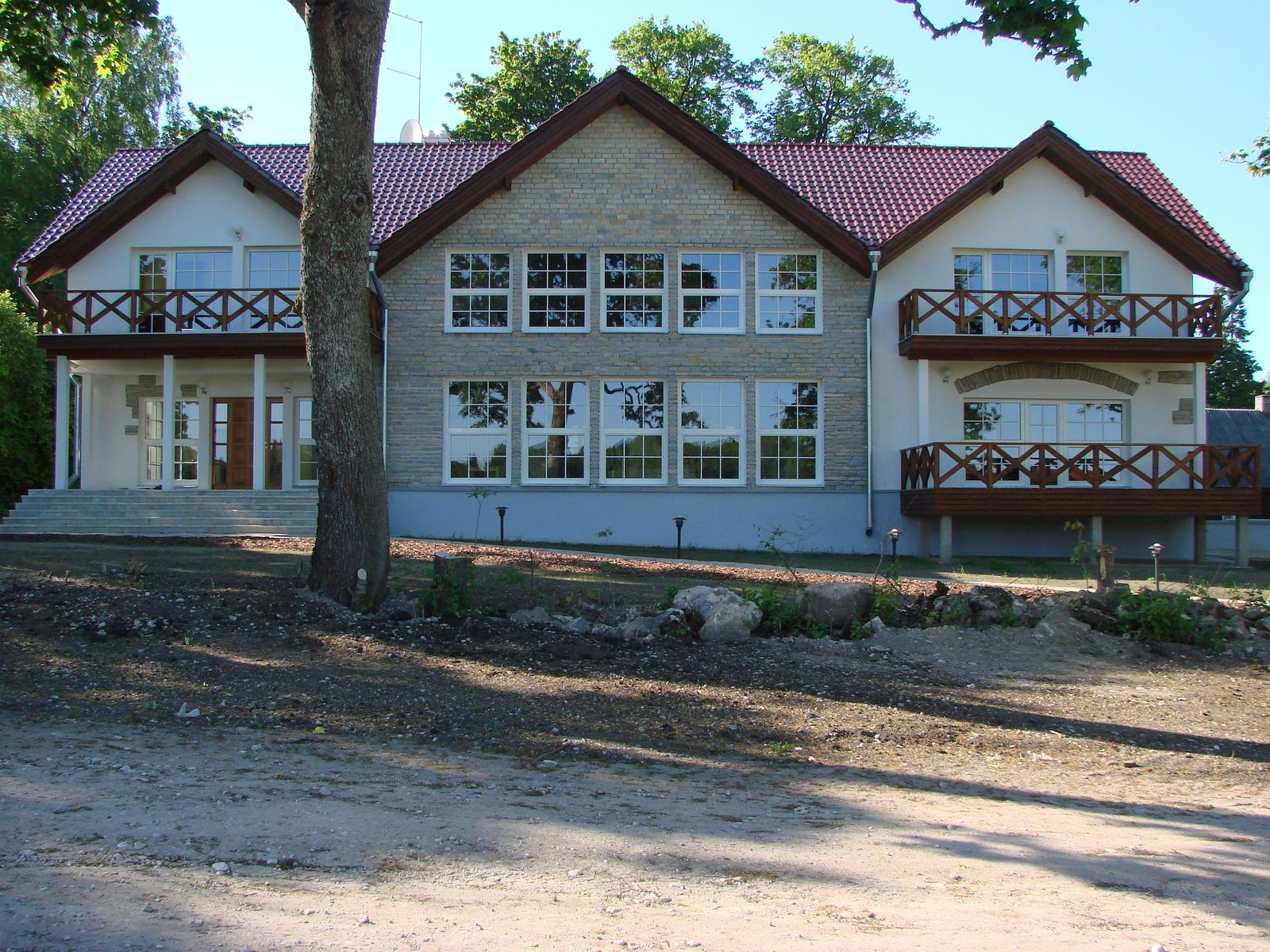

Drone video. Ruins of limestone ring kiln at Tamsalu, Estonia 2021
