= Kuie =

Village in Estonia

Coordinates: 59°06′27″N 26°03′24″E

- Village
- Interactive map of Kuie
- Country: Estonia
- County: Lääne-Viru County
- Parish: Tapa Parish
- Time zone: UTC+2 (EET)
  - Summer (DST): UTC+3 (EEST)

Kuie is a village in Tapa Parish, Lääne-Viru County, in northeastern Estonia.

Wooden Kuie schoolhouse from 1877/1878 was moved to the Estonian Open Air Museum in Tallinn.

== Gallery ==
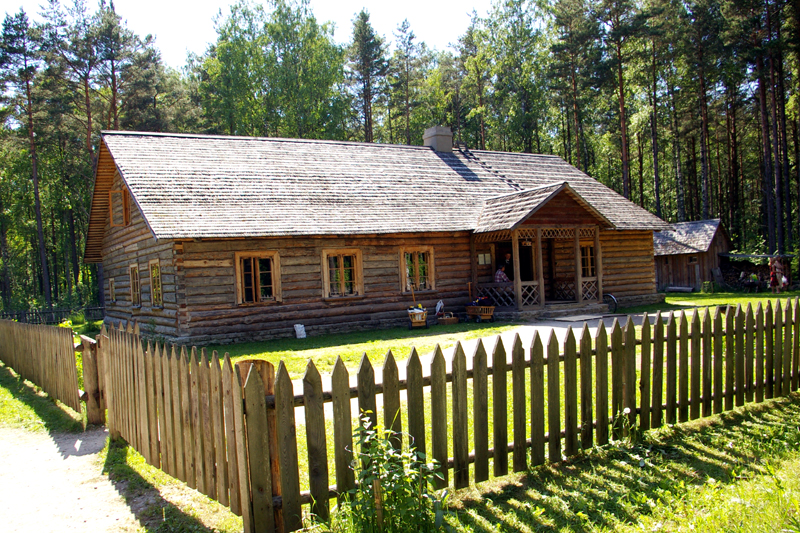
Kuie schoolhouse on its new location in Estonian Open Air Museum
