= Võhmuta =

Village in Estonia

Coordinates: 59°05′N 25°57′E

- Village
- Interactive map of Võhmuta
- Country: Estonia
- County: Lääne-Viru County
- Parish: Tapa Parish

Population (31.12.2011)
  - Total: 45
- Time zone: UTC+2 (EET)
  - Summer (DST): UTC+3 (EEST)

Võhmuta is a village in Tapa Parish, Lääne-Viru County, in northeastern Estonia.

== Gallery ==
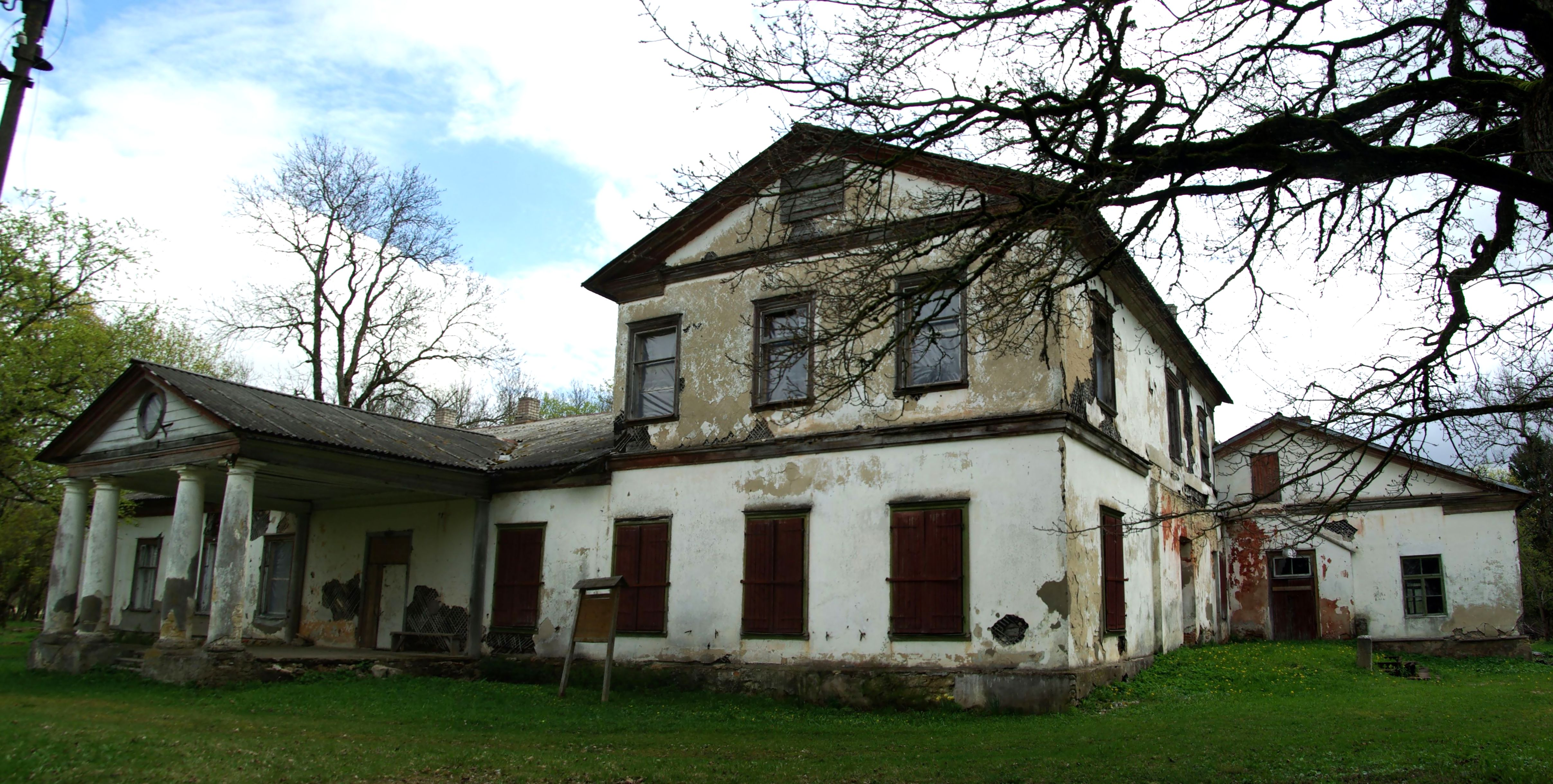
Main building of Võhmuta Manor.

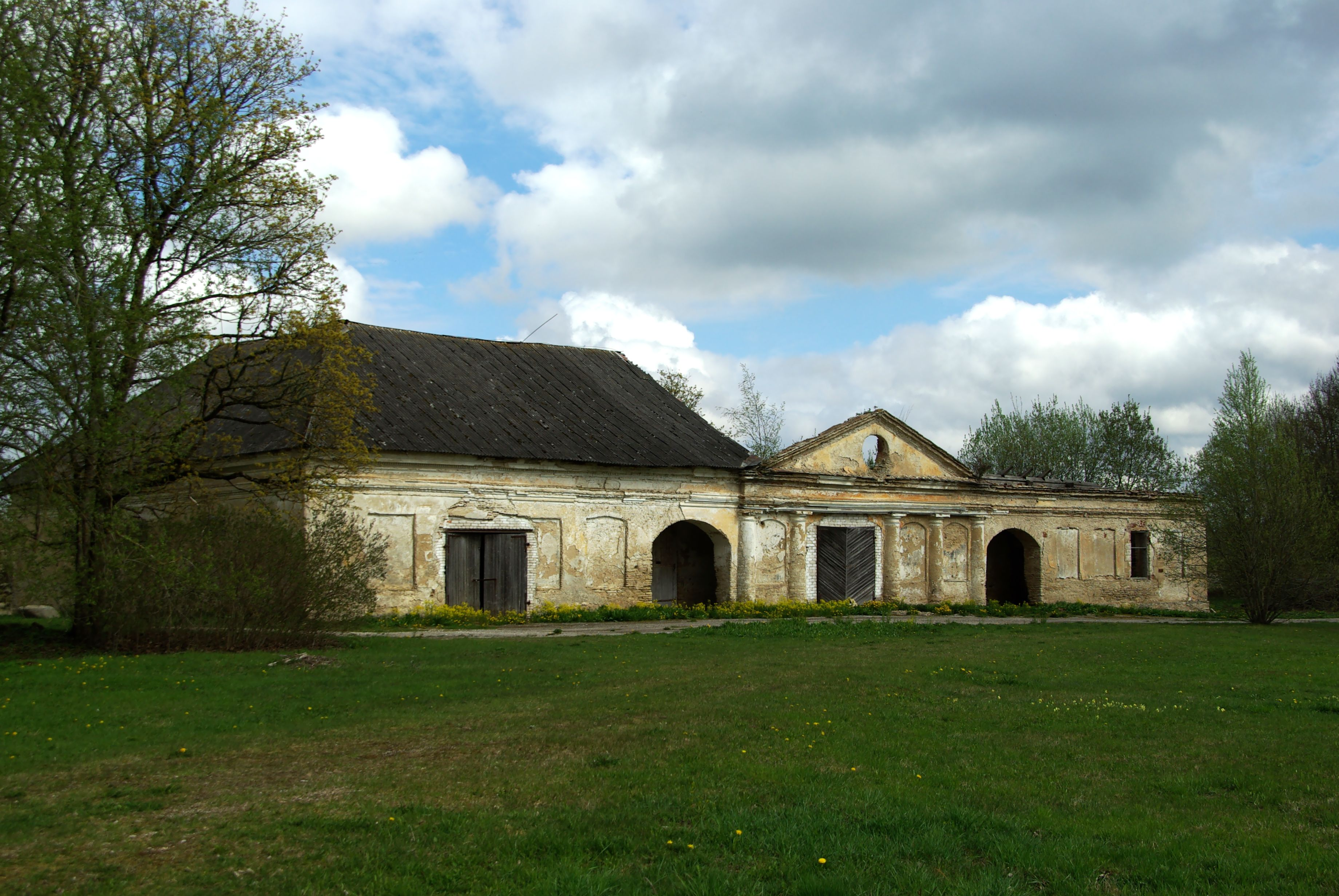
Carriage house of Võhmuta Manor.

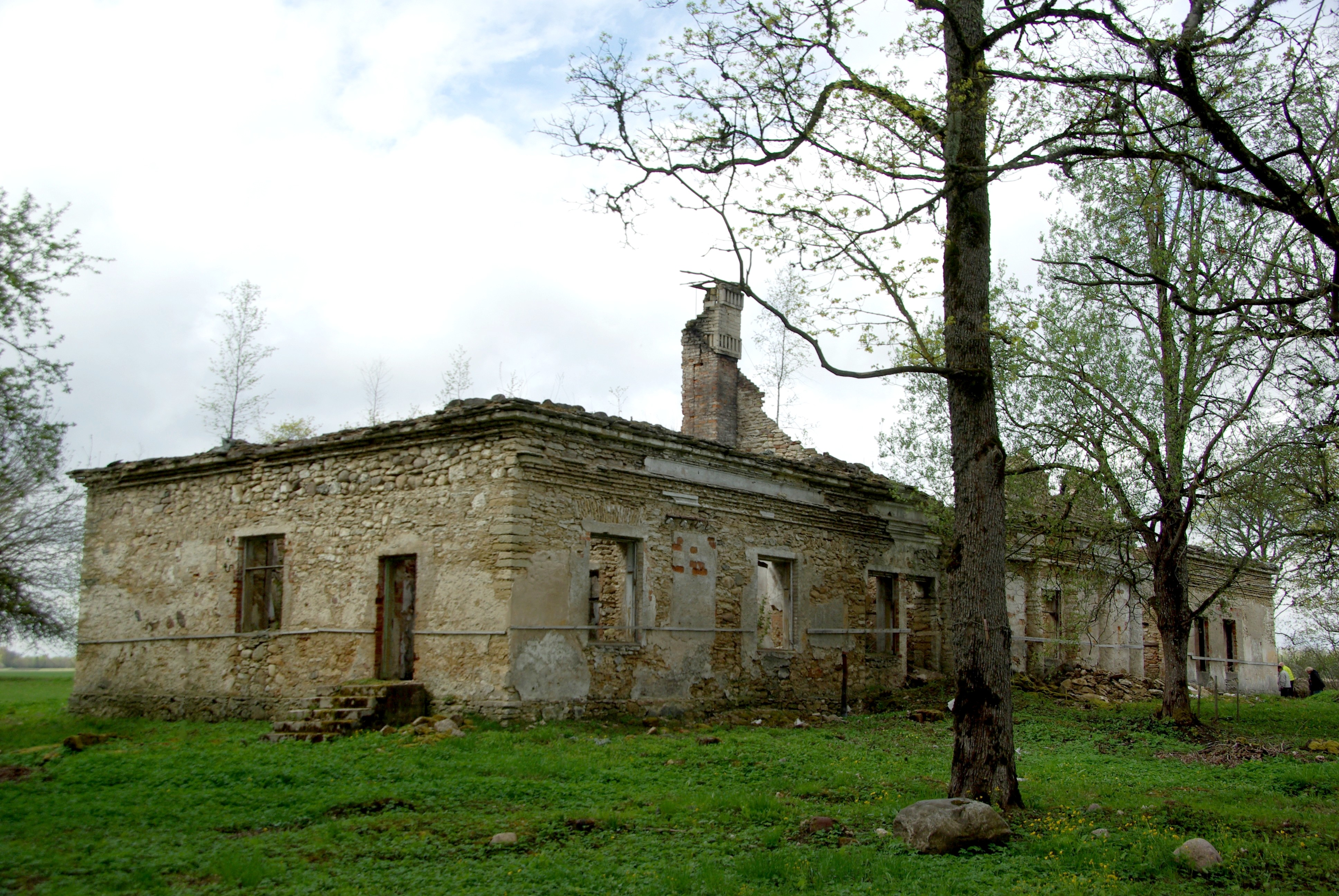
Ruins of the manor's granary.

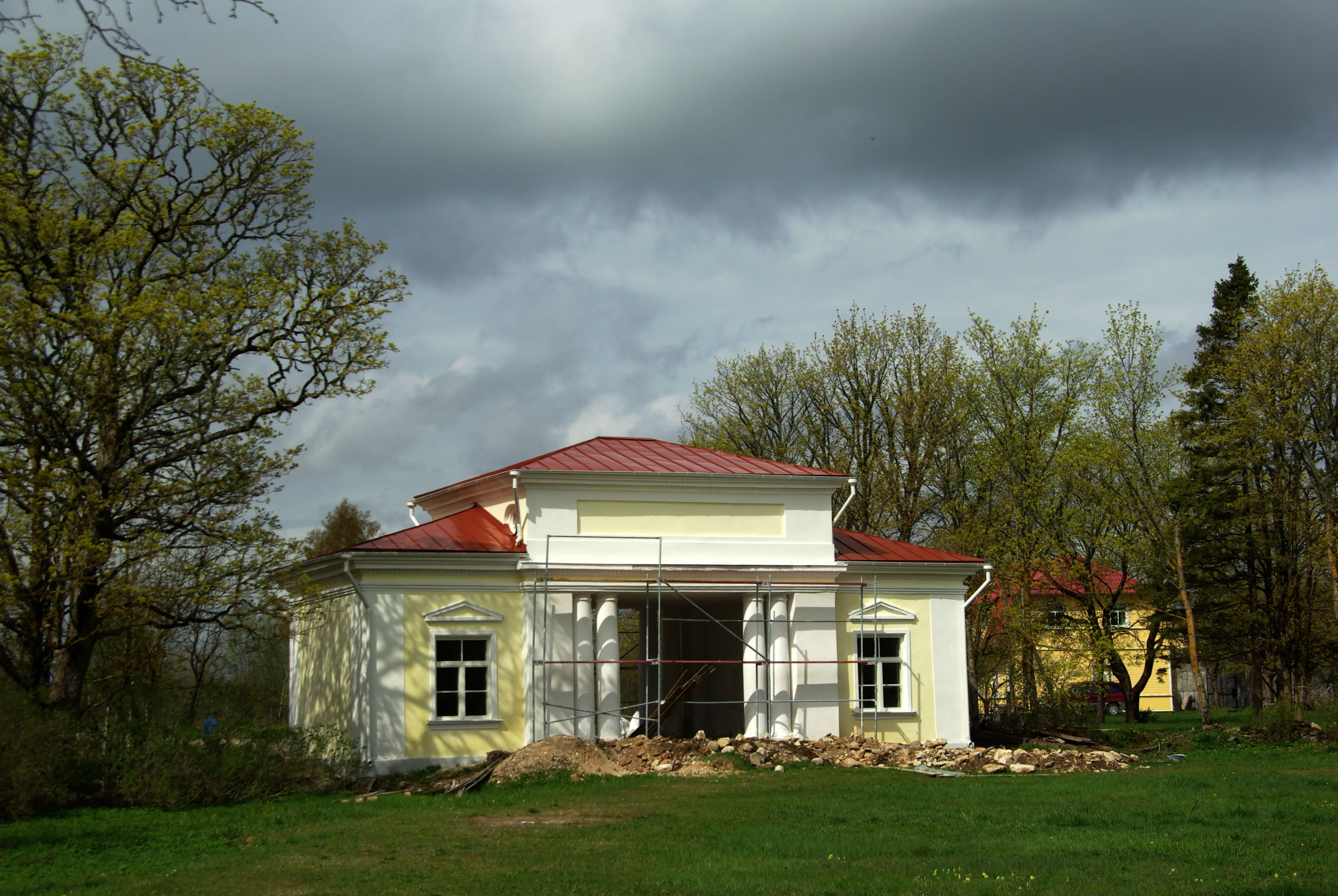
Manor's gate.

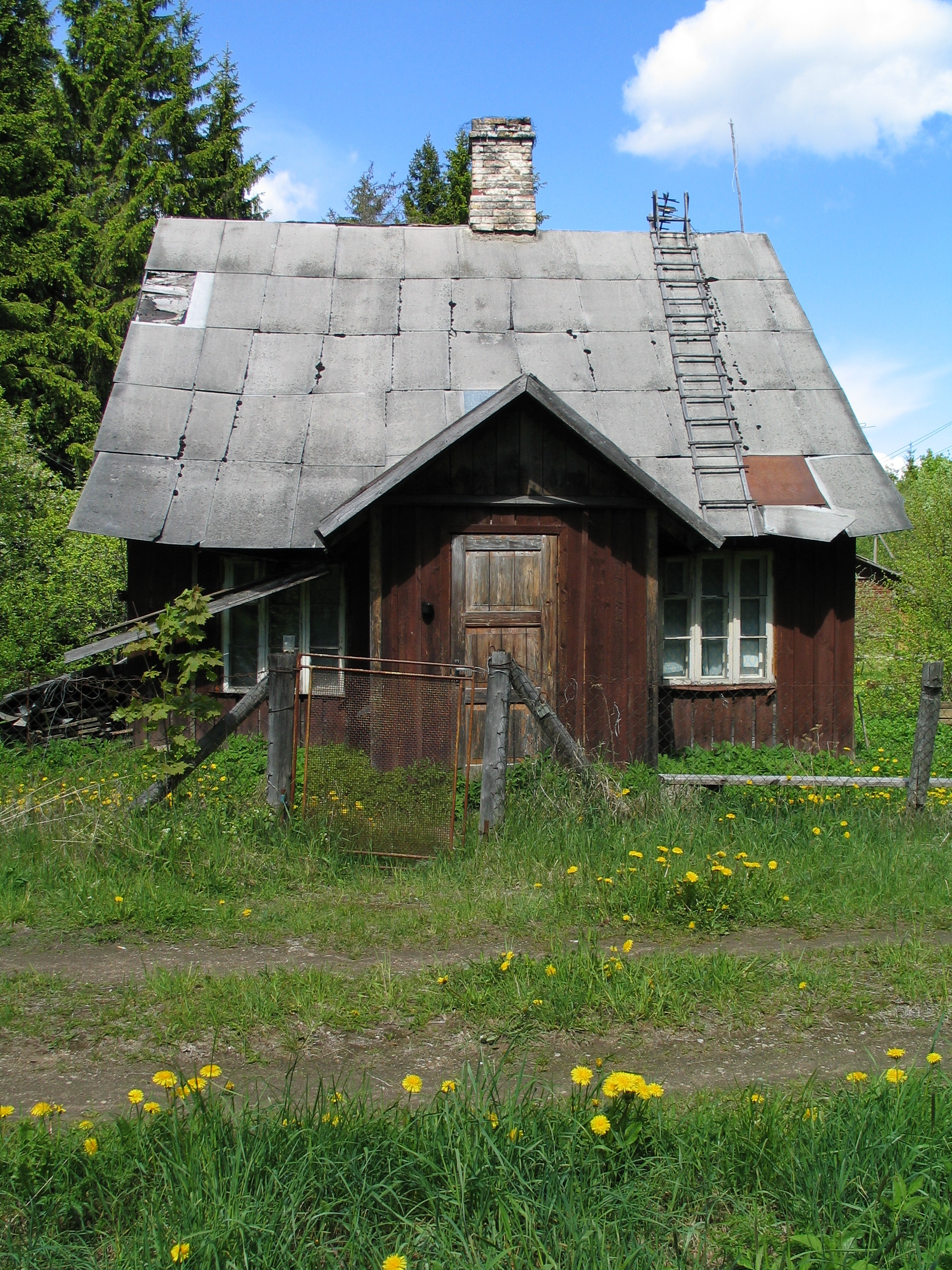
Residential building of Võhmuta railway station's workers.
