= Aavere, Tapa Parish =

Village in Estonia

Aavere
- Village
- Location within Estonia
- Coordinates: 59°05′15″N 26°02′19″E
- Country: Estonia
- County: Lääne-Viru County
- Parish: Tapa Parish
- Time zone: UTC+2 (EET)
  - Summer (DST): UTC+3 (EEST)

Aavere is a village in Tapa Parish, Lääne-Viru County, in northeastern Estonia.
