= Karl Gustav Hippius =

Baltic-German architect who was mostly active in Baku

Karl Gustav Hippius Russian: Карл Густавович Гиппиус
- Born: Karl Otto Gustav Hippius; September 18, 1831; Saint Petersburg, Russian Empire
- Died: September 3, 1880 (aged 48); Saint Petersburg, Russian Empire
- Resting place: Smolensky Cemetery
- Education: Imperial Academy of Arts
- Occupation: Architect
- Children: Karl Karlovich Hippius
- Parent: Gustav Adolf Hippius
- Awards: St. Stanislav Order 3rd degree
- Buildings: Saint Gregory the Illuminator Church; Governor's House (Baku); Nizami Museum of Azerbaijani Literature

Karl Otto Gustav Hippius (Russian: Карл Густавович Гиппиус; 1831 – 1880) was a Baltic German-Russian architect and watercolor artist who shaped the cityscape of Baku and worked extensively throughout the Caucasus region.

== Biography ==
=== Early life and education ===
Hippius was born on September 18 [O.S. September 6] 1831 or later in Saint Petersburg to the son of Baltic German painter and lithographer Gustav Adolf Hippius and Frederike Ignatius, sister of artist Otto Friedrich Ignatius. He also had a brother - architect Otto Pius Hippius. His grandfather was the Evangelical chaplain Thomas Hippius. Karl received early training in all artistic disciplines from his father. He attended Reval Gymnasium for a period from the second semester of 1849 to the first semester of 1850. He studied in St. Petersburg at the Imperial Academy of Arts, graduating in 1855 with the title of non-class artist (Russian: неклассный художник). After graduation, he petitioned the president of the Imperial Academy of Arts "for permission to travel at his own expense for one year to Germany and Italy" to perfect his skills.

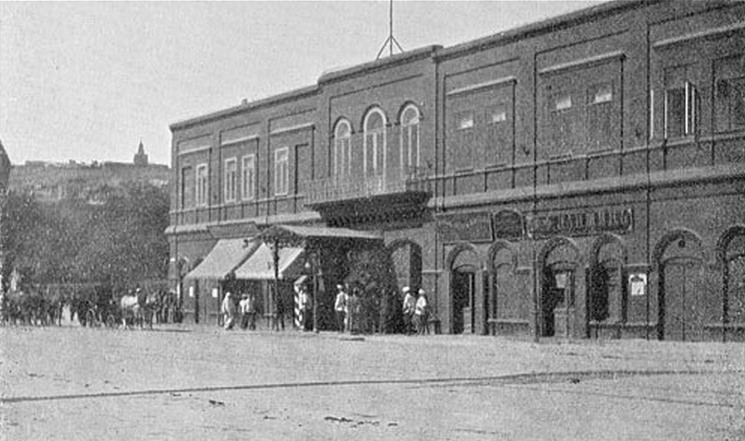
Governor's Residence, 1905

=== Career ===
After his return from traveling, Hippius became an architect and artist for the Transcaspian Trading Company in 1857 and built warehouses in Astarabad (now Gorgan, in northern Iran) and Baku. In 1859, with the rank of Collegiate Registrar, Hippius entered the service of the Main Administration of the Caucasus Viceroyalty. That same year, he investigated the consequences of the earthquake on December 2, 1859, in the gubernatorial capital Shamakhi, which had destroyed many ancient structures. His research provided the basis for transferring the gubernatorial center from Shamakhi to Baku.

While serving in the Main Administration of the Caucasus Viceroyalty, he effectively functioned as the architect under Prince Konstantin Tarkhan-Mouravi, the governor of Baku, performing the duties of city architect before the position was officially created. By order of the Administration of the Caucasus Viceroy dated February 24, 1865, Provincial Secretary Karl Hippius was officially appointed as Baku's city architect effective from February 3, 1865. Notably, this position was created specifically for him and was only officially approved by the Emperor on March 8, 1865.

Hippius significantly influenced Baku's urban development through several major projects. He regulated the street system and squares, constructed the stone embankment, and built the Church of Gregory the Illuminator in 1863-1869. On the embankment, he constructed several significant buildings, including the Governor's Residence in 1865-1867 near Philharmonic Garden (occupied by the governor from 1867), Baron Tornau's house (where the Heydar Aliyev Foundation building now stands), Markarov's house, Ter-Gukasov's house, and three houses for Haji Mirzaguli Gadirov near the Maiden Tower. In 1865, he built the house that housed the Nobility Assembly (now the Nizami Museum of Azerbaijani Literature), as well as many other private residences. Additionally, he created three urban fountains that enhanced the city's infrastructure. One of his notable achievements was preserving the Palace of the Shirvanshahs when there were proposals to convert it into a prison. Later in 1867 (officially in May 1868), Hippius was appointed provincial architect in Yerevan, where he built a prison and a bridge over the Aras River.

For his "excellent-zealous service," on January 6, 1868, at the request of the Viceroy of the Caucasus, Grand Duke Mikhail Nikolayevich, he was awarded the Order of St. Stanislav, 3rd degree.

In 1870, he was nominated for the position of Kherson provincial architect by the Governor-General of Novorossiysk and Bessarabia, but the appointment did not materialize. On October 6, 1871 he was promoted to Titular Counselor for his years of service, with seniority dating from March 1, 1870.

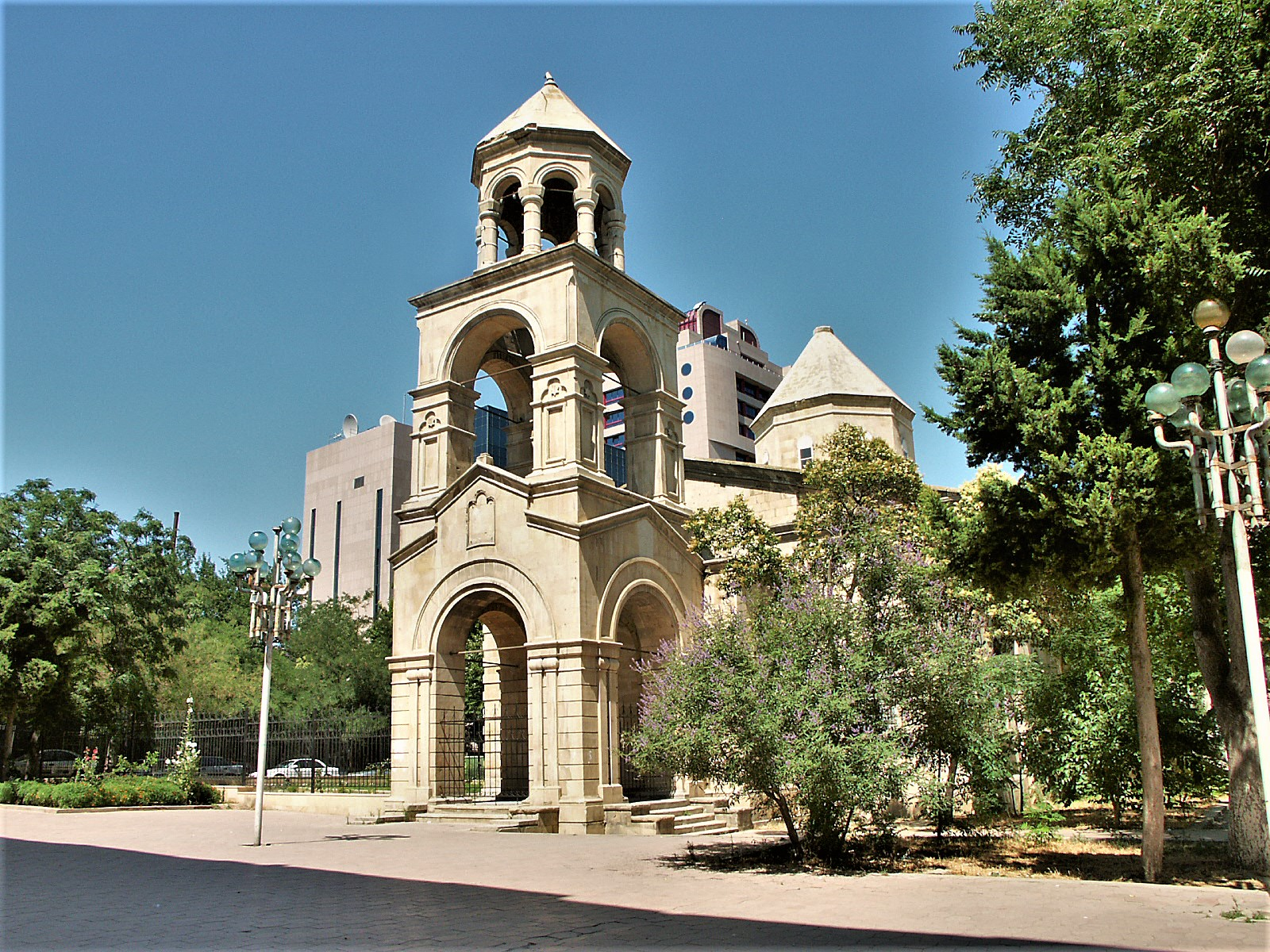
Armenian Church, Baku built in 1863-1869

=== Scientific expeditions ===
In 1860-1861, Hippius accompanied Johannes Albrecht Bernhard Dorn, an orientalist and Active State Councillor, on a scientific expedition to the Caucasus. The expedition was organized by the Imperial Academy of Sciences at the invitation of the Caucasian Department of the Imperial Geographical Society, with the primary goal of "researching the dialects of Iranian origin used there." During this journey, Hippius helped document old inscriptions and created numerous drawings of historical sites and landscapes. These drawings were later used as lithograph illustrations in Dorn's book "Report on a Scientific Journey Through the Caucasus and the Southern Shore of the Caspian Sea." During this expedition, Hippius successfully located the grave of academician Samuel Gottlieb Gmelin in Kayakent.

Hippius was also a member of the Caucasian Department of the Imperial Russian Geographical Society. According to the minutes of the general meeting on November 9, 1861, he was involved in preserving archaeological monuments from the Shirvanshahs period. He undertook the task of creating plans and recording inscriptions from a castle between Shamakhi and Salyan, believed to be the winter residence of the Shirvanshahs, which contained numerous inscriptions from the 13th, 14th, and 15th centuries.

=== Health issues and final years ===
After several years in the Caucasus region, Hippius lost vision in one eye, and the local climate adversely affected his health. He was diagnosed with funicular myelosis (a spinal cord disease). As a result, he resigned from service in 1871 and returned to St. Petersburg for treatment. In St. Petersburg, Hippius took on private building commissions and worked as an architect for the Moscow Fire Insurance Company and the nobility assembly.

Hippius died of a heart attack on September 3 [O.S. August 22] 1880. His funeral was held on August 27, as mentioned in an obituary in the Zodchii journal. According to the Russian Biographical Dictionary, he was buried in St. Petersburg at the Smolensky Cemetery in the Lutheran section. According to funeral notice from the newspaper Novoye Vremya his funeral service was held at St. Anne's Church, and he was buried at the Smolensky Lutheran Cemetery.

== Artistic work ==
In addition to his architectural achievements, Hippius was a watercolorist who constantly painted landscapes and architectural monuments. He did not attach any importance to these works and readily gave them away to his acquaintances. Consequently, many of his artistic works have been lost. An album containing views of Etchmiadzin, which he compiled during his service in Erivan, was preserved by his widow.

== Family ==
He was married to Anna Stepanovna Sviridova (1 November 1840 – 8 March 1905), daughter of an Orthodox priest in Caucasus. They had a son, Karl Karlovich Hippius, who was also an architect.
