= Victor Ewald =

Russian composer (1860–1935)

Victor Vladimirovich Ewald
- Виктор Владимирович Эвальд
- Born: November 27, 1860; Saint Petersburg, Russian Empire (present-day Russia)
- Died: April 16, 1935 (aged 74); Leningrad, Russian SFSR, Soviet Union (present-day Saint Petersburg, Russia)
- Occupations: Engineer, architect, composer

Victor Vladimirovich Ewald (Note: Russian: Виктор Владимирович Эвальд, romanized: Viktor Vladimirovich Evald) (27 November 1860 – 16 April 1935), was a Russian engineer, architect, and composer of music, mainly for conical brass instruments.

== Biography ==
Victor Ewald was born in Saint Petersburg and died in Leningrad. Ewald was a professor of Civil Engineering in St. Petersburg, and was also the cellist with the Beliaeff Quartet for sixteen years. This quartet was the most influential ensemble in St. Petersburg in the late 19th century, introducing much of the standard quartet literature to Russian concertgoers. He also collected and published Russian folk songs much like other composers of his time.

Ewald’s professional life, like that of many of his musical contemporaries, was in an entirely different field; that of a civil engineer. He excelled in this field, being appointed in 1900 as professor and manager of the Faculty of Construction Materials at the St. Petersburg Institute of Civil Engineers. From 1910 to 1924, Ewald served as editor of the architectural journal Zodchii. From 1922 to 1932, he chaired the Petrograd Society of Architects. An obituary signed by his fellow professors of the I.C.E. makes mention of a profound heritage in the development of materials production for construction resulting from Ewald’s work, and suggests that “…an entire industry for the production of brick and cement manufacturing is beholden to him”. Brass players however, are indebted to him for something very different – a series of quintets which have become a staple of the repertoire and which represent almost the only, and certainly the most extended examples of original literature in the Romantic style.

Ewald’s formal musical training began in 1872 when he enrolled at the St Petersburg Conservatory at the age of twelve. Founded in 1861 by Anton Rubinstein, this institution was the first of its kind in Russia and it was here that Ewald received lessons in cornet, piano, horn, cello, harmony and composition.

Ewald’s cello teacher Karl Davydov encouraged him to immerse himself in practical music making of any sort whenever the opportunity arose. Ewald soon became one of the most active members of a circle of dilettante musicians. This group had a shared interest in indigenous folksong and contributed to the development of a Russian national musical style which, for the majority of the 19th century had been almost entirely submerged by the Germanic tradition in both teaching and practice.

Amongst this circle was a group who became known as The Mighty Handful, consisting of Mily Balakirev (railroad clerk), Alexander Borodin (chemist), César Cui (soldier and engineer), Modest Mussorgsky (Imperial Guard Officer) and Nicolai Rimsky-Korsakov (navy officer). The musical focal point for Ewald and the Mighty Five, as well as others, was provided by what became known as the ‘Friday Evenings’ - weekly soirées for amateur performers and composers at the house of Mitrofan Petrovich Belaïev (timber merchant), which were initiated in 1888 and continued unbroken until his death in 1904.

Belaïev’s importance in the development of the musical life of Ewald and all the other Friday Evening participants was considerable and went far beyond merely providing a venue for their activities. After the death of his father in 1885, Belaïev set about encouraging the development of new music in a number of practical ways, such as: the founding of a publishing house (Edition M.P. Belaïeff); the promotion of orchestral concerts; and the aforementioned Friday Evenings. It was at these evenings that one of the regular performing ensembles was a string quartet in which Belaïev played the viola and Ewald the cello. As well as providing opportunities for music making, these gatherings allowed Belaïev to audition potential publications and it is almost certain that it was for performance by, and amongst his friends and musical contemporaries, that Ewald’s four quintets were written.

== Brass quintets ==
For many years Ewald’s four quintets (written 1888–1912) were considered to be the first original pieces composed specifically for an ensemble which is recognisable today as essentially the modern brass quintet - consisting of two treble, valved instruments, one alto, one tenor and one bass.

The French composer Jean-François Bellon wrote 12 four-movement brass quintets published in 1848-50, showing that Ewald was not the first composer to write for this combination. However, the popularity of Ewald's quintets has in no way diminished because of this.

Both Bellon and Ewald wrote music that displayed the increased virtuosity and homogeneity possible as a result of developments in brass instrument design and manufacture in the second half of the 19th century. Inevitably, at such a time of change and invention, there would be some variation in the exact design of instruments in favour from country to country and so the actual constituent parts of Ewald’s quintet would have differed in some ways from those instruments played in Bellon’s quintet and certainly in current times, by such as Canadian Brass.

Photographic evidence from about 1912 shows that Ewald himself played in a brass quintet. It is seen to consist of two piston-valved cornets, rather than the modern choice of trumpets; a rotary-valved alto or tenor horn (nomenclature depends on region), rather than the French horn; a rotary-valved baritone horn, rather than the trombone; and a rotary-valved tuba (played by Ewald himself). Of these instruments, it is the alto and tenor horns that are most strikingly different from their modern quintet counterparts. There is no documented evidence of exactly for whom Ewald composed his quintets, or the exact instruments on which he envisaged them being performed. Therefore, one can only speculate that, for instance, cornets might have been preferred to trumpets, because of the latter’s association with the more strident demands made of it in symphonic settings, rather than the intimacy of a chamber setting for which the former was perhaps more suited. Similarly, the likely preference of a tenor horn (similar to today’s euphonium and an instrument occasionally transposed as a soloist to the symphony orchestra, as in the first movement of Mahler's 7th Symphony), may have been the result of a wish on Ewald’s part to maintain the virtuosic potential, as well as tonal characteristics throughout his ensemble by sticking entirely to valved, conical-bored instruments. Certainly this suggestion is one that might find favour with modern-day trombonists required to rise to the challenge of what can only be described as, at times, unidiomatic writing. And of course one cannot reject the theory that it was simple pragmatism of utilizing instruments and performers close at hand.

For many years it was wrongly thought that Ewald was the composer of only one quintet, his Op. 5 in B♭ minor, because this was the only one published (by Edition Belaïeff in 1912) during his lifetime. The discovery of the other three works was due to the research of André M. Smith (a musicologist and former bass trombonist at the Metropolitan Opera, New York), who was given the manuscripts by Ewald’s son-in-law, Yevgeny Gippius in 1964. A further nine years of investigation was necessary to authenticate the manuscripts, before the pieces were given their first modern performance during the 1974-75 season in a series of concerts by the American Brass Quintet at Carnegie Hall. Recently, Canadian Brass published critical editions all of the Victor Ewald quintets edited by Tony Rickard, taking into account, and benefiting from, all recent scholarship surrounding these works.

A very approximate chronology of the composition of the four quintets runs as follows:

Quintet no. 4 in A♭ major (Op. 8) - c. 1888
Quintet no. 1 in B♭ minor (Op. 5) - c. 1890
Quintet no. 2 in E♭ major (Op. 6) - c. 1905
Quintet no. 3 in D♭ major (Op. 7) - c. 1912

The apparent confusion between the numbering and approximate date of composition of the quintets arises from another long-held misconception, also corrected by the studies of Mr. Smith. For some time it was considered that Quintet no. 4 (Op. 8) was merely a transcription by the composer of a string quartet written in the late 1880s and not an original composition for brass. However, Op. 8 was indeed initially written for brass but was considered to be unplayable at the time due to the demands of both technique and stamina made on the performers. Ewald duly reworked the piece for string quartet and it was in this form that it was published as his Op. 1.

== Canadian Brass edition ==
The Canadian Brass editions (edited by Tony Rickard) do not set out to provide an Urtext edition, but rather to give performers a consistent and practical set of material for concert use. The edition therefore follows the instrumentation conventions of the modern brass quintet, in that it is scored for two trumpets (in B♭), French horn (in F), trombone and tuba. Because of the aforementioned taxing nature of the piece, an alternative E♭ part is provided for the 1st trumpet in Op. 8.

Suggested metronome markings have been added based on the accumulated evidence of several recordings (including those by Stockholm Chamber Brass, Canadian Brass, the Wallace Collection and the Philip Jones Brass Ensemble) as well as the editor’s own preferences. They are in no way included as a definitive statement, but rather in the hope that they may be of assistance to musicians discovering these pieces for the first time. There exists another 1977 edition by Sto-Art publishing edited by the Empire Brass, who championed Ewald's works.

== Major works ==
- Brass Quintet No. 1 in B♭ min, Op. 5 (c. 1890, rev. 1912)
  - I: Moderato
  - II: Adagio - Allegro - Adagio
  - III: Allegro Moderato
- Brass Quintet No. 2, Op. 6 in E♭ major
  - I: Allegro Risoluto
  - II: Tema Con Variozioni
  - III: Allegro Vivace
- Brass Quintet No. 3 in D♭ Maj, Op. 7 or 11
  - I: Allegro Moderato
  - II: Intermezzo
  - III: Andante
  - IV: Vivo
- Brass Quintet No. 4, Op. 8
  - I: Allegro Commodo
  - II: Allegro
  - III: Andantino
  - IV: Allegro Con Brio

== Discography ==
- New York Philharmonic Brass Ensemble, Quintet No.1 (as Symphony for Brass), LP Golden Crest Records CR 4003 (1960)
- Chicago Symphony Brass Quintet, Quintet No. 1, 2006 release of a live 1966 recording, Summit Records DCD 469 (2006)
- American Brass Quintet, Quintet No. 1, Music for Brass (1500 - 1970), Desto Records DC 6474 – 6477 (1969),
- Illinois Brass Quintet, Quintet No. 1, The Illinois Brass Quintet, Music Minus One (1969)
- Philip Jones Brass Ensemble, Quintet No. 1, originally released on Just Brass, LP Argo Records ZRG 655 (1970), rereleased on CD Philip Jones Brass Ensemble Greatest Hits, Decca 289 467 746-2
- Das Deutsche Blechbläserquintett (German Brass), Quintet No. 1 (arranged for sextet), German Brass, Audite 95.401 (1977)
- Empire Brass Quintet, Quintets No. 1, 2, 3, Russian Brass, LP Sine Qua Non Superba SQN-SA 2012 (1977)
- Mount Royal Brass Quintet, Quintet No. 1, LP McGill University Records 77004 (1978)
- Tidewater Brass Quintet, Quintet No. 1, LP Golden Crest Records CRSQ 4174 (1978)
- Floreat Brass Quintet, Quintet No. 1, Quintette de Cuivres Floreat Musica, LP Indesens (1979)
- New York Brass Quintet, Quintets No. 2 and 3, Romantic Age Brass, Mentor Men-108 (1981 and 1984)
- Swedish Brass Quintet, Quintet No. 3, Music for Brass Ensemble, BIS BIS-CD-248 (1984)
- American Brass Quintet, Quintet No. 1, Brass Music of St. Petersburg, LP Musical Heritage Society MHS 7557L (1985)
- Farnaby Brass Ensemble, Quintet No. 1 (1986)
- The Brass Ring, Quintet No. 1, Crystal CD561 (1988)
- Munich Brass, Quintet No. 2, Munich Brass, Orfeo C 166 881 A (1988)
- Quintette Magnifica, Quintet No. 1, (1989)
- Atlantic Brass Quintet, Quintet No. 3, Summit DCD 119 (1990)
- Ensemble de Cuivres des Hauts de France, Quintet No. 1, Musique de Chambre à Saint Petersbourg, BNL Productions BNL 112861 (1993)
- Das Rennquintett, Quintet No. 1, 5 Klassiker!, Bayer Records (Austria) BR 100 251 CD (1994)
- Blechbläserensemble Ludwig Güttler, Quintet No. 1, Musik für Bläser, Berlin Classics BC 1090-2 (1994)
- Stockholm Chamber Brass, Quintets No. 1, 2, 3, 4, Sounds of St. Petersburg, BIS BIS-CD-613 (1994)
- Ensemble Epsilon, Quintet No. 1, Epsilon, Chamade CHCD 5610 (1994)
- Center City Brass Quintet, Quintet No. 1, Chandos 10017 (1996)
- Mannheim Brass Quintet, Quintet No. 2, Brass Pieces, Audite 97.458 (1998)
- The Wallace Collection, Quintets No. 1, 2, 3, Baltic Brass, Deux-Elles DXL 1042 (2001)
- Center City Brass Quintet, Quintet No. 3, Romantic Music for Brass, Chandos CHSA 5023 (2004)
- Mardi Brass, Quintet No. 2, Something Old... The Evolution of the Brass Quintet, London Independent Records LIR010 (2005)
- Philadelphia Orchestra Brass, Quintets No. 1 and 3, Ondine ODE-1150 (2010)
- Wien-Berlin Brass Quintett, Quintet No. 1, Tudor 7201 (2015)
- The Prince Regent's Band, Quintets No. 1 and 2, Russian Revolutionaries, Resonus Classics RES 10201 (2017)
- Buzz Cuivrés (Buzz Brass), Quintet No. 1, Héritage, ATMA Classique ACD22897 (2024)

== Bibliography ==
- Smith, Andre M.: "Brass in Early Russia: From the Beginnings to the Birth of Victor Ewald, 1860." ITG Journal 18, no.2 (December 1993): pp. 4–20.
- Smith, Andre M.: "Victor Vladimirovich Ewald (1860 - 1935), Civil Engineer & Musician". ITG Journal 18, no.3 (February 1994): pp. 4–23.
- Smith, Andre M.:"The History of the Four Quintets for Brass by Victor Ewald." ITG Journal 18, no.4 (May 1994): pp. 5–33.
