= August Georg Wilhelm Pezold =

Baltic German painter (1794–1859)

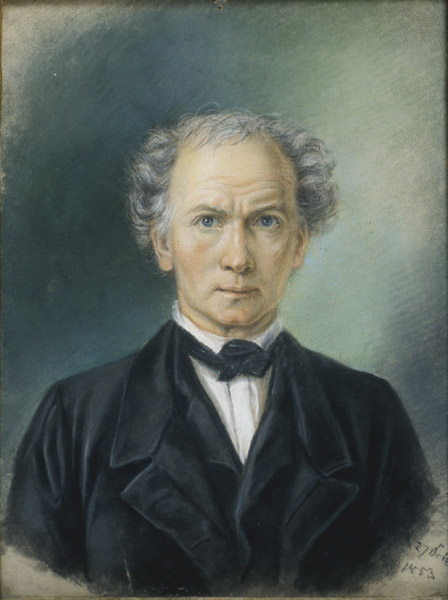
Self-Portrait, 1855, pastel; Estonian Art Museum, Tallinn

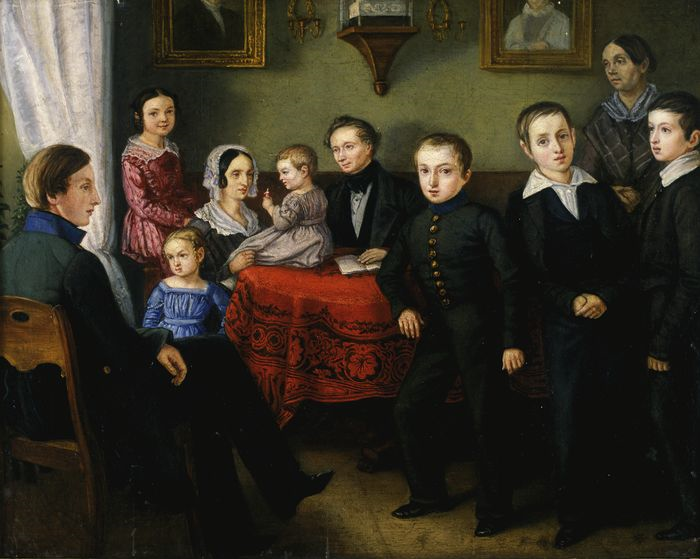
Portrait of the Doeppi Family (1845)

August Georg Wilhelm Pezold (9 August 1794 in Rakvere, Governorate of Estonia, Russian Empire – 12 March 1859 in Saint Petersburg) was a Baltic German painter and lithographer.

== Biography ==
Pezold's father was a doctor. Both of his parents died while he was still a child and he was raised by the Rehbinder family (former patients of his father) at their estate in Udriku, Estonia. He then attended the "Domschule" (Cathedral School) in Tallinn.

From 1812 to 1814, he followed in his father's footsteps; studying medicine at the Imperial University of Dorpat (Tartu). After that, he devoted himself to art and accompanied his friend, Otto Friedrich Ignatius, to Berlin, where they enrolled at the Academy of Arts.

From 1815 to 1816, he studied at the Academy of Fine Arts Vienna. After a year, he, Ignatius and Gustav Adolf Hippius spent two years travelling in Italy, then a year in Switzerland. After detours to Paris and London, he returned to Estonia in 1821.

Pezold worked primarily as a portrait painter, both there and in Livonia, primarily Riga. From 1824 to 1830, he was a drawing teacher at the Smolny Institute in Saint Petersburg. He later travelled throughout central Europe and Finland but had to return home in 1837 due to the accidental deaths of two of his sons and his wife's subsequent illness. He was named a "free-artist" by the University of Saint Petersburg in 1839.

In 1842, he became one of the founders of the Estonian Literary Society and began teaching at the University in Saint Petersburg. In 1854, he was appointed a member of the Imperial Academy of Arts.

In addition to his portraits and some landscapes, he painted scenes of rural life and the peasantry in what later would be called the Naïve style. He has also been referred to as a practitioner of Estonian Biedermeier.
