= Alexander's Cathedral =

Church building in Narva, Estonia

Alexander church
- Narva Alexander church
- Aleksandri kirik
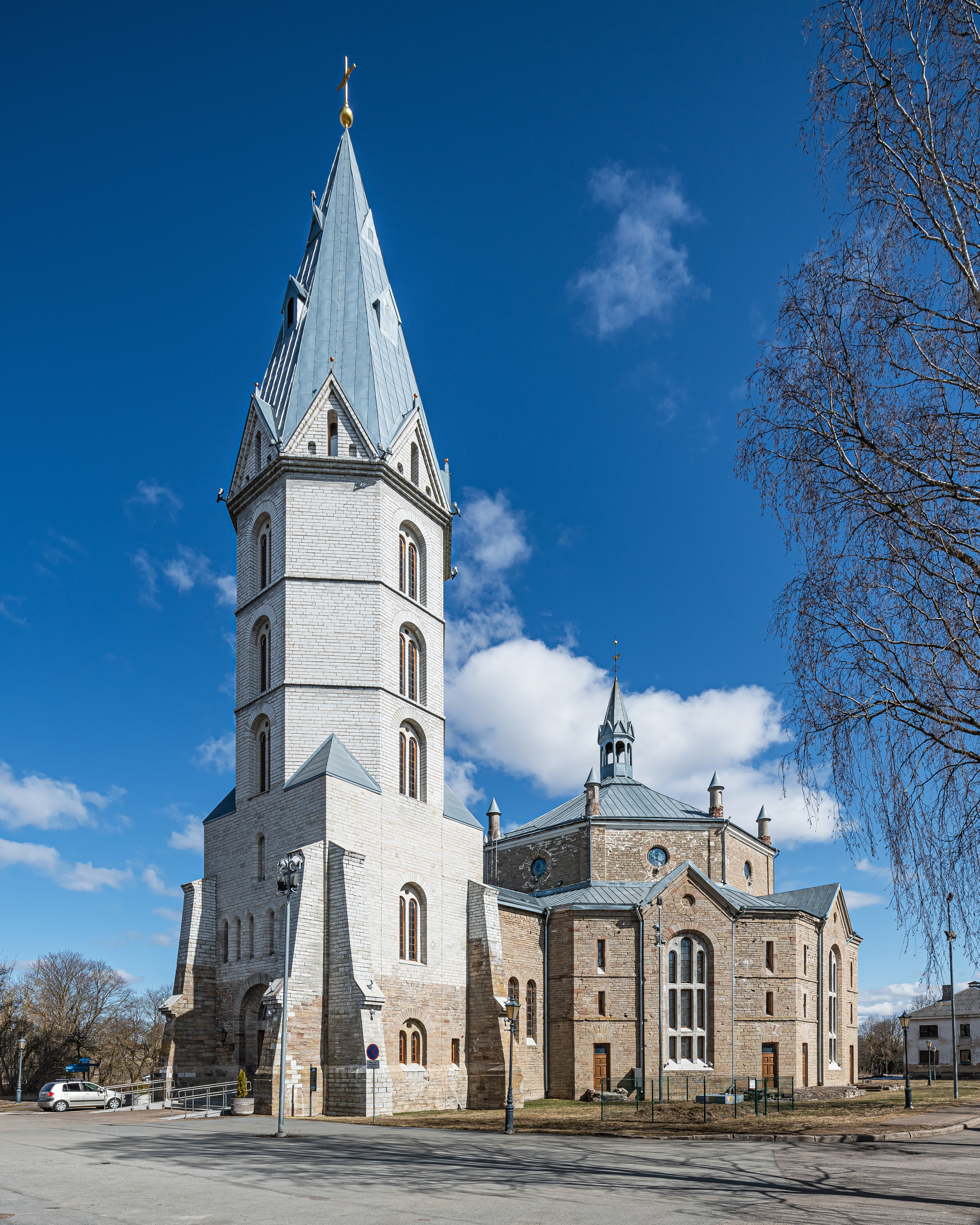
- Alexander church
- 59.3708°N 28.2017°E
- Address: Kiriku street 9, Narva
- Denomination: Lutheran

History
- Consecrated: 9.June/28.May(Julian cal.) 1884

Architecture
- Architect: Otto Pius Hippius
- Style: Historicism
- Years built: 1881-1884
- Construction cost: 184,000 rubles

Specifications
- Height: Tower: 60.75m, Hall: 25.5m

Alexander's Church (Estonian: Aleksandri Suurkirik) is a church of the Estonian Evangelical Lutheran Church in Narva, Estonia. Narva Church's original cornerstone was laid in summer 1881. It was congregated after Emperor Alexander II death in 1883, after his assassination earlier in spring. The church was consecrated on 9 June 1884. It was given cathedral status by President Lennart Meri on 19 September 2000.

St. Alexander’s congregation of Narva went bankrupt in 2015 due to the congregation’s inability to meet financial obligations related to the reconstruction of the church tower. The cathedral building was to be auctioned, but after several requests, the auction was called off and the building was purchased by the Estonian Government and the Estonian Evangelical Lutheran Church for 375,000 euros.
