= Charles's Church, Tallinn =

Church building in Tallinn, Estonia

Coordinates: 59°25′54″N 24°44′20″E

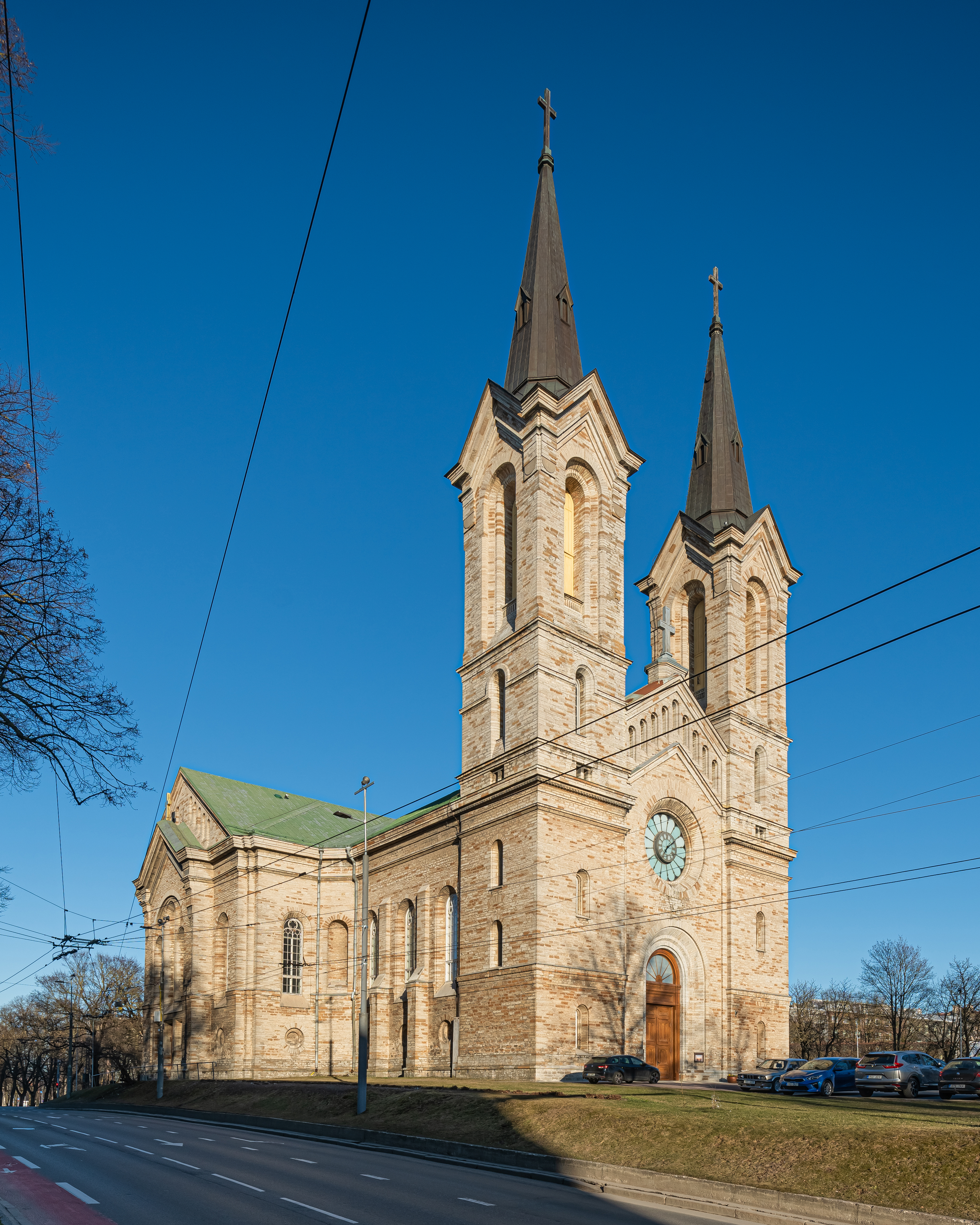
Exterior of the church

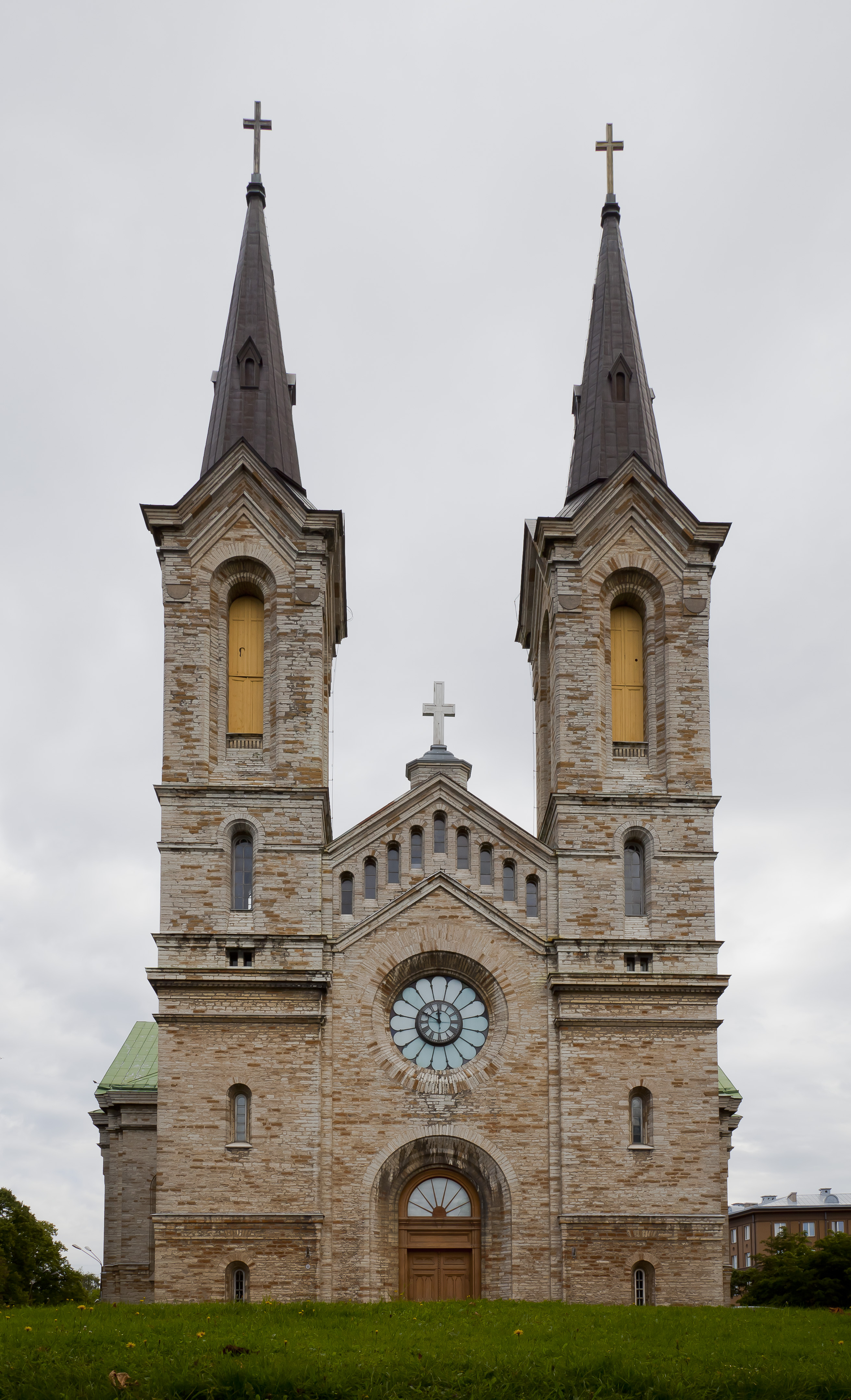
West façade

Charles's Church (Estonian: Kaarli kirik) is a Lutheran church in Tallinn, Estonia, built 1862–1870 to plans by Otto Pius Hippius. It is Tallinn's grandest 19th-century church.

Tõnismägi hill has been the location of a chapel probably since the 14th century. In 1670, during the time of Swedish rule, the Swedish King Charles XI commissioned the construction of a church on the site, for the use of the Estonian and Finnish population of Tallinn (as opposed to the Baltic German population). The church was named after the king. In 1710, during the Great Northern War, this first wooden church was burnt down.

In the 19th century, reconstruction plans were put forward. Donations of money were started in the 1850s, and the cornerstone of the new church was laid in 1862. The church, still incomplete, was inaugurated in 1870. The two towers on the west side were enlarged in 1882.

The church is designed in the tradition of Western European cathedrals, with two western towers flanking a rose window, and built in a Romanesque Revival style. The church has a Latin cross plan, and is in effect a hall church, the ceiling being held aloft without the use of pillars (according to a solution thought out by Hippius in collaboration with Rudolf von Bernhardt). The apse is decorated by a fresco by Johann Köler, the first fresco in Estonia made by an ethnic Estonian. The church still houses the bells of the original, wooden church, cast in Stockholm in 1696.
