= Muuga, Lääne-Viru County =

Village in Estonia

Muuga
- Village
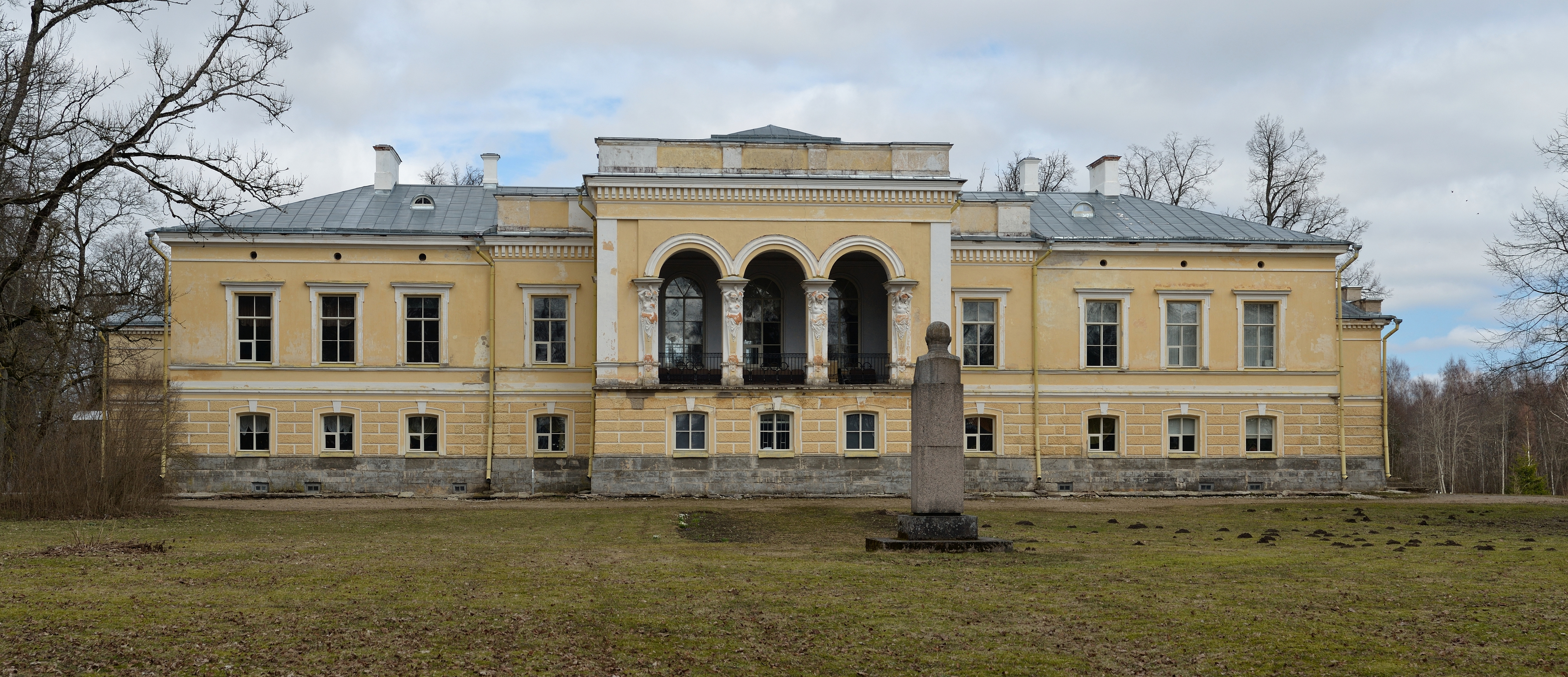
- Muuga manor

- Location in Estonia
- Coordinates: 59°06′37″N 26°38′02″E
- Country: Estonia
- County: Lääne-Viru County
- Parish: Vinni Parish
- Time zone: UTC+2 (EET)
  - Summer (DST): UTC+3 (EEST)

Muuga is a village in Vinni Parish, Lääne-Viru County, in northeastern Estonia. Between 1992 and 2017 (until the administrative reform of Estonian municipalities) the village was located in Laekvere Parish.

== Muuga manor ==
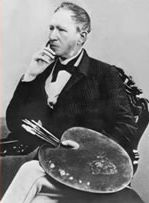
Carl Timoleon von Neff, ca. 1860-70

Muuga manor (German: Münkenhof) traces its history back to the 16th century, when it belonged to the Bridgettine convent in Pirita. During the course of history, it has subsequently belonged to various aristocratic families.

In 1860, Muuga became the property of Carl Timoleon von Neff, a Baltic German painter who was the illegitimate son of a French governess. von Neff constructed the current neo-Renaissance building, intended not only as a home but also as a place to accommodate and display von Neff's large collection of art, which included both his own work and copies of old masters (now part of the Art Museum of Estonia). In many ways, Muuga under von Neff resembled a museum more than a home, and reflected von Neff's carefully orchestrated image.

von Neff designed the building himself, with the aid of St. Petersburg architect Ludwig Bohnstedt, as well as, reputedly, Otto Pius Hippius, Alexander Brullov and David Grimm, all active in St. Petersburg. A concern was how to fit an enormous white marble staircase, a gift from the emperor Alexander II, into the building. The building received a sumptuous interior: terrazzo floors, marble and glazed fireplaces, painted walls and lunettes. Some of the walls were painted by his son, Heinrich.

At the same time, the manor was complemented with a romantic park with ponds and annexes, including a belfry in the form of a neo-Gothic tower.

The interiors were renovated during 1987–1994.

Estonian writer Eduard Vilde grew up in the manor.

== Gallery ==
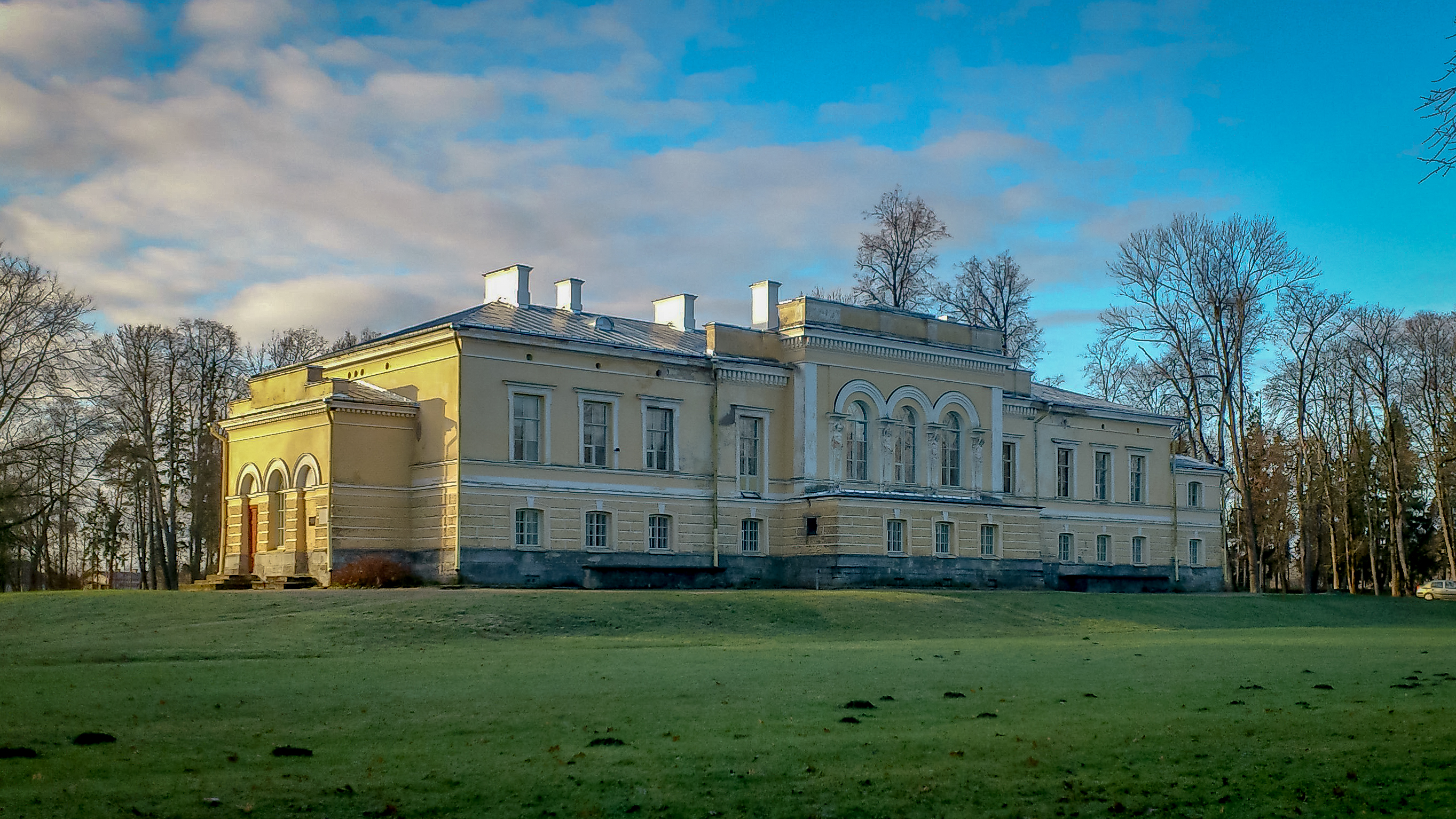
Main building from rear

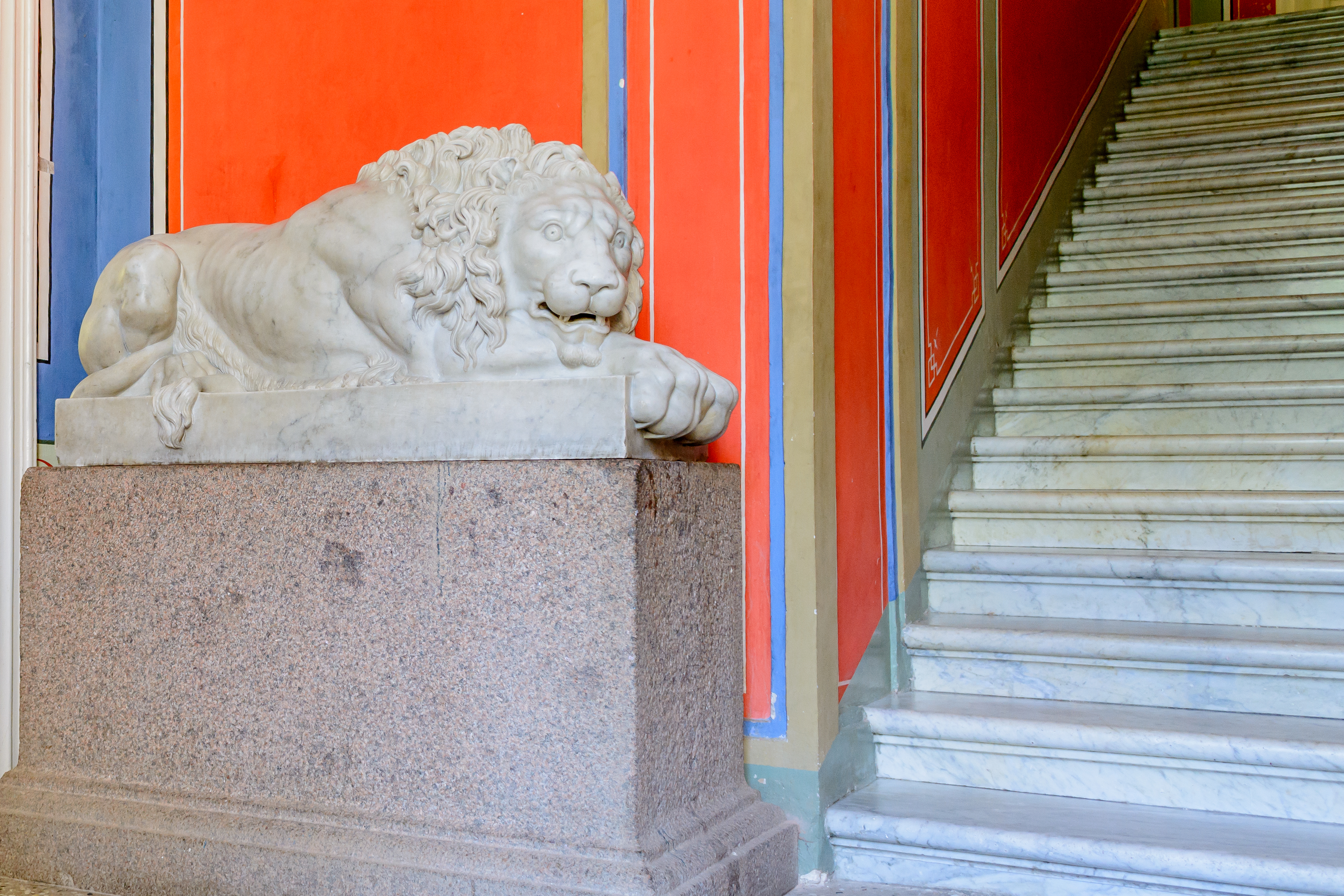
Sculpture "Lying Lion" in the manor from the 19th century.

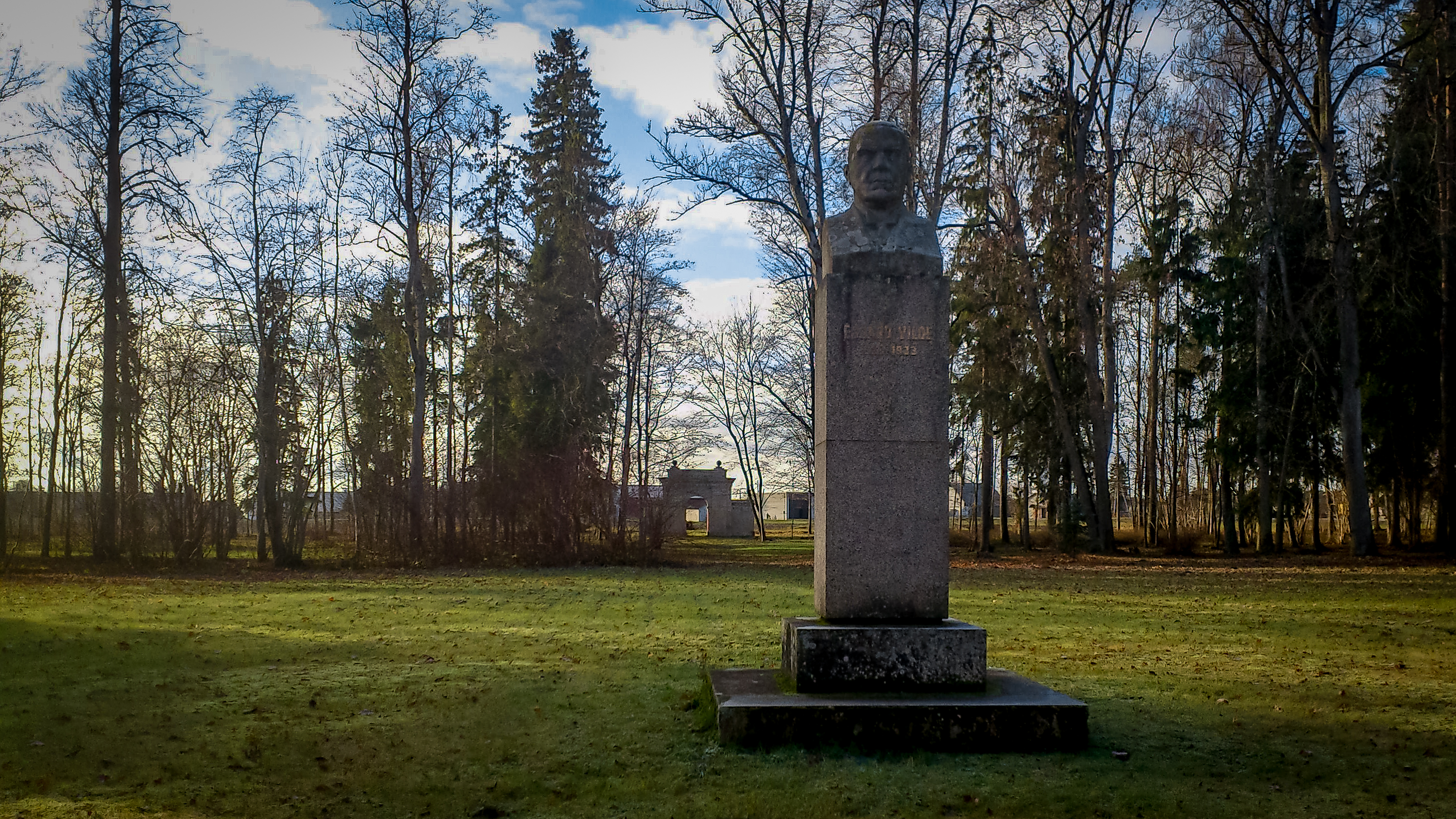
Monument of writer Eduard Vilde

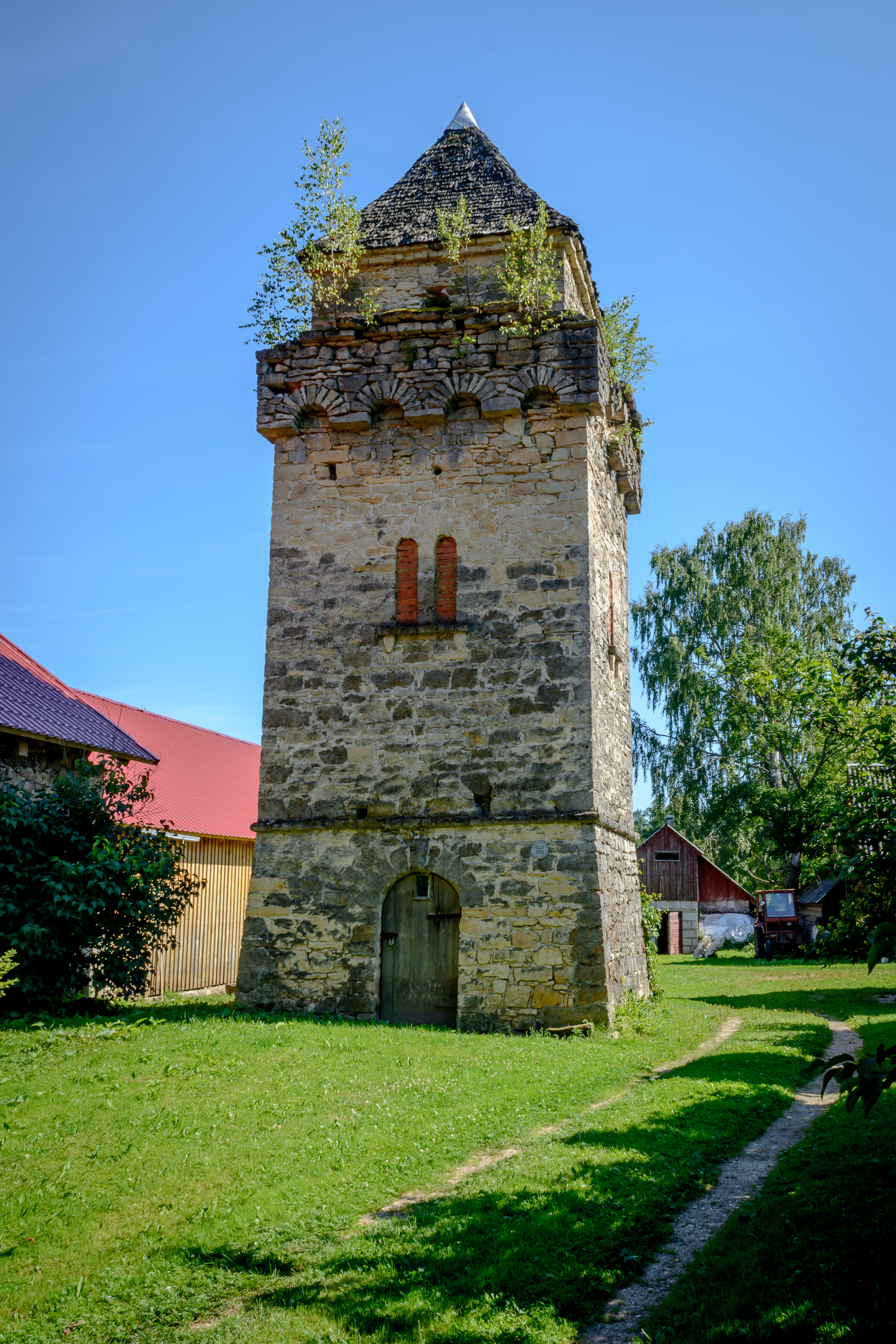
Bell tower

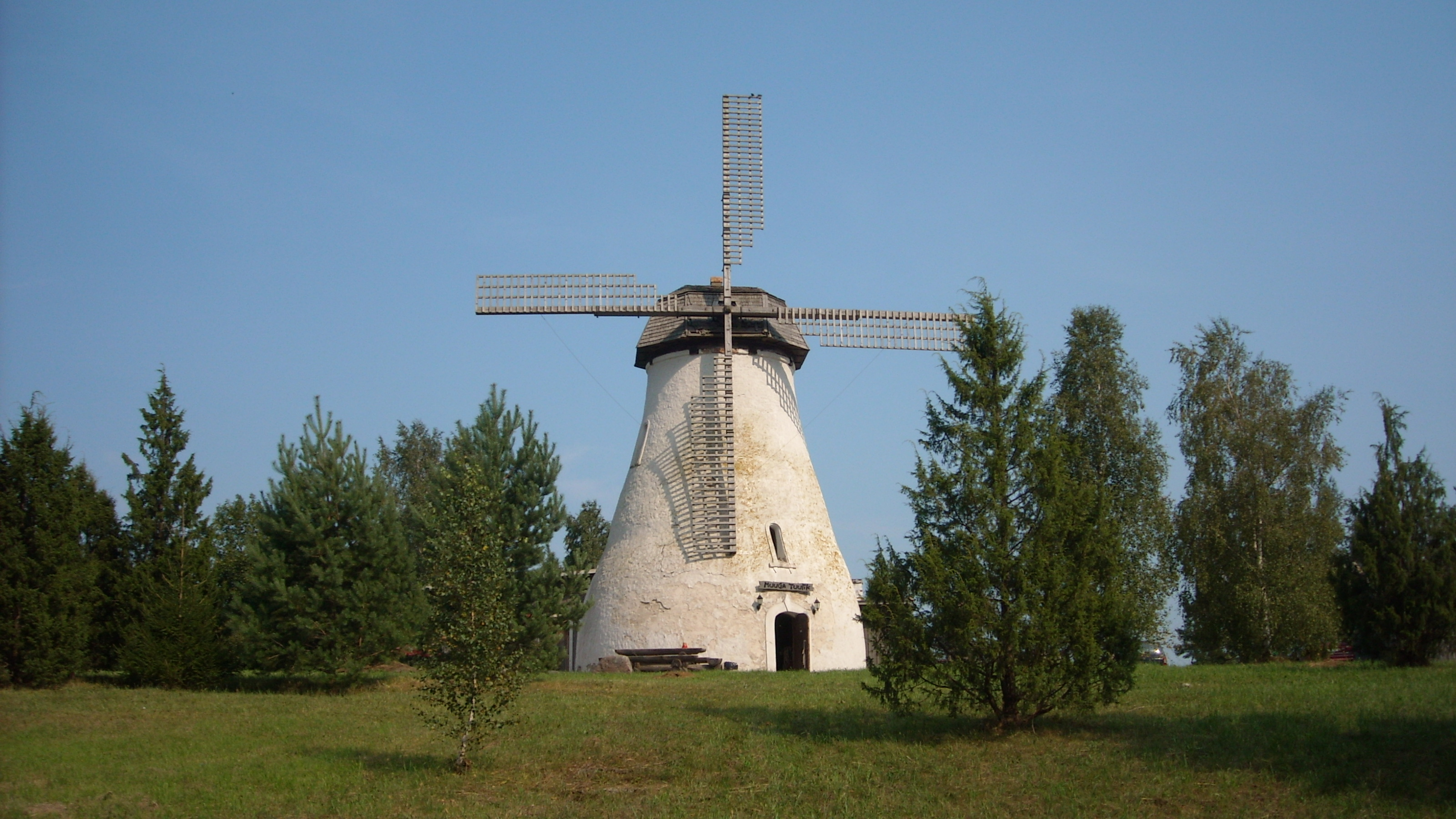
Manor's windmill

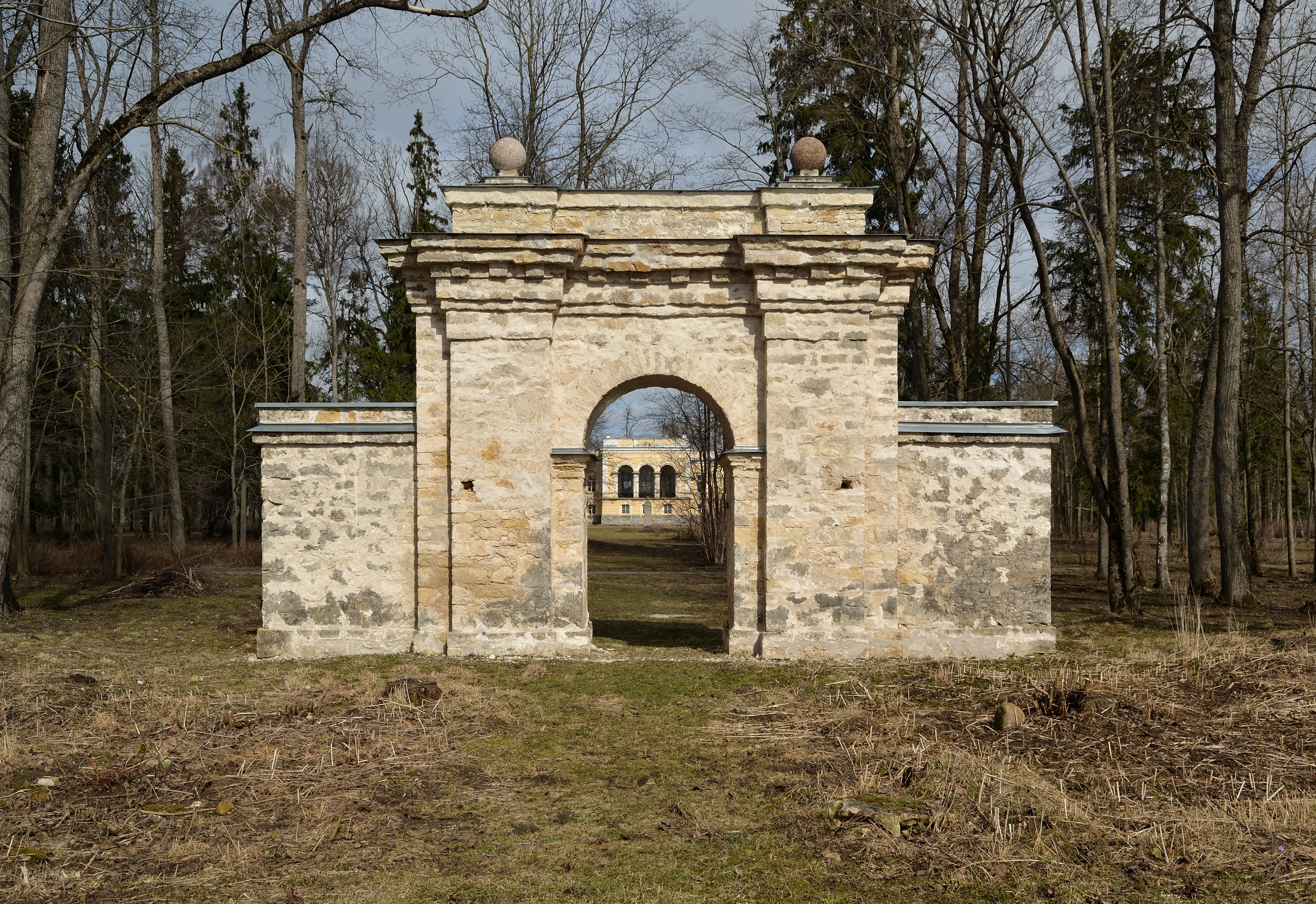
Gate

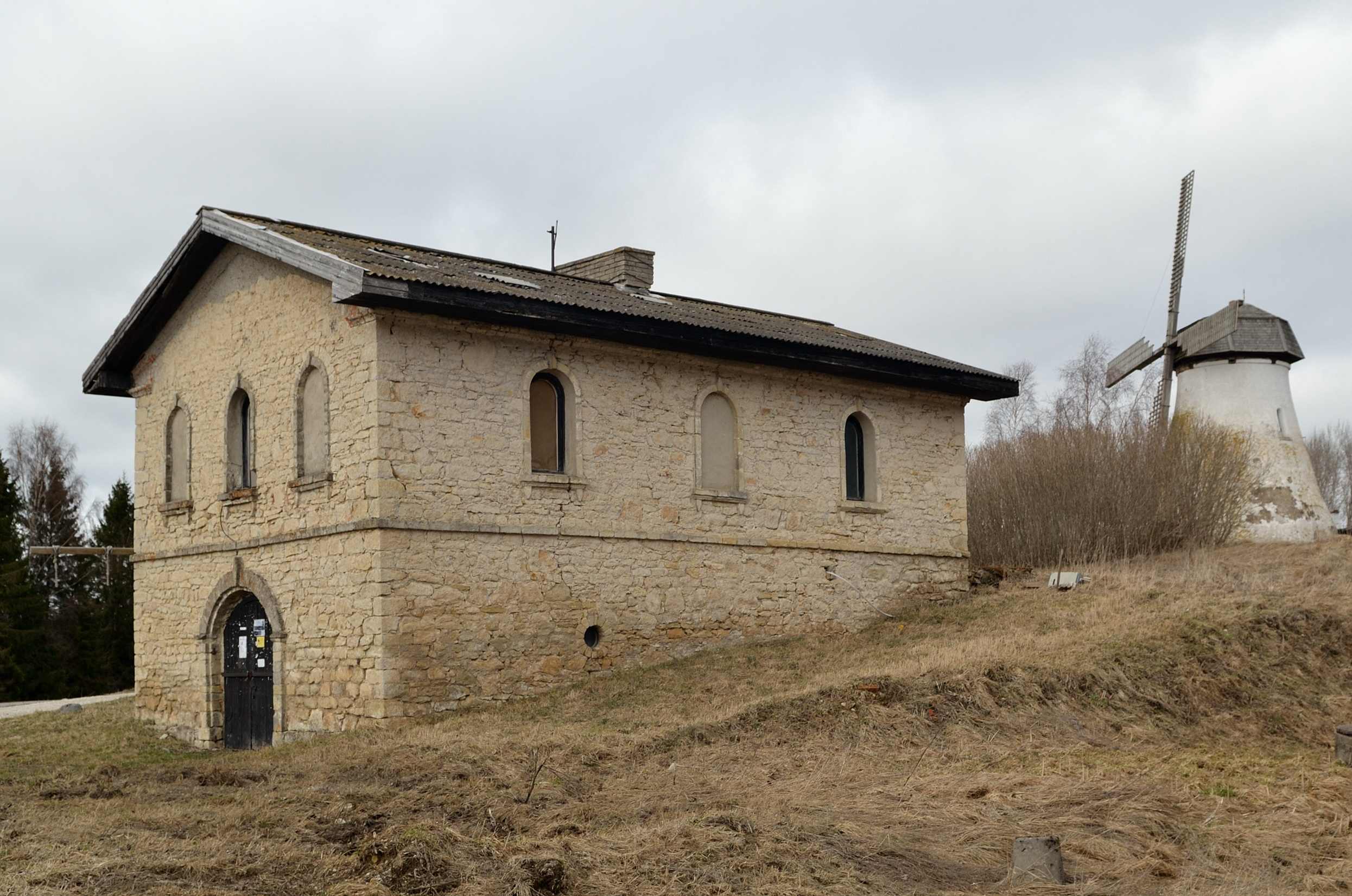
Muuga manor miller's house

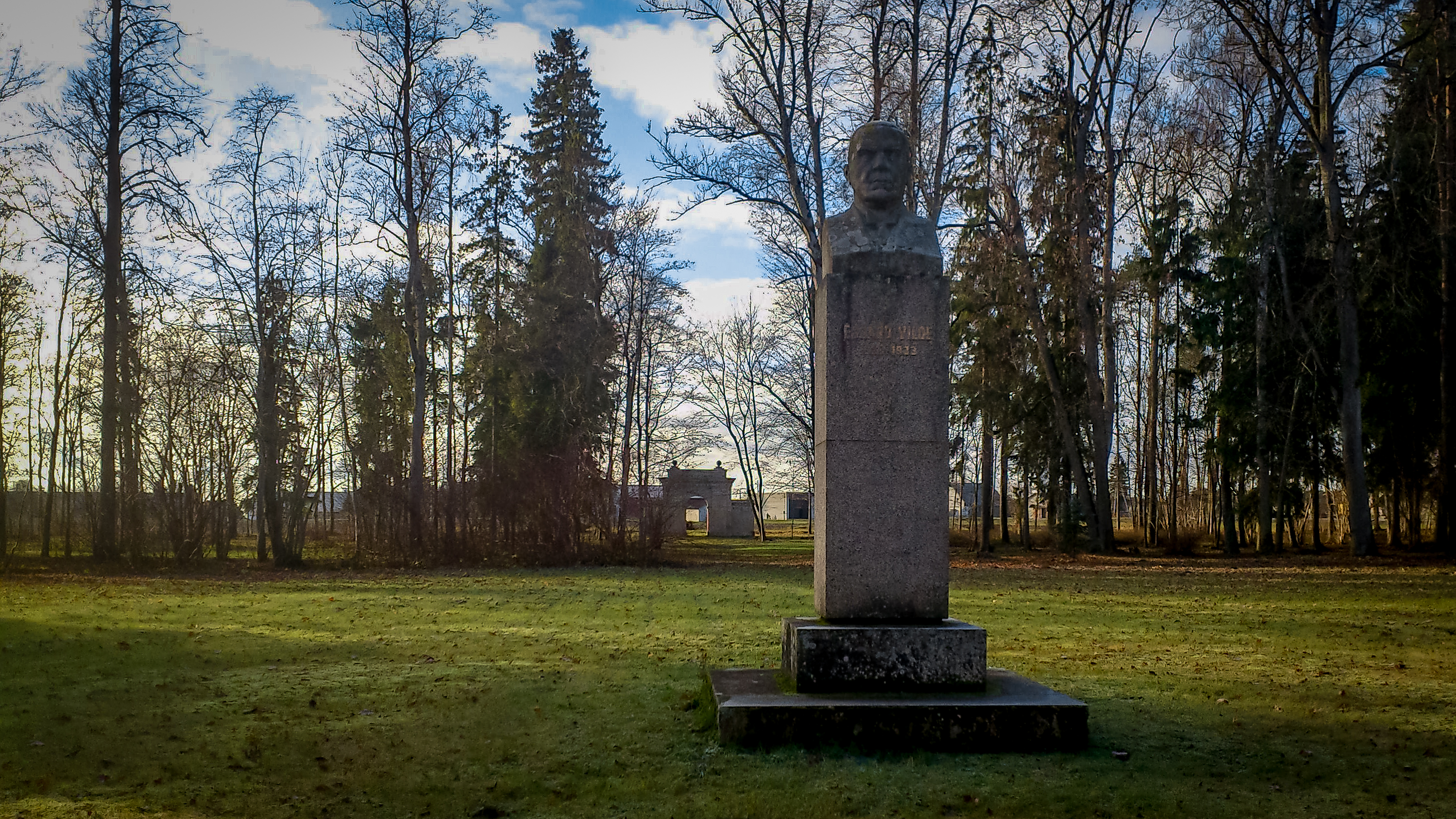
Monument to author Eduard Vilde in front of the main manor house
