= Sangaste Castle =

Coordinates: 57.9018°N 26.2801°E

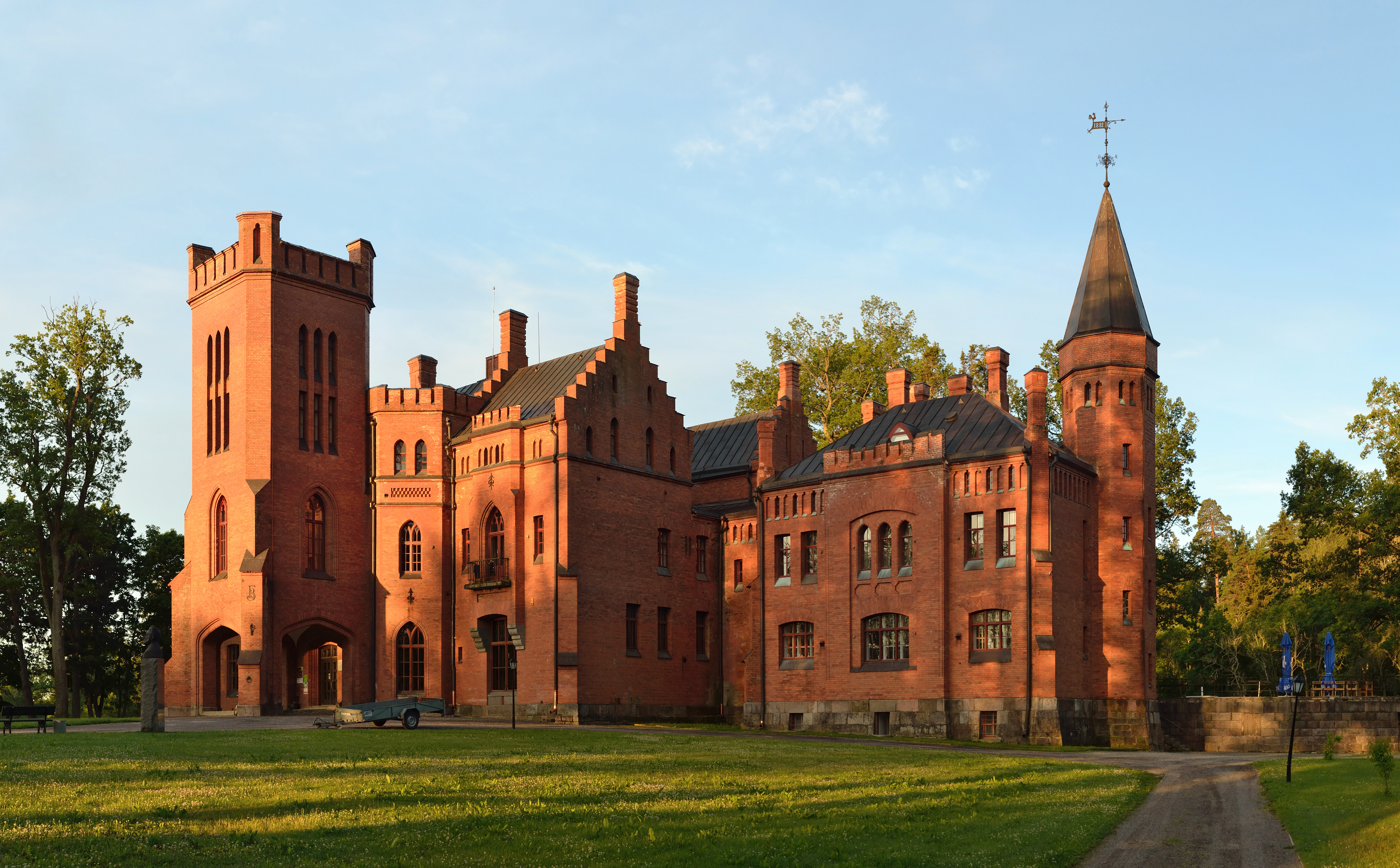
- Interactive map of the Sangaste Castle area

General information
- Architectural style: neo-Gothic and Renaissance
- Location: Sangaste, Estonia
- Construction started: 1879
- Completed: 1881
- Client: Friedrich Berg

Design and construction
- Architect: Otto Pius Hippius

Sangaste Castle (Estonian: Sangaste loss) is a castle in Sangaste, Otepää Parish, Valga County. The castle was built in 1879 to 1881 and designed by the architect Otto Pius Hippius. It is built in a neo-Gothic style with influences from Tudor architecture, and it is considered one of the most impressive examples of Gothic Revival architecture in the Baltic States.

The castle is open to the public. In September 2023 the castle was put up for auction with an opening price of €2.6 million.

== History ==
When F. G. M. von Berg took charge of Sangaste Manor after his father died in 1866, the family lived in an old mansion about 100 meters (330 ft) northwest of the castle. Young Berg wanted a new house inspired by English castles, and so he asked the architect Otto Pius Hippius to draw up plans. It took seven years, from 1874 to 1881, to build the new castle with 99 rooms (to follow a rule about not having more than 100 rooms). Later, as a Soviet Pioneer Camp, it had 149 rooms, including storage spaces.

The main entrance has a tall tower (without a drawbridge or trench) over a big entrance hall. The hall has good acoustics: whispers can be heard from one corner to the other. The castle looks interesting with different-shaped towers, steps, and parts of the building that stick out or go in. A special part of the castle, a glass-roof winter garden, is not there anymore.

On the first floor, there are the main rooms: a large Gothic ballroom, a Spanish room, and an English-style hunting room. The count's bedroom is also on this floor. The second floor included bedrooms for the family of his son Ermes, the son, a library, and a room for playing billiards. The third floor has rooms for the people who worked in the house. In another part of the building, there are guest bedrooms and access to the watchtower.

== Gallery ==
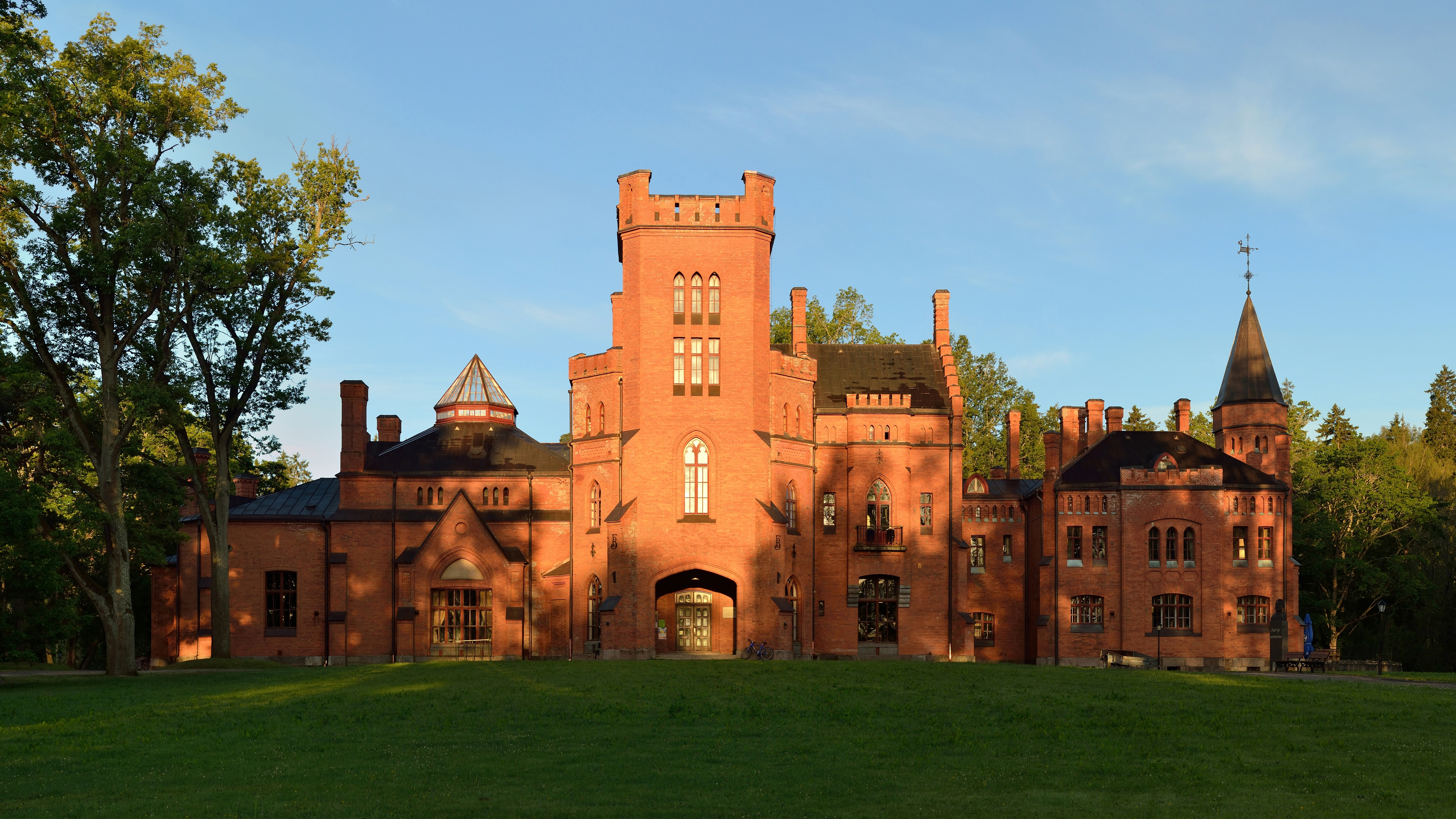
Sangaste Castle

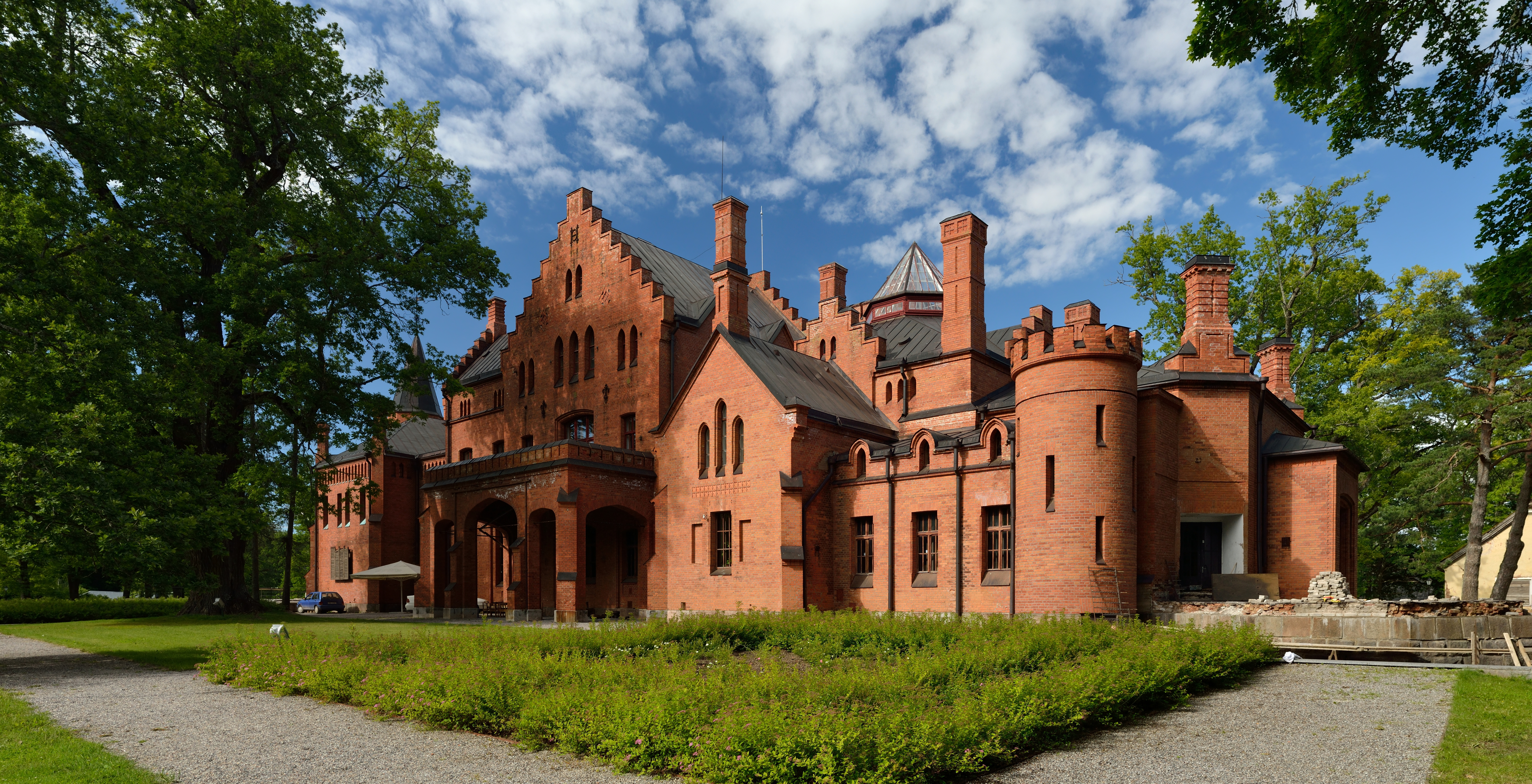
View from back of the castle

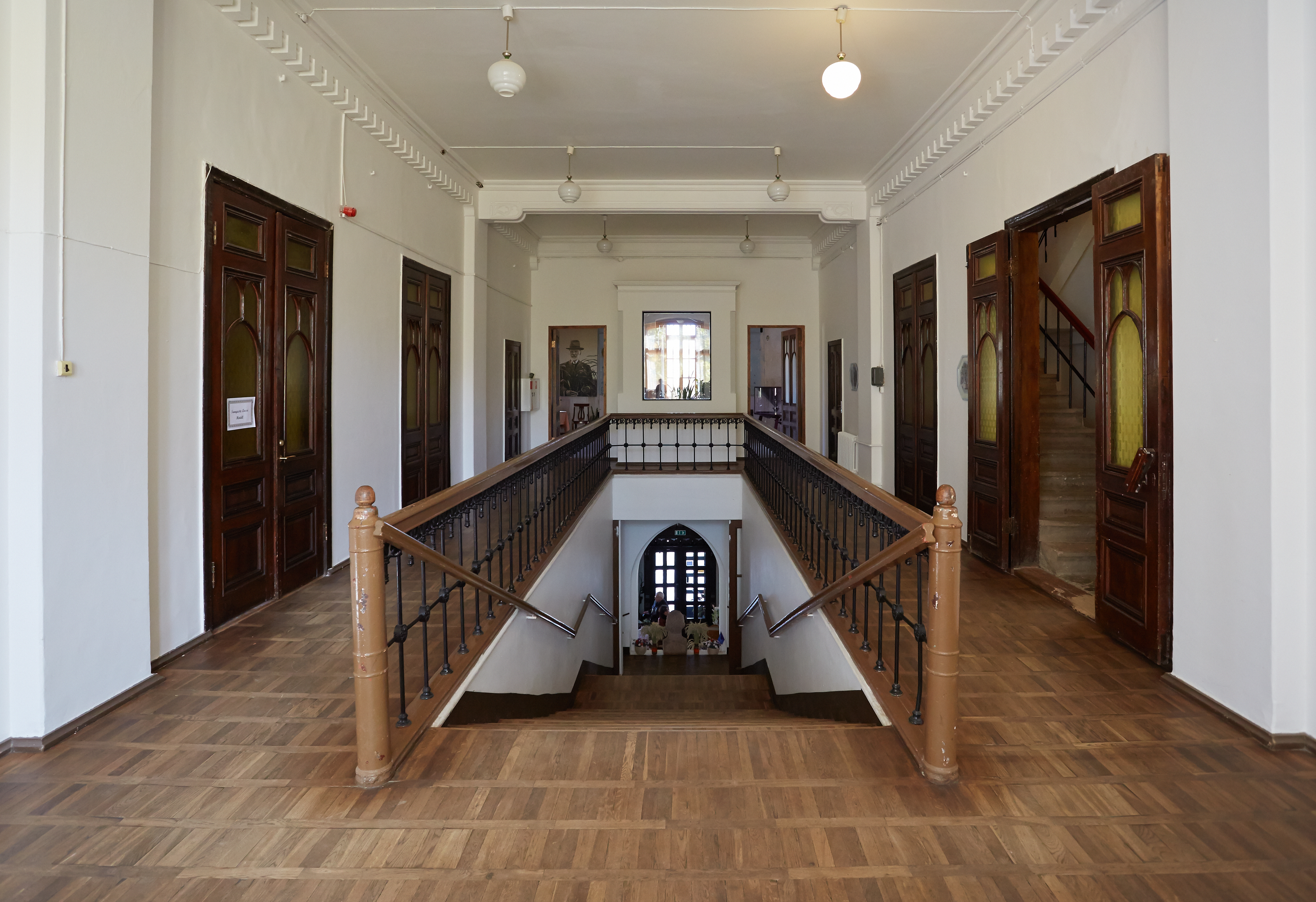
Sangaste Castle staircase

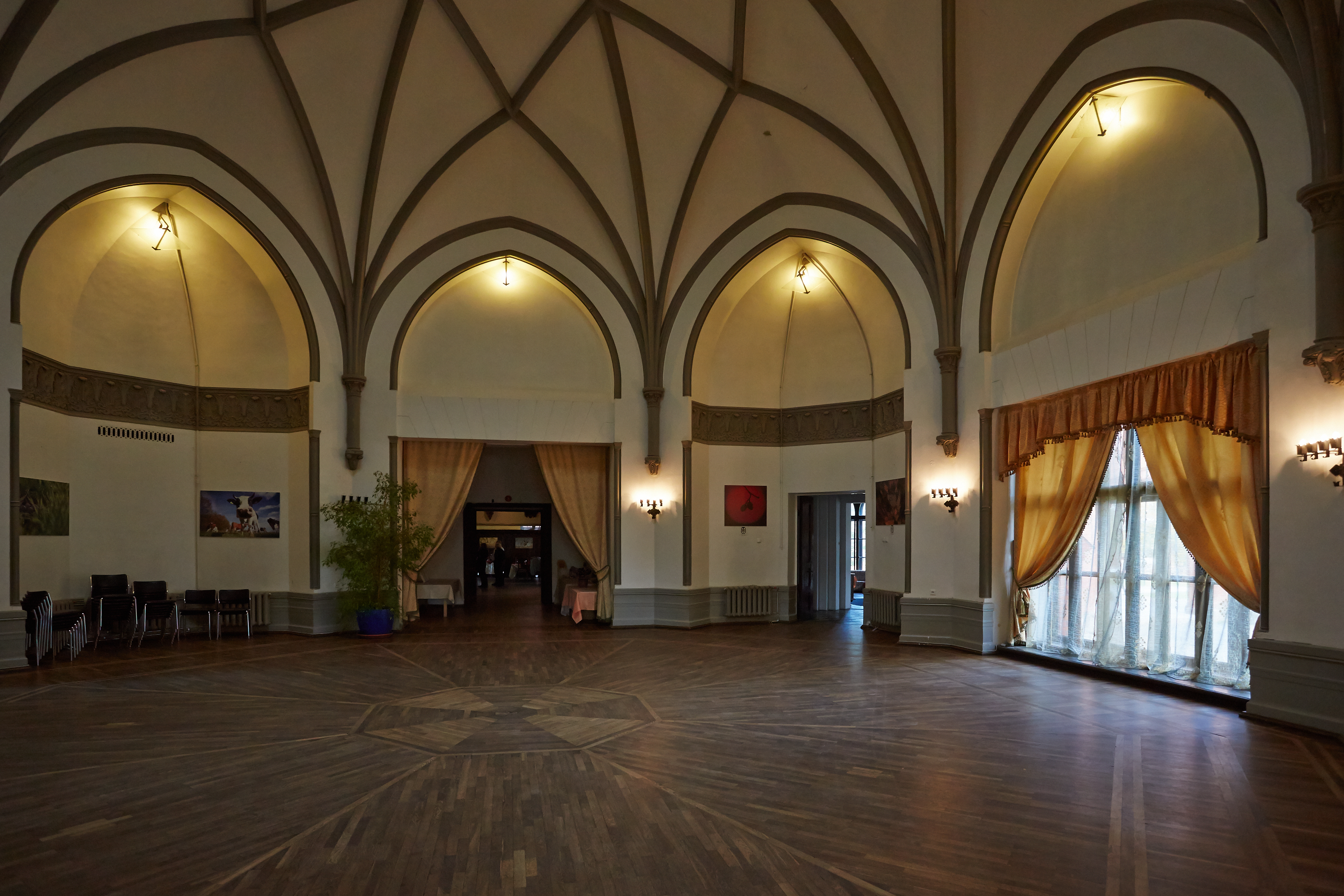
The main Gothic ballroom

== See also ==
- List of castles in Estonia
- List of palaces and manor houses in Estonia
- The Last Motor Race of The Empire Pages 38-39.
