= Gustav Adolf Hippius =

Baltic German painter and lithographer

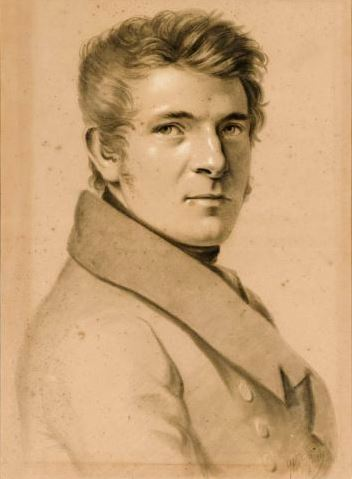
- Autoportrait, 1820
- Born: March 12, 1792; Nissi Parish, Governorate of Estonia, Russian Empire
- Died: October 6, 1856 (aged 64); Reval, Governorate of Estonia, Russian Empire
- Resting place: Hageri, Estonia
- Education: Academy of Fine Arts, Vienna
- Movement: Nazarene movement
- Spouse: Friederike Ignatius
- Children: Otto Pius Hippius; Karl Gustav Hippius

Gustav Adolf Hippius (Russian: Густав Фомич Гиппиус; 12 March 1792, Nissi - 6 October 1856, Tallinn (Reval), Governorate of Estonia, Russian Empire) was a Baltic German portrait painter and lithographer.

== Early life and education ==
Gustav Adolf Hippius was born in Nissi, Estonia, into the family of a poor rural pastor, Thomas Hippius in 1792. He lost his mother at a very young age and was sent to a boarding school in Reval (Tallinn). From the age of 14, he began to earn money for his education by giving lessons in music and drawing, for which he showed particular talent. Hippius initially wanted to pursue a teaching career, but poverty prevented him from attending university.

His first teacher was Eduard Höpner at a gymnasium in Tallinn (Reval) from 1807 to 1811. In Tallinn, Gustav Adolf met Otto Friedrich Ignatius, the son of the Hageri parish pastor David Friedrich Ignatius. Otto was two years younger than Hippius and already chosen the path of an artist. David Friedrich Ignatius ran a boarding house where Carl Sigismund Walther, a German painter invited by August von Kotzebue who otherwise worked as a home tutor for children, gave drawing lessons to the young men. Walther became a great example and influence for both Hippius and Ignatius. After about two years of study, the young men were ready to enter an art academy.

Hippius wanted to continue his studies abroad, and to make this possible, a charity concern was organized in Reval, which unexpectedly raised a large sum of 2,000 rubles. In the winter of 1812, Hippius began his journey to Western Europe. He initially dreamed of studying in Berlin or Dresden, but these plans were disrupted due to War of the Sixth Coalition, and he remained in Prague to work for some time. In early 1814, movement became freer due to the retreat of Napoleon's troops, and Hippius studied copper engraving at the Academy of Fine Arts, Vienna, from till 1815.

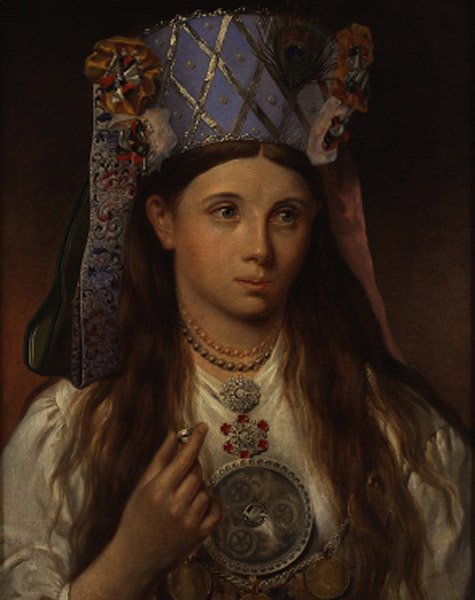
Gustav Adolf Hippius, An Estonian bride, 1852, Art Museum of Estonia, Tallinn

== European Journey and Artistic Development ==
Soon, August Pezold and Hippius's old friend Otto Ignatius, who had left the St. Petersburg Academy, met up and hoped to meet Hippius in Berlin. The journey of these three artists from what is now Estonia has been partially but quite detailed preserved in travel writings, based on which Leopold von Pezold, August Pezold's son, wrote an article in the journal Baltische Monatsschrift in 1890. According to Leopold, the artists intended to publish their travel writings with drawings, but this task was carried out decades later by Leopold. The travel writings represent pages from Hippius's and Ignatius's diaries. Hippius's autobiographical section reflected the period from June 1816 to May 1818.

On September 16, 1816, Hippius left Vienna with painter Johann Lebrecht Eggink to travel on foot. They visited Salzburg, Munich, Venice, and Florence, finally arriving in Rome in April 1817. According to his diary, Hippius admired Giulio Romano's frescoes in Mantua, as well as works by Correggio and Raphael's Saint Cecilia in Bologna. While in Italy among a large number of artists, Hippius developed an interest in the works of 16th and 17th-century Italian masters.

In Rome, Hippius lived for two years, moving in the circle of German Nazarenes, and became particularly close to Johann Friedrich Overbeck. Hippius's studies consisted of studying old masters, copying their paintings, and painting from nature; he lived almost exclusively by selling portraits he drew. During this time, he created portraits of Overbeck, Beethoven (which is now at the Beethoven House in Bonn), and Thorvaldsen. Overbeck, in turn, painted his portrait. In his diary, Hippius wrote that his life's aspirations were reflected in his meetings with four outstanding people of his time – Beethoven, Overbeck, Thorvaldsen, and Pestalozzi – representing music, painting, other arts, and pedagogy.

Hippius was the first of the three friends to leave Italy. In the second half of 1818, he spent about a year in Switzerland, where he visited Pestalozzi in Yverdon and painted his portrait. Along with his portraits of Beethoven and Thorvaldsen, he valued this portrait more than all his other works and published it as a lithograph in 1846 to mark the great educator's centenary.

== Later years ==
Hippius returned to his native Estonia on 9 November 1819. After spending six months in Reval and marrying his friend's sister, Friederike Ignatius (1798-1886), in June 1820, he moved to Saint Petersburg. When Otto Ignatius died in 1824, Hippius had to complete his friend's final work – a mural commissioned for the court church at Tsarskoye Selo.

The artist's works became accidentally known to Count Kapodistria and Georg von Engelhardt, the director of the Tsarskoye Selo Lyceum. They supported him financially and enabled him to undertake the publication of "Contemporaries. A Collection of Lithographed Portraits of Government Officials, Writers, and Artists. Dedicated to His Imperial Majesty Emperor Alexander I. Les Contemporains, par G. Hippius" (1822, large folio), in 9 issues with 5 portraits in each (reproductions in enlarged form of portraits by Hippius himself). After publishing his edition, the artist approached the Society for the Encouragement of Artists, asking for assistance in its sale. The Society's committee expressed its willingness to help distribute Hippius' publication. It appears that the publication was not completed, and some portraits prepared by Hippius were not included in it.

Gustav Adolf Hippius was also engaged in teaching (particularly at the Educational House and the Saint-Petersburg Elizabethan Institute) and published several teaching aids. In the early 1850s, he returned to Reval, where he continued to paint portraits. He died in Tallinn on 6 October 1856, and was buried in the Hageri cemetery.

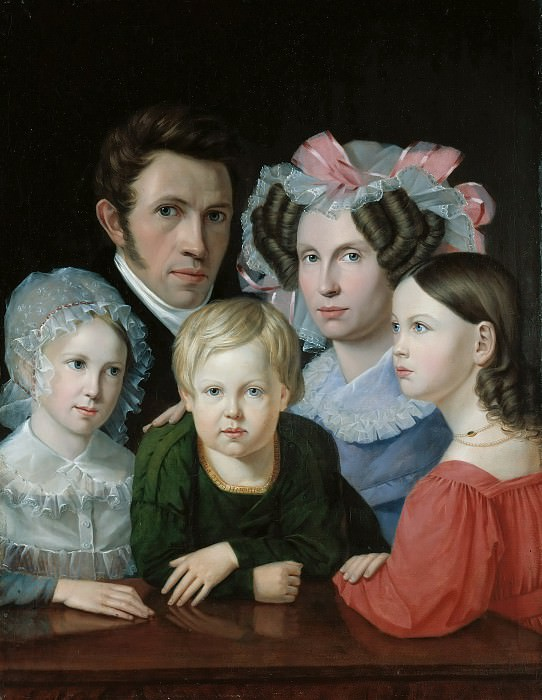
Self-portrait with his family (1829): # Himself # Friederike Ignatius (wife) # Friederike Adelheid (daughter) # Otto Pius (son) # Anna Emilie Caroline (daughter)

== Family ==
Gustav Adolf Hippius married Friederike Ignatius in 1820, daughter of David Friedrich Ignatius and Magdalene Ignatius (née von Krusenstiern), a sister of his friend Otto Ignatius in Saint Petersburg. They had two daughters and two sons. Their sons Otto Pius and Karl Gustav became well-known architects. Through his daughters, Gustav Adolf was a grandfather to architect Otto von Dessien and pianist Adelheid Hippius.

== Legacy ==
Hippius was a prolific portraitist whose work shows Nazarene influences, acquired during his seven-year educational journey. He is known to have portrayed almost all members of the German artists' colony in Rome. For example, in 1924, his drawing of Carl Christian Vogel von Vogelstein's portrait was in the Dresden Royal Print Cabinet, and Karl Fohr's portrait was in the Heidelberg city art collection. Riga Cathedral Museum held his portrait of Pezold. The artist was also interested in Estonian subjects. His well-known works "Estonian Young Wife" and "Estonian Bride" (1852) are in the collections of the Art Museum of Estonia in Tallinn. Both paintings depict his servant Miina. Portrait art in the Baltic region began to flourish only at the beginning of the 19th century, strongly influenced by Gustav Adolf Hippius, Gerhard von Reutern, and August Pezold, who all traveled and studied in different countries. The life and art knowledge gained abroad made them depict the Estonian rural population in a manner completely different from what had been customary for the local Baltic Germans.

== Published works ==
- "The Young Draughtsman, a course of progressive studies for use in schools" (French: Le jeune dessinateur, cours d'études progressives à l'usage des écoles) in 4 notebooks, with 32 sheets of drawings
- An album of 66 sheets of heads from paintings by Italian masters of the 15th and 16th centuries and 24 sheets depicting various flowers.
- "Essays on the Theory of Drawing" (German: Grundlinien einer Theorie der Zeichenkunst) was published in Saint Petersburg and Leipzig in 1842.
- "Art schools. Compiled for the needs of the school" (German: Kunstschulen. Zusammengetragen für das Bedürfniss der Schule; Leipzig, 1850) was dedicated to a popular exposition of art history.

== Sources ==
- Eesti elulood (Estonian Biographies), Eesti entsüklopeediakirjastus, Tallinn 2000 ISBN 9985-70-064-3, pg.91
- P. Ettinger: "Hippius, Gustav Adolf". In: Hans Vollmer (Ed.): Allgemeines Lexikon der Bildenden Künstler von der Antike bis zur Gegenwart, Vol.17: Heubel–Hubard. E. A. Seemann, Leipzig 1924, pp. 123–124
- Entry on Hippius @ the Baltische Historische Kommission
- Anne Lõugas, Neli baltisaksa kunstnikku: Carl Siegismund Walther, Friedrich Ludwig von Maydell, August Georg Wilhelm Pezold, Gustav Adolf Hippius, Tallinna Raamatutrükikoda, 1994
- " Гиппиус, Густав Фомич" (Hippius, Gustav Fomich), by N. P. Chulkov, from the Russian Biographical Dictionary, @ Russian Wikisource
