= Governor's House (Baku) =

- Azerbaijani: Qubernatorun evi
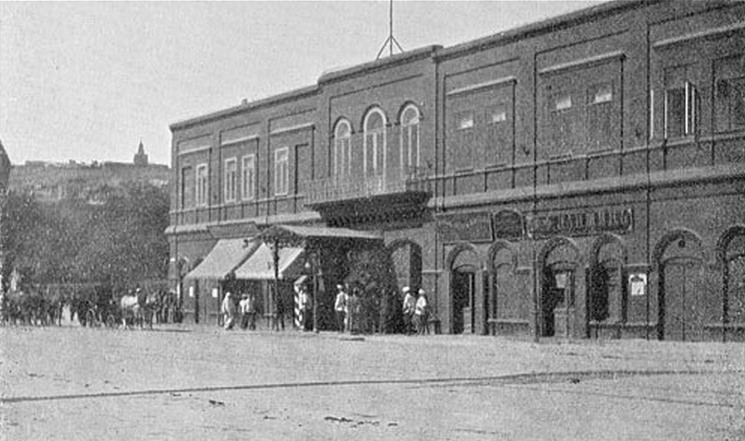
- Interactive map of the Governor's House area

General information
- Type: Mansion
- Location: Neftchilar ave, Baku, Azerbaijan
- Coordinates: 40°21′48″N 49°50′06″E
- Construction started: 1895
- Completed: 1897
- Demolished: 2006
- Client: Hacı Neymət Seyidov

Design and construction
- Architect: Karl Gustav Hippius

The Governor's House in Baku, Azerbaijan, was the Governor's abode in Baku. It was built in 1865–1867. Then, businessman Seyid Mirbabayev bought the building, leased it to the governors of the Russian Empire as the first official residence for this position.

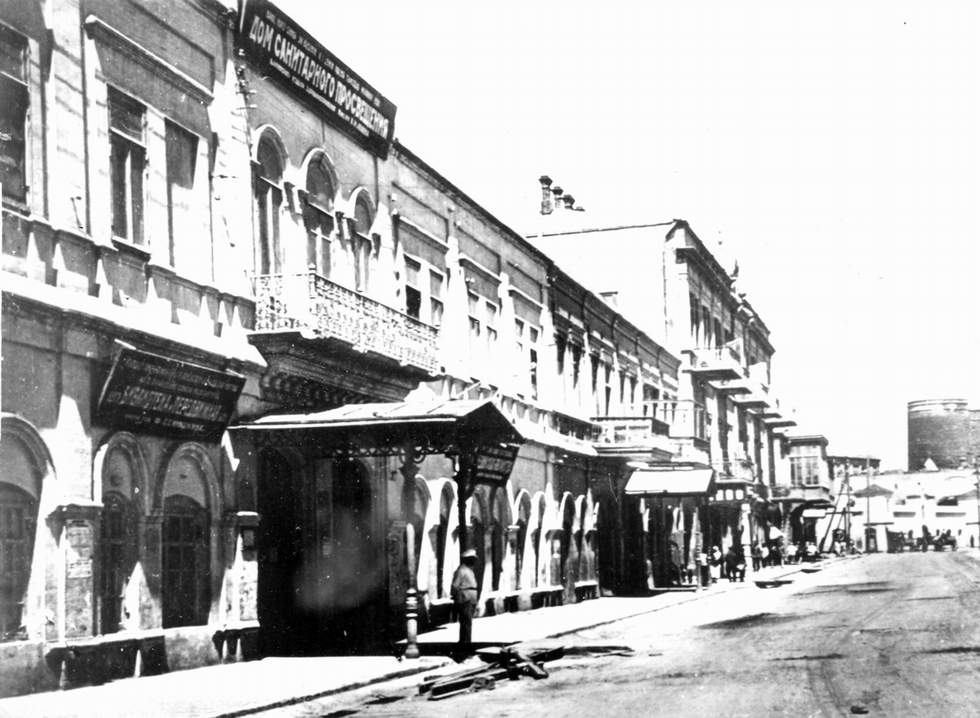
Health Education Center in 1928

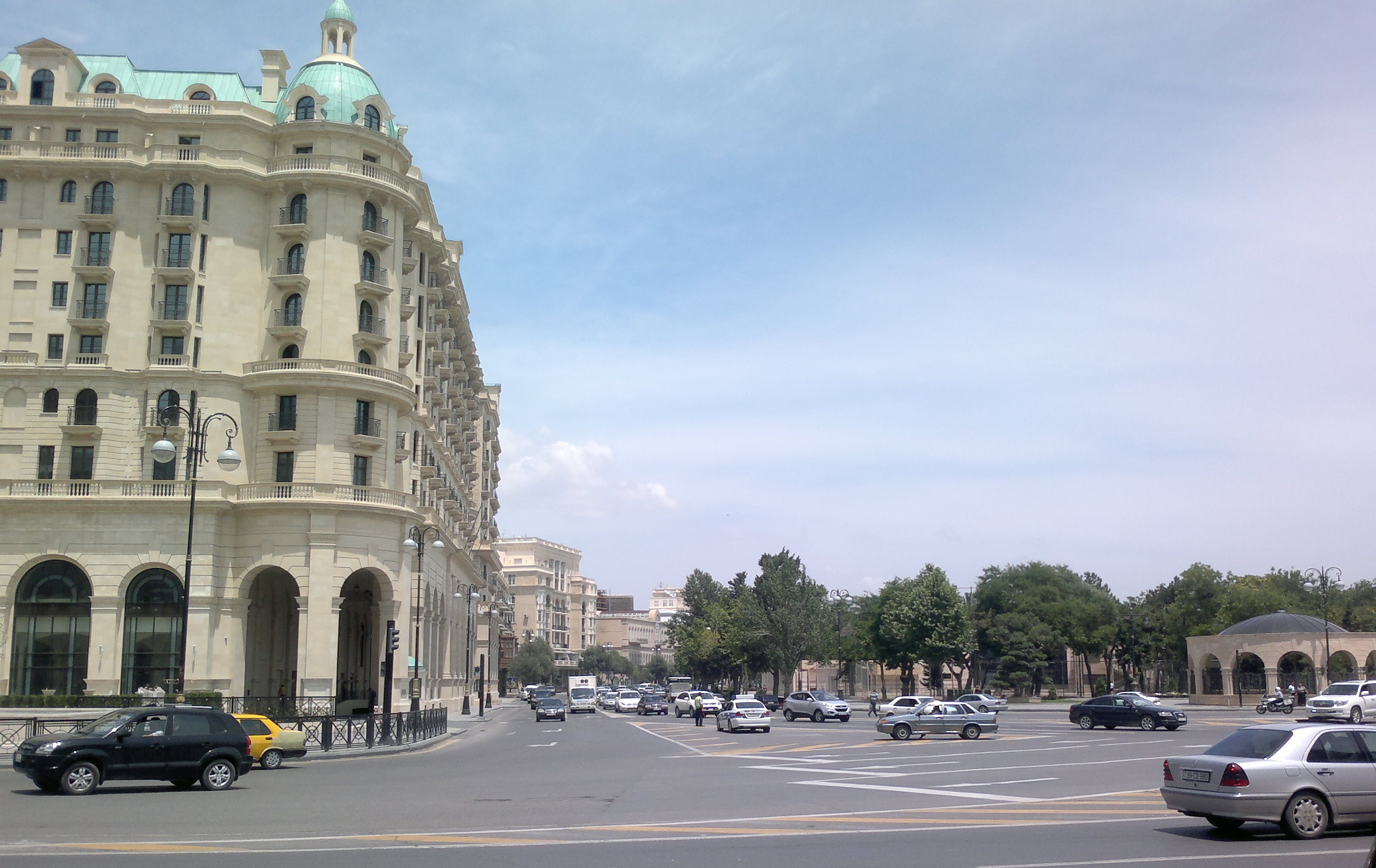
Four Season Hotel in Baku, Neftchilar Avenue where built on the site of demolished House of Gubernator

When the governor first moved from Shamakhi to Baku, no building in the city had been designated for him.

== History ==
In 1868, a three-story house with "necessary services, a yard, garden and furniture" was hired for the governor, and it became known as "governor's house."

After the building of monumental and office facades in the city, this house stopped satisfying the aesthetic needs of the governors of Baku. The neighborhood of rich buildings next to the governor's house would have affected "the shape of the form" and they raised the issue of building a special building.

In October 1906, a decree on the establishment of the governorate of Baku was signed, and this house became the residence of mayors of Baku. During this period, another building in the governor's office, Nikolayevskaya 7 (now called Istiglaliyyat Street), had been leased.

During the Soviet era, the building became the home of medical staff. In the 1920s and 1930s it was called the Chamber of Health Education and hosted a social hygiene museum. The building was rebuilt and reached three-stories. In 2006 the building was demolished. According to Baku City Executive Power, the building was completely destroyed: "Our plans were to restore it, but in this case, architecture recommended removing it.

The five-star Four Seasons Hotel Baku was later built on this site. Its opening ceremony was held on September 3, 2012.
