= Zodchii =

Former Russian architectural periodical

- Zodchii Vol. 5, No. 1 (1876)
- Editor: Ivan Merts
- Editor: Nicolas de Rochefort
- Editor: Leon Benois
- Editor: Victor Ewald
- Categories: Architecture
- Frequency: Monthly 1872-1881; bi-monthly 1882; 2 issues 1883; single special issue in 1884; monthly 1885 through 1891; weekly 1902-1917; monthly January-February 1918; publication suspended March 1918-1923; single issue in 1924
- Founded: 1872
- Final issue: 1924
- Country: Russian Empire, Soviet Union
- Based in: Saint Petersburg / Petrograd / Leningrad
- Language: Russian

Zodchii (Russian: Зодчий, pre-1918 spelling: Зодчій, lit. 'The Architect') was a Russian architectural periodical published in Saint Petersburg from 1872 to 1924.

== History ==
Zodchii was the official organ of the Saint Petersburg (later: Petrograd) Society of Architects and was an important pre-revolutionary Russian architectural periodical. First published in 1872, it appeared monthly (between 1902 and December 1917 weekly) through February 1918. A single issue followed in 1924. A weekly supplement, Nedelia Stroitelia (Builders' Weekly), was published from 1881 until 1903.

Zodchii published articles on architecture, the history of architecture, and construction technology, book and exhibitions reviews, reports on professional meetings of the Society of Architects, as well as "information on technical innovations in Western Europe and the United States." Since 1872, it ran a regular column on construction in the United States.

== Editors ==
Among the editors of Zodchii were the engineers and architects Ivan Merts (from 1872 to 1875), Nicolas de Rochefort (from 1878 to 1881), and Leon Benois (from 1892 to 1895), and the engineer, architect, cellist, and composer Victor Ewald (from 1910 to 1924).
