= Otto Pius Hippius =

Baltic German architect

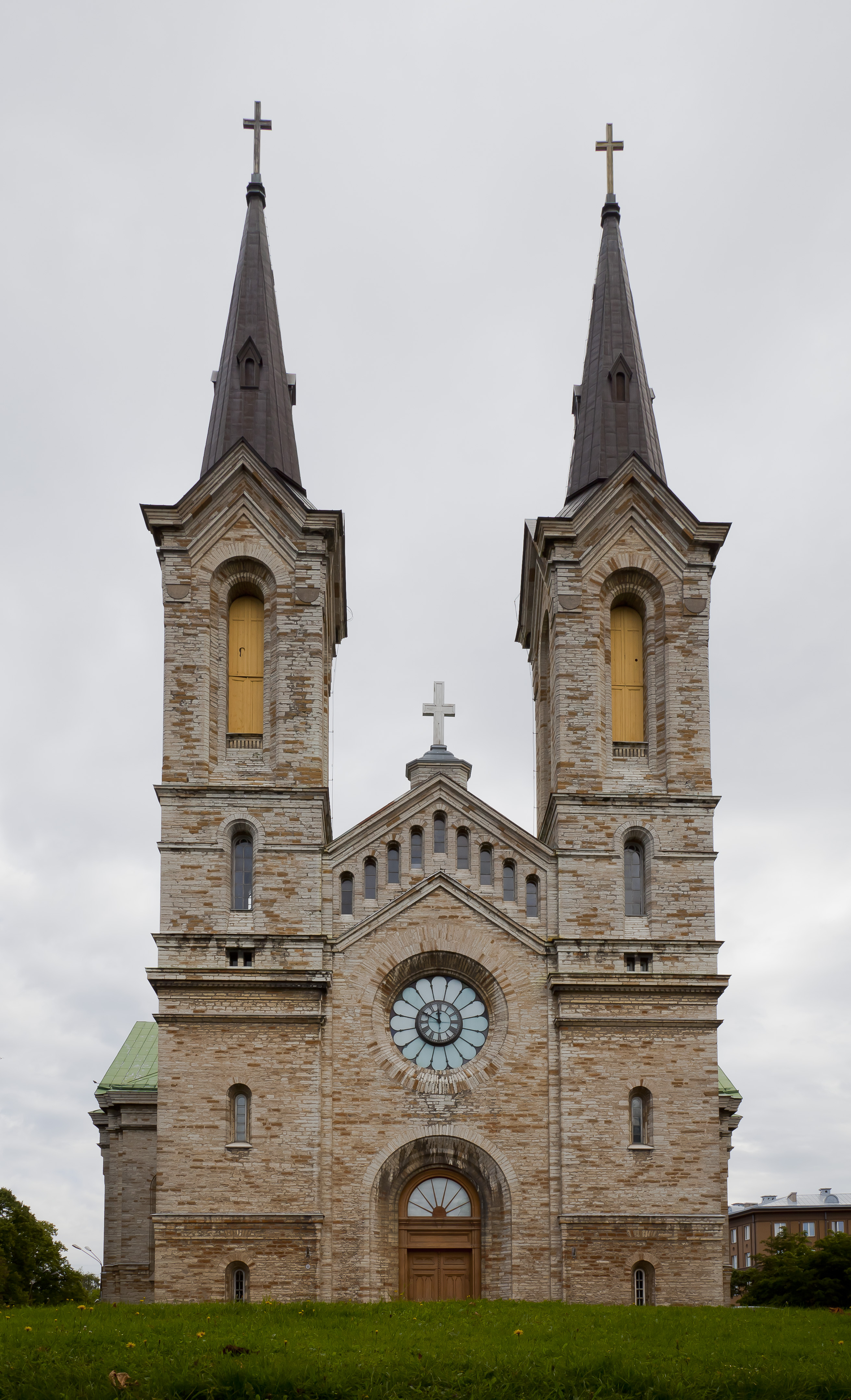
Charles' Church in Tallinn

Otto Pius Hippius (17 May [O.S. 5 May] 1826, Saint Petersburg – 10 September [O.S. 29 August] 1883, Saint Petersburg) was a Baltic German architect, particularly noted for several buildings in present-day Estonia.

== Life and works ==
Otto Hippius was born to the painter and lithographer, Gustav Adolf Hippius, who taught his son art at a very early age. As a teenager, Otto Hippius studied in Germany and, in 1849, he graduated with honors from Karlsruhe Institute of Technology. From 1849 to 1851 he studied at the Imperial Academy of Arts in Saint Petersburg. Upon graduation, he worked as an architect and teacher at several art schools. In 1864 Hippius became a member of the Russian Academy of Sciences and in 1879 he became a professor.

Among his works are Sagnitz Manor (now in Sangaste) in southern Estonia, built for Count Friedrich Wilhelm Rembert von Berg between 1879 and 1883; Münkenhof Manor (now in Muuga), built for the painter Carl Timoleon von Neff between 1866 and 1873; Charles' Church in Reval (now Tallinn), constructed between 1862 and 1870; and Alexander's Cathedral in Narva, constructed between 1881 and 1884.

== See also ==
- List of Baltic German architects
