= Otto Friedrich Ignatius =

Baltic German painter (1794–1824)

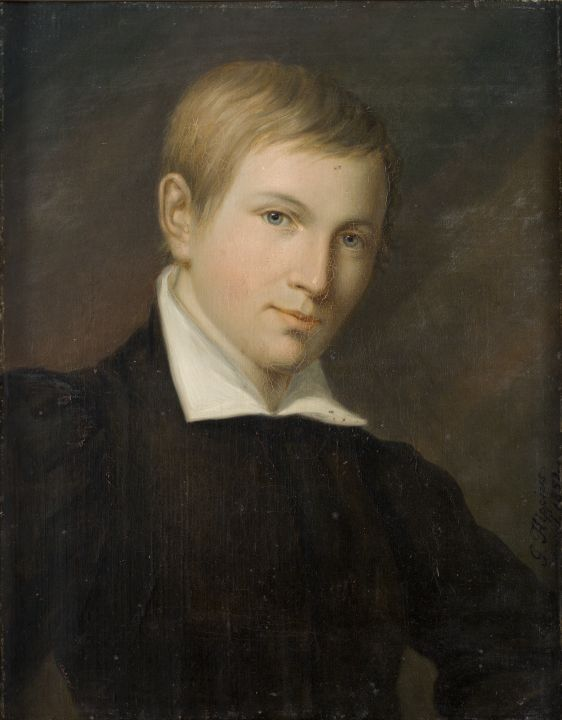
Otto Friedrich Ignatius; posthumous portrait by Gustav Adolf Hippius

Otto Friedrich Ignatius (28 July 1794 in Hageri – 7 September 1824 in Saint Petersburg) was a Baltic-German painter, writer, and composer.

== Life and work ==
His father, David Friedrich Ignatius, was a parish priest and theologian, who founded a school where he received his first drawing lessons. His teacher was Carl Sigismund Walther; a famous painter from Dresden. One of his fellow students, Gustav Adolf Hippius, also became a prominent painter, and a lifelong friend. He married Ignatius' sister, Friederike (1798–1886), in 1820.

From 1812 to 1813, he studied at the Imperial Academy of Fine Arts in St. Petersburg. This was followed by studies at the Academy of Arts, Berlin, with Friedrich Georg Weitsch. In 1815, together with Hippius and August Georg Wilhelm Pezold, he went to Dresden, then Prague and Vienna. At the Academy of Fine Arts in Vienna, he was a student of Heinrich Friedrich Füger.

His travels then took him to Italy, in 1817, where he lived and worked in Rome for two years. He also became associated with the Nazarene movement. He returned to Hageri in 1819, but was there only briefly before moving to Reval (Tallinn).

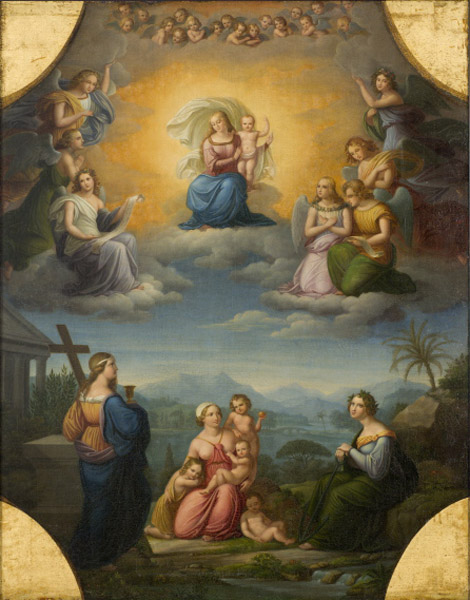
Study for a religious scene

The following year, he became a painter for the court of Tsar Alexander I, at the Hermitage. He held that position until 1824, when he died of tuberculosis, shortly after the death of his wife, Adelheid, to whom he had been married for only a little more than a year.

His best known works are portraits, although he also created numerous works on religious themes. What would have been his greatest work, a wall painting in the church at Tsarskoye Selo, was left unfinished when he died. It was later completed by his friend, Hippius, but was ultimately destroyed during World War II.

He was also an amateur writer, producing poems and dramas; including a tragedy on the life of Marino Faliero (1824). He wrote songs as well. His Italian diary was published posthumously, in 1830.
