= Tudu, Estonia =

Borough in Estonia

Tudu
- Small borough
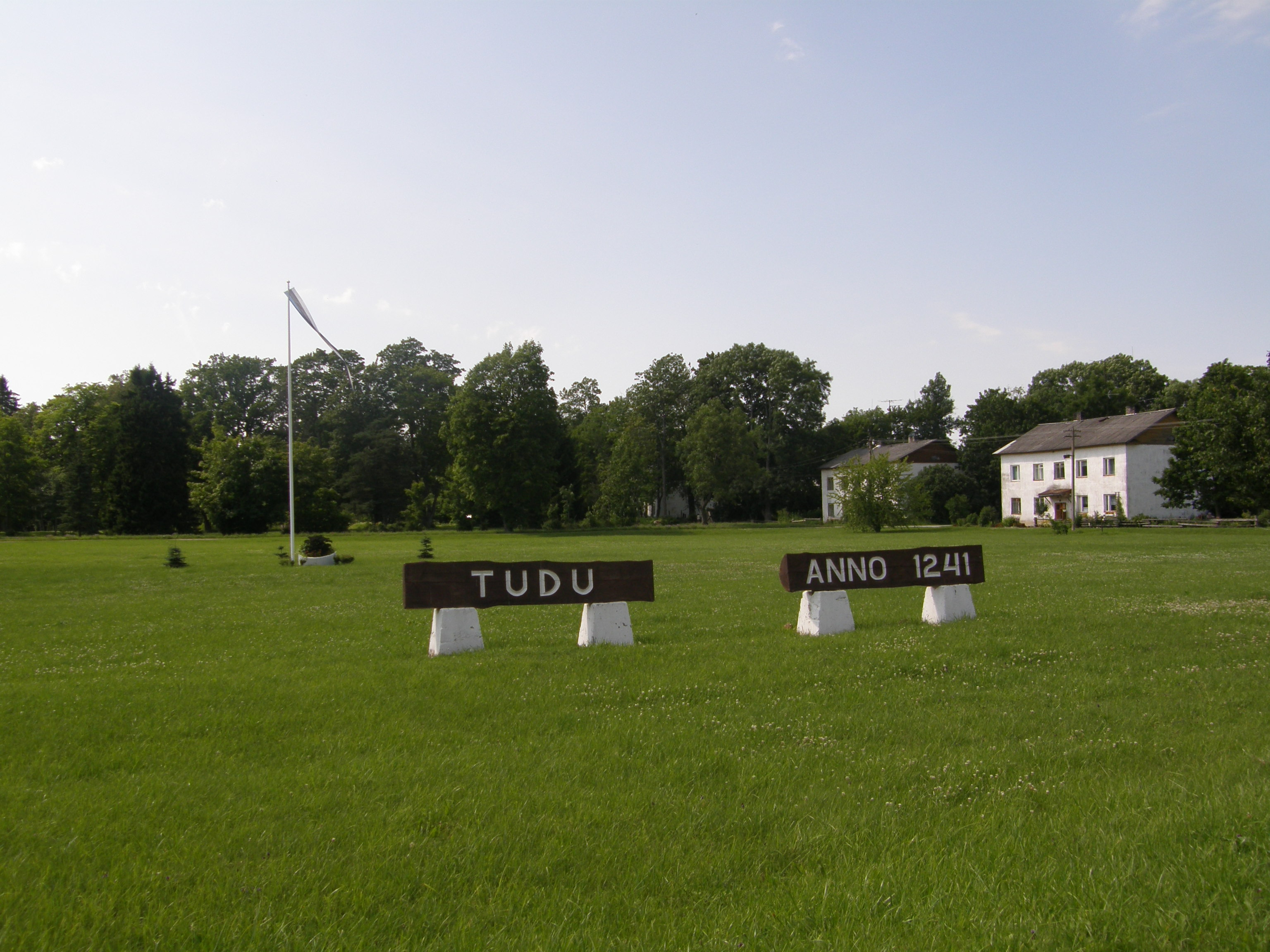

- Location in Estonia
- Coordinates: 59°10′51″N 26°51′23″E
- Country: Estonia
- County: Lääne-Viru County
- Municipality: Vinni Parish

Area
  - Total: 20.12 km^{2} (7.77 sq mi)

Population (2021 Census)
  - Total: 235
  - Density: 11.7/km^{2} (30.3/sq mi)

Tudu (German: Tuddo) is a small borough (Estonian: alevik) in Vinni Parish, Lääne-Viru County, in northeastern Estonia. It is situated northeast of Lake Tudu and had a population of 235 at the time of the 2021 census.

== History ==
Tudu was mentioned first time in writing in 1241 in Danish Census Book (Liber Census Damae) as a location. However the archeological findings on the area go the early 1st millennium as stone graves were discovered from the area. Written records from the time after Danish Census Book also show that area from Anguse village to Lake Peipus was thought to be empty an inhabited. However there were many villages in the area and Tudu was one of them and average village had 4-5 smokes (farms). As a result peasants there continued to live like their forefathers before Livonian Crusade and Serfdom lasted 300-500 years, being significantly shorter than in rest of Estonia. It is not known when Baltic Germans did discover the villages and took them under their control. What is first official written mark is the construction of Tudu Manor in 1739-1744. The area was legally separated from Ulvi Manor. Records from 1840 do show that in Tudu Manor, there was 110 residents. Also there was dairy, Gristmill, Sawmill, Lime kiln, Stone Quarry, Vodka Distillery, up to 8 Forges, bottle factory (most of its production was taken to Saint Petersburg market) and Tar Oven used to make bricks.

In the 19th century a glass factory was opened in Tudu. It was closed in 1879.

Tudu school was founded 1850. New school building was built 1927/28, there was 78 pupils at the time, but it burned down 1944 during a bombing. As a result education was continued in 3 different houses with serious lack of space. 3rd school building was built 1959. During the 1959 till 2004 school had different names and on average 20-150 pupils during different times. From 2013 there were discussions about future of education in Tudu as the number of pupils had been falling consistently last years. Talks about closing were circulating as Vinni Parish was paying annually extra 18 000 eur to support Tudu school. 2014 due to deteriorating situation, school became 6 grade school instead of 9 grade. 2022 the school had only 8 pupils (2nd grade 5, 3rd grade 2 and 4th grade 1) and no improvement in sight. 8 children did finish local kindergarten but only 2 was supposed to start primary education in Tudu school. 24.03.22 Vinni Parish council took a decision to close the school in 2022, at the end of the school year. 23.06.22 was official last day and reunion was held for current and local students. 100 people did attend and building is still in use as a library and kindergarten for locals.

At the 2011 Census, the settlement's population was 302, of which the Estonians were 291 (96.4%).

Tudu has Lutheran church and it also has its Lutheran Congregation. This was a very small congregation so it formally joined to Viru-Jaakobi Congregation, located in Viru-Jaagupi, in 2005.

The Sonda–Mustvee Narrow-gauge railway passed through Tudu from 1926 to 1973. The main goal of this railway was to support timber industry, that was always the main industry in Tudu. Its construction boosted economic activity and general attractiveness of the region and closure created many problems for locals and made many plan their future somewhere else.

== See also ==
- Lake Tudu
