= Alavere =

Alavere may refer to several places in Estonia:

- Alavere, Harju County, village in Anija Parish, Harju County
- Alavere, Jõgeva County, village in Jõgeva Parish, Jõgeva County
- Alavere, Lääne-Viru County, village in Vinni Parish, Lääne-Viru County
