= Aasuvälja, Lääne-Viru County =

Village in Estonia

Aasuvälja
- Village
- Location in Estonia
- Coordinates: 59°19′44″N 26°36′34″E
- Country: Estonia
- County: Lääne-Viru County
- Municipality: Vinni Parish

Population (01.01.2010)
  - Total: 21

Aasuvälja is a village in Vinni Parish, Lääne-Viru County, in northeastern Estonia. Prior to the 2017 administrative reform of Estonian local governments, the village was located in Rägavere Parish.

It's located about 14km east of the town of Rakvere, just west of Ulvi, the administrative centre of the municipality. Aasuvälja has a population of 21 (as of 1 January 2010).

Aasuvälja is bordered by the Kunda River to the east and by the Tallinn–Narva (Tallinn–Saint Petersburg) railway. The nearest station is located 4km northeast in Viru-Kabala.
