= Roela =

Borough in Estonia

- Location within Estonia
- Coordinates: 59°10′13″N 26°36′1″E
- Country: Estonia
- County: Lääne-Viru County
- Parish: Vinni Parish
- Time zone: UTC+2 (EET)

Roela (German: Ruil) is a township (alevik) in Vinni Parish (Kirchspiel Finn before 1930), Lääne-Viru County (Wierland before 1919) in northeastern Estonia.

== History ==
Before the 13th century, there has been Stronghold labelled in the Estonian language "Roela linnamägi", but there has not been any closer archaeological examination as per data from 2010. It is presumed that Roela Linnamägi was created 6.-7 century AD. The remains of Stronghold are barely visible as very little remains on the hill. Roela was part of Viru-Jaagupi parish and hence independent county of Virumaa until Livonian Crusade reached Virumaa in 1219.

Roela was mentioned first time in writing in 1241 in Danish Census Book (Liber Census Damae) and as per data, Manor was established as "Roilse" and "Vettaerokae" did belong to Henric de Vspessil and in 1453, Roela Manor house was built instead of the Vettaerokae village. The Manor house itself was mentioned first time under the name Rogell.

In 1816, during the reign of Alexander I of Russia the process of abolition of serfdom in Livonia took place. Similar developments took place in Governorate of Estonia where Roela was located. Serfdom abolishment did not change the situation for the local peasants and the land around Roela was mostly owned by nobility, consisting of Baltic Germans, living in the Manor house.

In 1836, Roela village did have 36 farms within its limits.

1840 Roela manor was bought by Ferdinand von Wrangel who did hand it as a gift to his wife Elisabeth. Elisabeth died in Roela in 1850. Their son, Wilhelm von Wrangel, born in 1831 in Sitka, Alaska, did become later the owner of Roela manor. In 1894 this manor was passed on to his son Ferdinand von Wrangel.

1905 Russian Revolution did also reach Roela. Manor house properties were damaged during the insurgency.

After the Estonian War of Independence, Land Reform applied in 1920 redistributed most of the land belonging to the Manor house to the local peasant population.

In 2012, local medical point closed as Doctor Tõnis Nurk, did finish providing medical services to local population. Lack of local doctor was the main reason also why local pharmacy closed in 2015 for economical reasons. Locals started visiting doctor in Vinni/Pajusti area or in county centre Rakvere due to 2nd best option and it as more convenient for patients to purchase their medicines as well.

== Geography ==
Roela is located at the eastern edge of Pandivere Upland. The area has many springs, it is part of the Pandivere water protection area, and Kunda river starts from here at Uuemõisa area in Roela.

Next to Roela Manor house, there is a reservoir that was cleaned and shores were renovated in 2002.

== Administrative districts ==
Roela has now local parish/council sub service centre that serves following villages: Roela alevik, Alavere, Lepiku, Lähtse, Obja, Puka, Rasivere, Ristiküla, Rünga, Saara, Soonuka ja Tammiku.

== Economy ==
Traditionally, agriculture and forestry have provided the livelihood to the local community. During Soviet occupation, Roela was designated as sovkhoz. Several different industries were developed in the area, such as turkey farming. Turkey farming was one of the most profitable enterprises as Soviet Union paid good price for them. These industries are no longer present anymore as they disappeared with Soviet Union. Planned economy spared Roela region from the environmental destruction that some other areas were subject to in Virumaa.

In 21st century, there are several active farms in other fields such as beekeeping that also carry longer tradition in the area. Many of them are oriented to produce organic food due to the undisturbed and unspoiled ecological conditions in the past.

== Education ==
Local school was founded in 1822 however it was destroyed in fire and as per word of mouth it was rebuilt 1843. In 1875, there was 2 schools in Roela, municipal school and manor school. The municipal school burned down at the end of the century and construction of new building began in April 1900. 15th Oct. 1900 education continued in new building with 3 grades like all municipal schools at the time. 1908 manor school burned down and manor built new school where the manor servants children did receive education.

During Soviet occupation, Estonian education was reorganised as Soviet educational system was a very different from Estonian one. This meant that in 1944 Roela Not-complete Secondary school (Estonian: Roela Mittetäielik Keskkool) was created. In 1961 Roela 7 grade school was reorganized into Roela 8 grade school.

Current building for school was built in 01.09.1979 and 11.01.1980 Roela 8th grade school moved in despite the gym and assembly hall were not fully ready. In 01.09.1980 8th grade school became Roela Secondary school. 01.09.1996 school was downsized to Roela Basic school (Estonian: Roela Põhikool) and in 20.12.1999 it was named after Wrangell. Due to the oversized building and reduced number of pupils, school was once again reorganaized to Kindergarten-Basic school(Estonian: Roela Lasteaed-Põhikool) in 01.07.2011. The school had 75 pupils in 2009/2010. The number of pupils in school has been falling during the last decades. In 2010 11 pupils graduated and in 2020 6 pupils graduated. As per development plan for 2022-2027 period, the number of pupils has remained and is expected to be around 70 in the foreseeable future. Despite concerns about number of pupils in the future, no major changes is not being discussed to present educational structure.

== Culture ==
Roela has active non-profit organization MTÜ Roela Kodukant from 19 November 2004. The management has 5 members in 2023 and the aim of the organization is to develop life in Roela and the villages surrounding it. All related activities are only on volunteer basis. Traditional events are Spring fair, Jaanipäev, History conference and Christmas fair.

== Notable people ==
- Ferdinand von Wrangel (1797–1870), Baltic German explorer and seaman in the Imperial Russian Navy, did live his last years before his death in Roela Manor house
- Mihkel Jürna (1899–1973), Novelist and translator
- Imbi Valgemäe (1923–1960), Actress with a specialty of making children, especially boys, voice imitations
- Mihkel Juhkam (1884–1942), Politician, member of 1919 Estonian Constituent Assembly election and Minister of War in the government of August Rei in 1928-1929
