= Lake Tudu =

Lake in Estonia

- Tudu järv (Estonian)
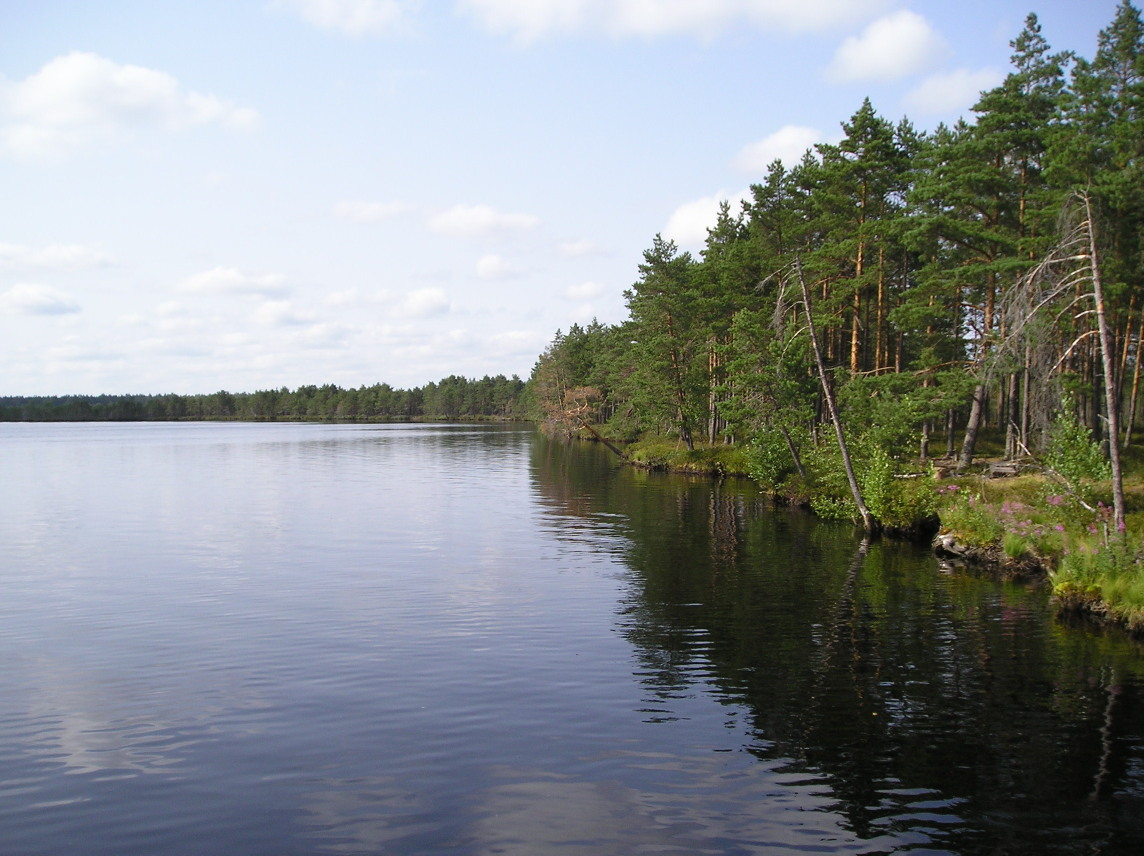

- Location within Estonia
- Location: Lääne-Viru County, Estonia
- Coordinates: 59°9′51″N 26°46′15″E
- Basin countries: Estonia
- Max. length: 710 meters (2,330 ft)
- Surface area: 26.2 hectares (65 acres)
- Average depth: 2.5 meters (8 ft 2 in)
- Max. depth: 5.0 meters (16.4 ft)
- Shore length^{1}: 1,970 meters (6,460 ft)
- Surface elevation: 82.0 meters (269.0 ft)
- ^{1} Shore length is not a well-defined measure.

Lake Tudu (Estonian: Tudu järv) is a lake in Estonia. It is located in the village of Suigu in Vinni Parish, Lääne-Viru County, 4.5 kilometers (2.8 mi) southwest of Tudu in the Järvesoo bog. The Tagajõgi flows out of Lake Tudu.

== Physical description ==
The lake has an area of 26.2 hectares (65 acres). The lake has an average depth of 2.5 meters (8 ft 2 in) and a maximum depth of 5.0 meters (16.4 ft). It is 710 meters (2,330 ft) long, and its shoreline measures 1,970 meters (6,460 ft). Its elevation is 82.0 meters (269.0 ft).

== See also ==
- List of lakes of Estonia
