= Rägavere Parish =

Former municipality of Estonia

Coordinates: 59°20′N 26°43′E

Rägavere Parish Rägavere vald
- Former municipality of Estonia
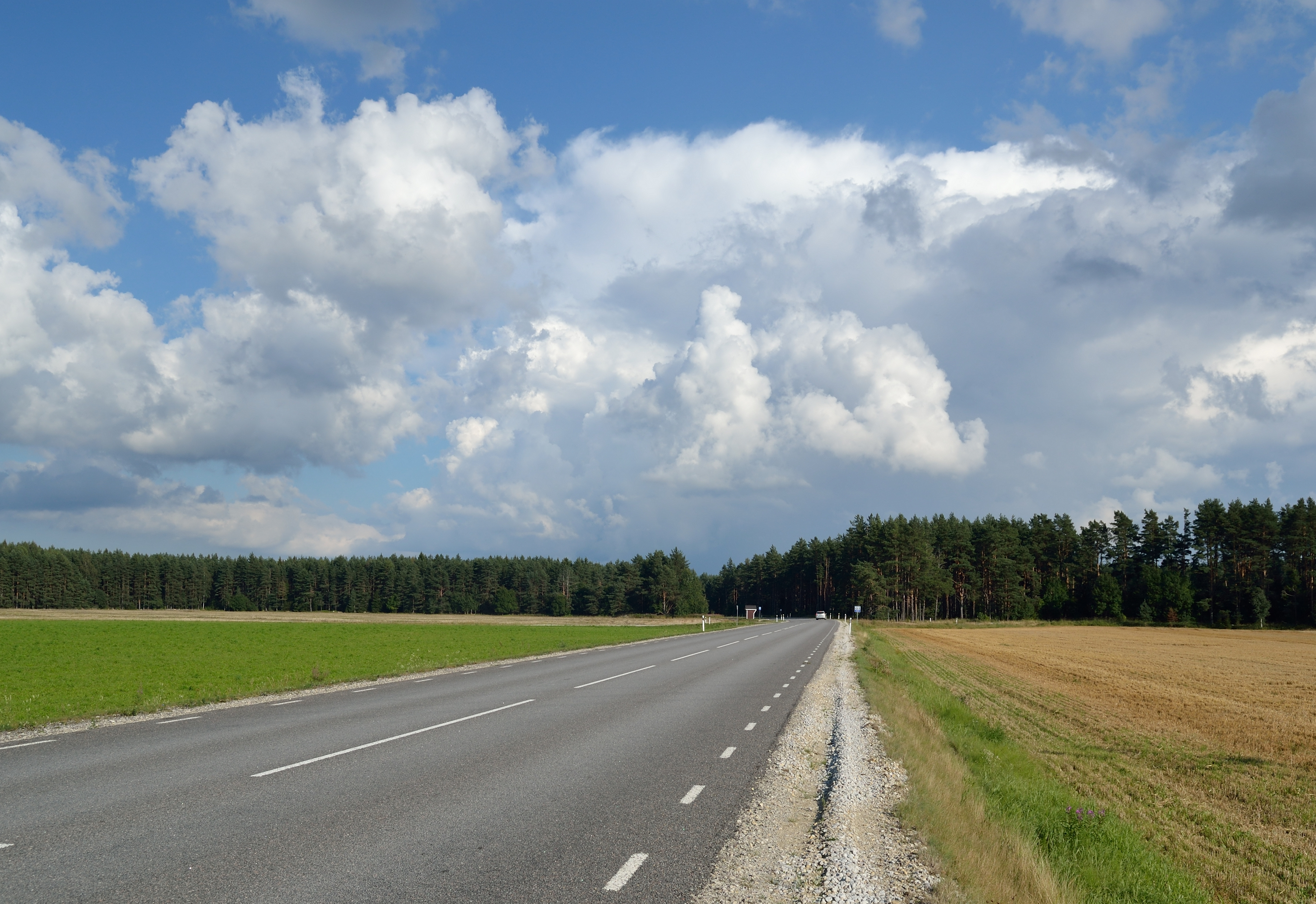
- Sämi–Sonda–Kiviõli road in the village of Viru-Kabala

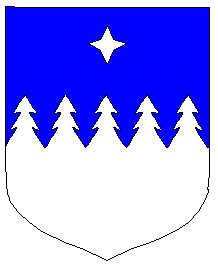
- Flag Coat of arms

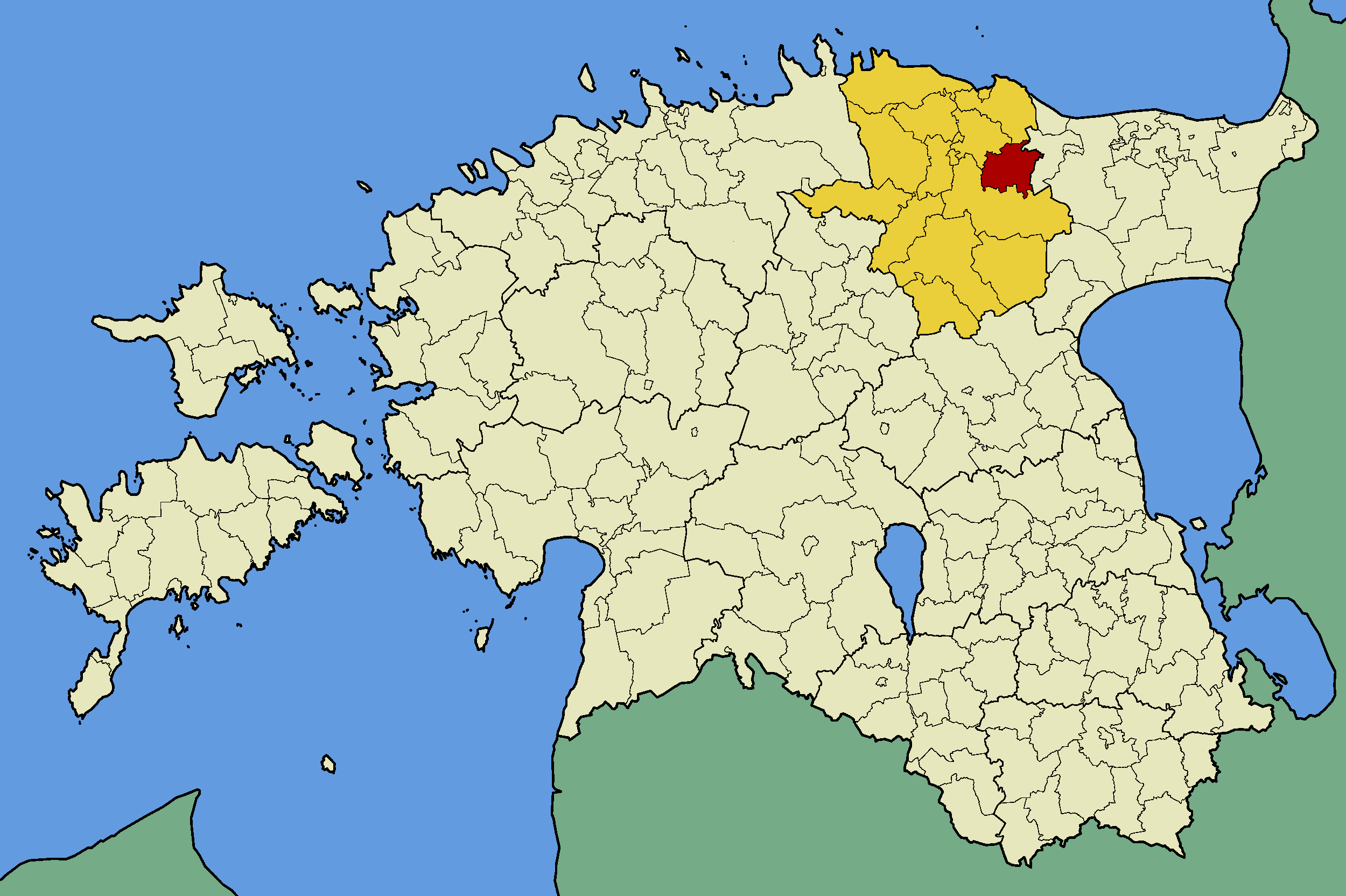
- Rägavere Parish within Lääne-Viru County.
- Country: Estonia
- County: Lääne-Viru County
- Administrative centre: Ulvi

Area
  - Total: 173.74 km^{2} (67.08 sq mi)

Population (2006)
  - Total: 993
  - Density: 5.72/km^{2} (14.8/sq mi)
- Website: www.ragaverevv.ee

Rägavere Parish (Estonian: Rägavere vald) was a rural municipality of Estonia, in Lääne-Viru County. It had a population of 993 (2006) and an area of 173.74 km².

== Villages ==
Aarla, Aasuvälja, Kantküla, Kõrma, Lavi, Männikvälja, Miila, Mõedaka, Nõmmise, Nurkse, Põlula, Sae, Uljaste, Ulvi, Viru-Kabala
