= Voore =

Voore may refer to:

- Voore, Jõgeva County, a village in Mustvee Parish
- Voore, Lääne-Viru County, a village in Vinni Parish
