= Inju =

Inju may refer to:

- Injuids or House of Inju, a 14th century Iranian dynasty
- Inju, Lääne-Viru County, Estonia, a village
- Inju: The Beast in the Shadow, a 2008 French film
