= Suigu Nature Reserve =

Nature reserve in Estonia

- Location within Estonia
- Location: Estonia
- Coordinates: 59°09′N 26°49′E
- Area: 83 hectares (210 acres)
- Established: 1976 (2009)

Suigu Nature Reserve is a nature reserve which is located in Lääne-Viru County, Estonia. The area of the nature reserve is 83 hectares (210 acres). The protected area was founded in 1976 to protect Suigu primeval forest.
