= Sofiya (ship) =

Passenger-cargo ship and naval gunboat

History

Imperial Russian Navy
- Name: Sofiya (Russian: София)
- Builder: Narva or Narva-Jõesuu
- Launched: 1857 or 1864
- Commissioned: 1914
- Decommissioned: 20 May 1919

Estonian Navy
- Name: Ilmatar
- Commissioned: 1920

Soviet Navy
- Name: Plussa (Russian: Плюсса)
- Commissioned: 13 August 1940
- Decommissioned: 22 July 1941

Nazi Germany
- Name: Ilmatar
- Commissioned: September 1941
- Decommissioned: August 1944

Soviet Union
- Name: Sofiya (Russian: София)
- Commissioned: 1946
- Decommissioned: 1950s
- Fate: Scrapped

General characteristics
- Class & type: Passenger ship, gunboat
- Displacement: 230 t (230 long tons)
- Length: 36.6–36.8 m (120 ft 1 in – 120 ft 9 in)
- Beam: 6.5 m (21 ft 4 in)
- Draft: 1.65–1.7 m (5 ft 5 in – 5 ft 7 in)
- Propulsion: Two 2-cylinder steam engines (200 hp, 150 kW)
- Speed: 9 kn (17 km/h; 10 mph)
- Range: 240 nmi (440 km; 280 mi) at 8 kn (15 km/h; 9.2 mph)
- Complement: 3 officers, 22 sailors
- Armament: One of the configurations: 2 × 75 or 76 mm guns or 2 × machine guns

Sofiya (Russian: София) was a passenger-cargo ship and naval vessel that served in the navies of the Russian Empire, the Republic of Estonia (as Ilmatar), the Soviet Union (as Plussa), and the Third Reich (under the Estonian name). It participated in both World Wars and the Estonian-Bolshevik War, operating on the waters of Lake Peipus. Repeatedly sunk and salvaged, it was ultimately scrapped in the 1950s.

== Construction and technical description ==
The steamship was built as a passenger-cargo vessel in 1864 in Narva or in 1857 in Hungenburg. The ship was from 36.6 to 36.8 meters long, with a beam of 6.5 meters and a draft of between 1.65 and 1.7 meters. Its displacement was 230 tons.

The propulsion system consisted of two compound steam engines with two cylinders, powered by a single wood-fired boiler with a fuel capacity of 50 m³. The engine produced 200 horsepower (150 kW), enabling a maximum speed of 9 knots (17 km/h; 10 mph). At 8 knots (15 km/h; 9.2 mph), the ship had a range of 240 nautical miles (440 km; 280 mi). During World War I, the ship was armed with two 75-millimetre (3 in) or 76 mm (3 in) guns and two machine guns. The crew consisted of 3 officers and 22 sailors.

== Service history ==
Under the name Sofiya, the ship operated from 1864 or 1868. In 1892, it underwent a refit. It was commissioned into the Imperial Russian Navy in August 1915. After arming, Sofiya joined the Chudskoe Flotilla on 9 September 1915, formally established six days later. The civilian crew underwent military training and was issued uniforms. Following the October Revolution, the ship was seized by the Bolsheviks on 26 October 1917.

Sofiya was scuttled by its crew on 20 May 1919, as the Red Army retreated from Raskopell under attack by the Estonian Navy. In 1920, the ship was salvaged by the Estonians or the White Russians and relocated to Tartu. Renamed Ilmatar, it served as a civilian vessel under the Ministry of Trade and Industry. It returned to military service in 1936, joining the Lake Peipus Gunboat Division.

Following the occupation of Estonia by the Soviet Union, Ilmatar was taken over by the Soviet Navy on 13 August 1940. It served as a training vessel under its Estonian name until 22 March 1941, when it was renamed Plussa (likely after the Plyussa river). On 30 June 1941, it was reclassified as a gunboat, fitted with two 45 mm (2 in) guns and two machine guns. One month after Germany's invasion of the Soviet Union, on 22 July 1941, the ship was damaged by the Luftwaffe at Mustvee. Alongside the Issa, also damaged in the attack, it was scuttled by its crew near the mouth of the Rannapungerja river. In September 1941, the Germans salvaged it and used it as Ilmatar for troop transport on Lake Peipus. It was sunk by Soviet aircraft on the Emajõgi river in August 1944.

The ship was salvaged postwar in 1946. Converted into a non-powered barge and renamed Sofiya, it was used for transport in Pskov. It was scrapped in the mid-1950s.

== Bibliography ==
- Vercamer, Arvo Lennart (2014). "Pole bitwy: jezioro Pejpus od 5000 lat przed naszą erą do 1945 roku" [Battlefield: Lake Peipus from 5000 BCE to 1945]. Okręty Wojenne (in Polish). 1 (123). Tarnowskie Góry. ISSN 1231-014X.
- Vercamer, Arvo Lennart (2014). "Pole bitwy: jezioro Pejpus od 5000 lat przed naszą erą do 1945 roku" [Battlefield: Lake Peipus from 5000 BCE to 1945]. Okręty Wojenne (in Polish). 2 (124). Tarnowskie Góry. ISSN 1231-014X.
