= Rasivere =

Rasivere may refer to several places in Estonia:

- Rasivere, Harju County, village in Anija Parish, Harju County
- Rasivere, Lääne-Viru County, village in Vinni Parish, Lääne-Viru County
