= Maetsma =

Village in Estonia

Coordinates: 59°00′N 26°54′E

- Village
- Interactive map of Maetsma
- Country: Estonia
- County: Jõgeva County
- Parish: Mustvee Parish

Population (2021)
  - Total: 50
- Time zone: UTC+2 (EET)
  - Summer (DST): UTC+3 (EEST)

Maetsma is a village in Mustvee Parish, Jõgeva County in northeastern Estonia.

== History ==
First time Maetsma was mentioned in written document was in 1599. This was in 2nd Duchy of Livonia landrevision and village was called in Polish Madytuzma. Written records indicate that village had many names during different times. In 1601 Madditüßma, 1624 Mayatoußma, 1758 Maiatusma and 1811 Maitzma. The village was in 1599 under Dorpat Voivodeship, in district (starostwo) of Lais (Laiuse) and managed by Roela Manor.

Maetsma has been historically part of Torma Parish and from 1920 is became part of Avinurme Parish (Kirchspiel Awinorm before 1930).

Maetsma had a school 1860–1928. Founding of school made Maetsma the center of culture and education in Avinurme Parish. There was a choir, concert band, theatrical troupe and school building also contained public library. School had following number of pupils: 1863 – 29 boys ja 31 girls so 60 pupils; 1864 – 73 pupils; 1869 – 105 pupils, 1916 – 85 pupils. Schools territory was already created on local Manor map, created 1848–53 so it has been presumed that the creation of school was on hold due to lack of proper staff. In 28.09.1928 there was a fire in the school on Sunday early morning. Fire started on 2nd floor. Locals did rally for fire fighting and they succeeded saving the teachers personal possessions. With the arrival of local fire brigade also surrounding buildings were saved from serious damage. After fire, school was moved to temporary location of Avinurme town hall that is close to the village. One year after relocation, Maetsma school was incorporated to Avinurme school, ending its time as a Primary school with four grades. Avinurme school was officially expanded from being 4 grade school to 6 grade school. The school building itself was never restored. Present day you can see at the location of the school a memorial stone with engraving.

After construction of community house in early 20th century to Avinurme, the center of culture and education in Parish did move away from Maetsma. During further developments in the second half of 20th century, Maetsma became practically part of Avinurme.

== Demographics ==
In 2021 it was estimated that village has 50 residents.
