= Kupreanof Mountain =

Mountain in Kodiak Island Borough, Alaska

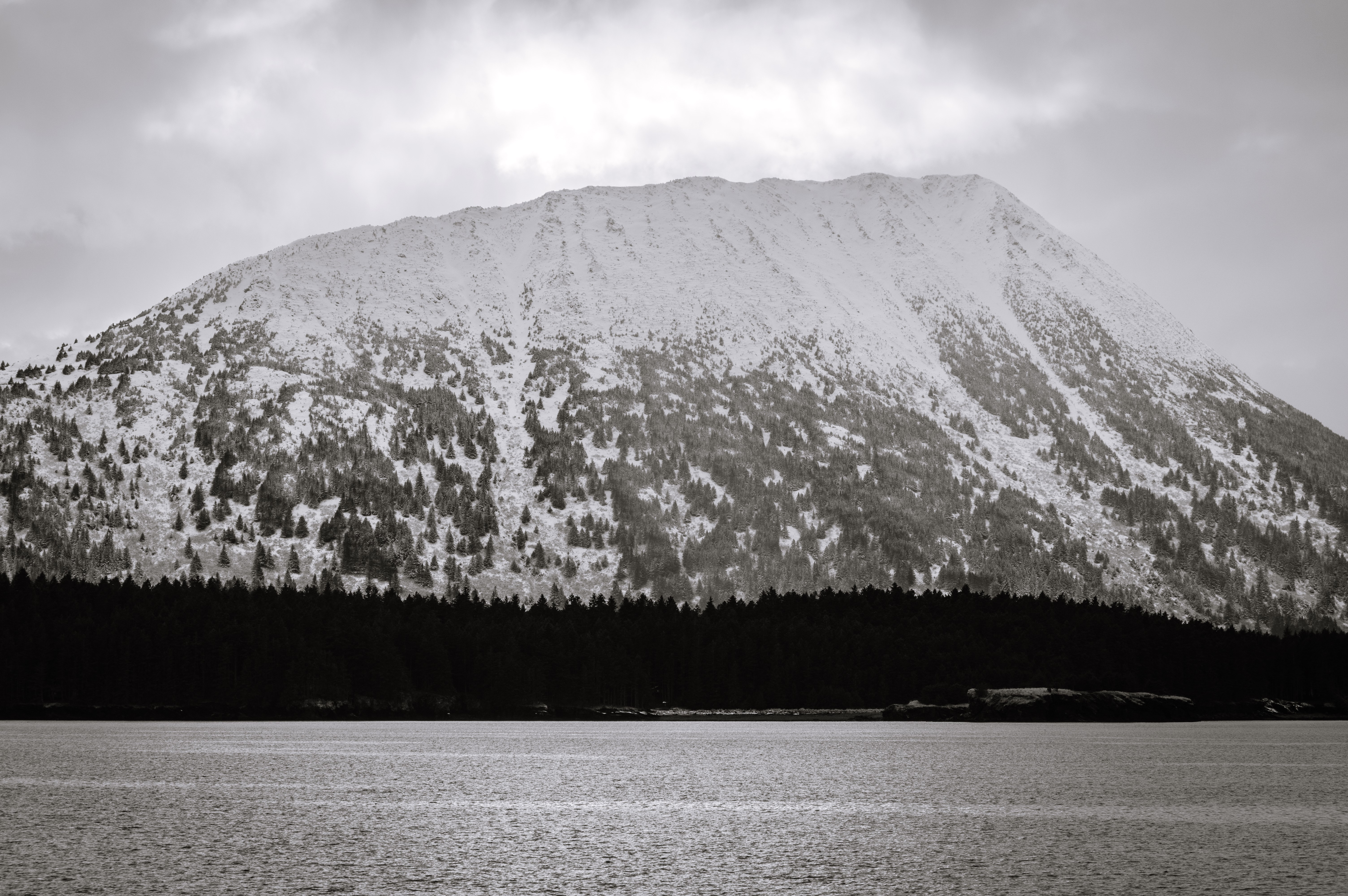
- North aspect

Highest point
- Elevation: 2,440 ft (744 m)
- Prominence: 1,890 ft (576 m)
- Parent peak: Peak 2479
- Isolation: 3.51 mi (5.65 km)
- Coordinates: 57°55′58″N 153°06′05″W

Naming
- Etymology: Ivan Kupreyanov

Geography
- Location within Alaska
- Country: United States
- State: Alaska
- Borough: Kodiak Island Borough
- Parent range: Kodiak Archipelago
- Topo map: USGS Kodiak D-4

Kupreanof Mountain is a 2,440-foot-elevation (744-meter) summit in Alaska.

== Description ==
Kupreanof Mountain is located 28 miles (45 km) northwest of Kodiak on the Kupreanof Peninsula along the north coast of Kodiak Island. Precipitation runoff from the mountain drains north into Dry Spruce Bay and south to Viekoda Bay. Topographic relief is significant as the mountain rises over 2,400 feet (732 meters) above tidewater at Dry Spruce Bay in approximately 0.7 miles (1.1 km). The mountain's name was applied in 1909 by the United States Coast and Geodetic Survey and the toponym was officially adopted in 1909 by the United States Board on Geographic Names. The name is derived from Kupreanof Island which in turn is named after Ivan Kupreyanov (1794–1857).

== Climate ==
According to the Köppen climate classification system, Kupreanof Mountain is located in a subpolar oceanic climate zone with cold, snowy winters, and cool summers. Weather systems coming off the North Pacific are forced upwards by the mountains (orographic lift), causing heavy precipitation in the form of rainfall and snowfall. Winter temperatures can drop to 0 °F with wind chill factors below −10 °F.

== See also ==
- List of mountain peaks of Alaska
- Geography of Alaska
