= Suigu =

Suigu may refer to several places in Estonia:

- Suigu, Lääne-Viru County, village in Vinni Parish, Lääne-Viru County
- Suigu, Pärnu County, village in Tori Parish, Pärnu County
