= Aruvälja =

Aruvälja may refer to several places in Estonia:

- Aruvälja, Ida-Viru County, village in Lüganuse Parish, Ida-Viru County
- Aruvälja, Lääne-Viru County, village in Vinni Parish, Lääne-Viru County
- Aruvälja, Pärnu County, village in Pärnu, Pärnu County
