= Ristiküla =

Ristiküla may refer to several places in Estonia:

- Ristiküla, Lääne-Viru County, village in Vinni Parish, Lääne-Viru County
- Ristiküla, Pärnu County, village in Saarde Parish, Pärnu County

== See also ==
- Risti (disambiguation)
