= Tagajõgi =

River in Estonia

Location
- Country: Estonia

Physical characteristics
- Mouth: Rannapungerja River
  - coordinates: 59°01′18″N 27°06′14″E
- Length: 48.7 km (30.3 mi)
- Basin size: 256.6 km^{2} (99.1 sq mi)

The Tagajõgi is a river in Ida-Viru and Lääne-Viru counties, Estonia. The river is 48.7 km long, and its basin size is 256.6 km^{2}. It runs from Lake Tudu into the Rannapungerja River.

Trout live in the river.
