= Ferdinand von Wrangel =

Baltic German explorer and Russian admiral (1797–1870)

Baron Ferdinand von Wrangel
- Фердинанд Врангель
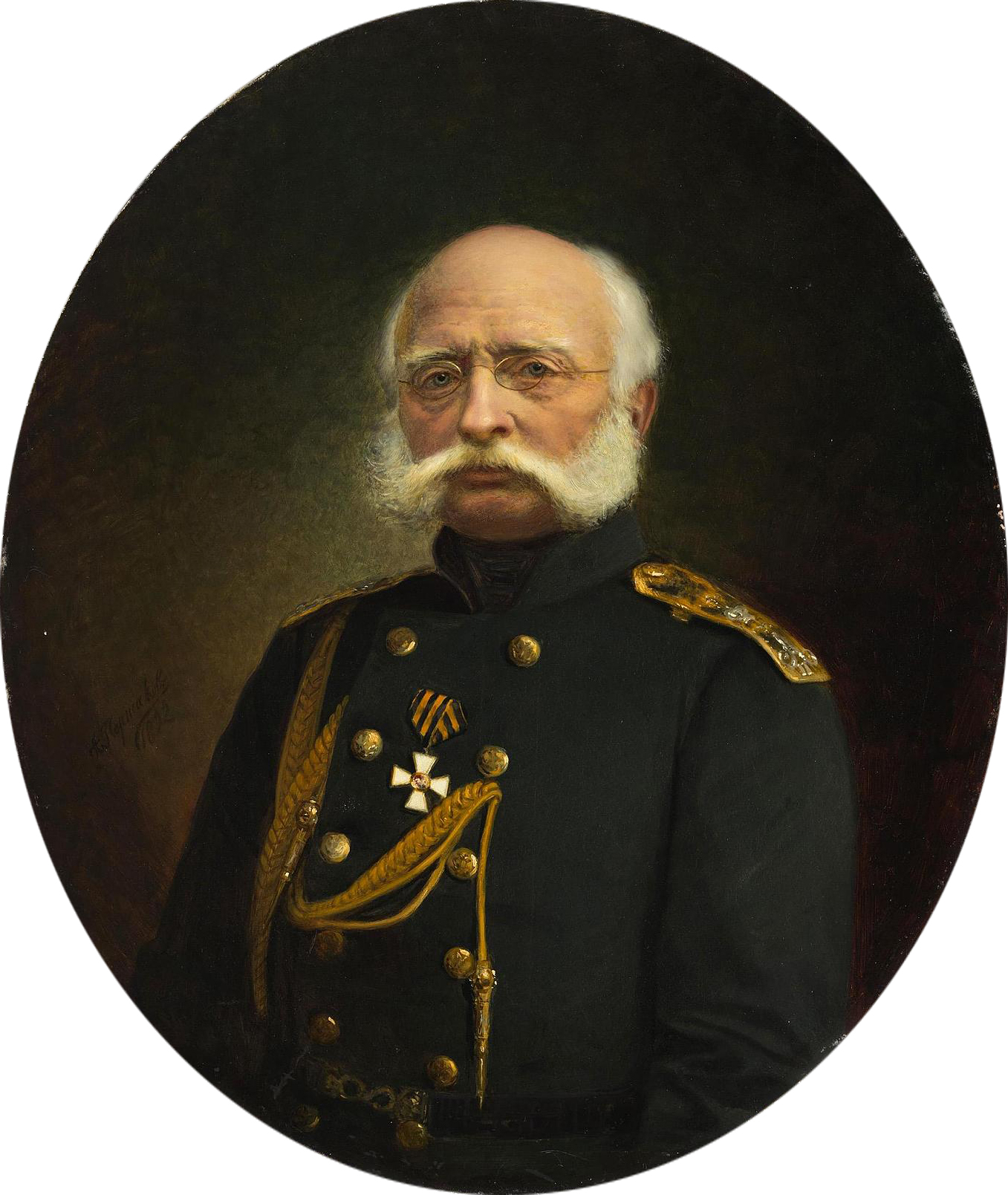
- Portrait by Aleksandr Pershakov (1892)

6th Governor of Russian America
- In office 1 June 1830 – 29 October 1835
- Preceded by: Pyotr Yegorovich Chistyakov
- Succeeded by: Ivan Kupreyanov

Minister of the Navy
- In office 18 May 1855 – 27 July 1857
- Preceded by: Alexander Menshikov
- Succeeded by: Nikolay Metlin

Personal details
- Born: 29 December 1797 Pskov, Russian Empire
- Died: 25 May 1870 (aged 72) Dorpat, Russian Empire
- Spouse: Elisabeth Teodora Natalia Karolina de Rossillon
- Children: 5

Military service
- Allegiance: Russia
- Branch/service: Imperial Russian Navy; Imperial Russian Army
- Years of service: 1815–1864
- Rank: Admiral; Adjutant General
- Battles/wars: Crimean War

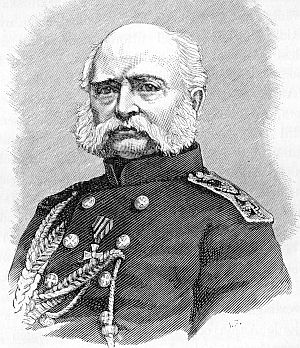
Portrait by Ida Falander

Baron Ferdinand Friedrich Georg Ludwig von Wrangel (Note: In English texts, Wrangel is sometimes spelled Vrangel, a transliteration from Russian, or Wrangell.) (Russian: Фердинанд Петрович Врангель, romanized: Ferdinand Petrovich Vrangel; 9 January 1797 [O.S. 29 December 1796] – 6 June [O.S. 25 May] 1870) was a Russian statesman, naval officer and explorer of Baltic German origin. He was also an honorary member of the Saint Petersburg Academy of Sciences and a founder of the Russian Geographic Society. He is best known as the chief manager of the Russian-American Company and the governor of Russian settlements in Alaska.

== Early life and education ==
Wrangel was born in Pskov, into the Baltic German nobility of the Wrangel family and was a distant nephew of Generalfeldmarschall Friedrich von Wrangel.

He graduated from the Naval Cadets College in 1815. He participated in Vasily Golovnin's world cruise on the ship Kamchatka in 1817–1819 and belonged to the cohort of Baltic-German navigators who were instrumental in Imperial Russia's maritime explorations.

== Career ==
=== Kolymskaya expedition ===
He was appointed in 1820 to command the Kolymskaya expedition to explore the Russian polar seas. Sailing from St. Petersburg, he arrived at Nizhnekolymsk on 2 November 1820, and early in 1821 journeyed to Cape Shelagskiy on sledges drawn by dogs. He sailed afterward up Kolyma River, advancing about 125 miles into the interior, through territory inhabited by the Yakuts. On 10 March 1822, he resumed his journey northward, and traveled 46 days on the ice, reaching 72° 2' north latitude. He left Nizhnekolymsk on 1 November 1823, and returned to St. Petersburg on 15 August 1824.

He established that north of the Kolyma River and Cape Shelagsky there was an open sea, not dry land, as people thought. Together with Fyodor Matyushkin and P. Kuzmin, Wrangel described the Siberian coastline from the Indigirka River to the Kolyuchinskaya Bay in the Chukchi Sea. (See Northeast Passage.) His expedition made a valuable research in glaciology, geomagnetics, and climatology and also collected data about natural resources and native population of that remote area.

=== Krotky world voyage ===
Having been promoted to commander, Wrangel led the Russian world voyage on the ship Krotky in 1825–1827. That voyage spent 8 days at Nuku Hiva, leaving when it was ambushed by local people. It also called at Hawai'i.

=== Governor of Russian Alaska ===
He was appointed chief manager of the Russian-American Company in 1829, effectively governor of its settlements in North America (present day Alaska). Wrangel was the first of a series of bachelor appointees to the office of governor who had to find a wife before assuming the duties in America, the Russian American Company rules having been changed in 1829. Prior to his departure for Russia's American colonies, he was married to Elisabeth Theodora Natalie Karoline de Rossillon, daughter of Baron Wilhelm de Rossillon.

He traveled to his post early in 1829, by way of Siberia and Kamchatka. After thoroughly reforming the administration, he introduced the cultivation of the potato, opened and regulated the working of several mines, and urged upon the home government the organization of a fur company. He promoted investment, and sent out missionaries. He began a survey of the country, opened roads, built bridges and government buildings. He made geographical and ethnographical observations, which he embodied in a memoir to the navy department. Recalled in 1834, he returned by way of Mexico and the United States, where he visited several cities.

=== Admiral ===
Wrangel was promoted to rear admiral in 1837, and made director of the ship-timber department in the navy office, which he held for twelve years. He became vice-admiral in 1847, but resigned in 1849, and temporarily severed his connection with the navy to assume the presidency of the newly reorganized Russian-American Company. Wrangel had been a member of the board of directors of the Russian-American Company from 1840 to 1849.

In 1854 he re-entered active service and was made chief director of the hydrographical department of the navy He was the Minister of the Navy 1855–1857.

=== Retirement and death ===
Wrangel retired in 1864. He opposed the sale of Alaska to the United States in 1867. Wrangel wrote the book Journey along the northern coastline of Siberia and the Arctic Ocean and other books about the peoples of northwestern America.

He lived in his last years in Ruil (Roela in Estonian) in the eastern part of Estonia. The manor was bought by him in 1840 and he gave it to his wife as a gift. Wrangel died in Dorpat, Livonia. His final resting place is in Viru-Jaagupi cemetery.

== Writings ==
An account of the physical observations during his first journey was published in German (Berlin, 1827), and also in German extracts from Wrangel's journals, Reise längs der Nordküste von Sibirien und auf dem Eismeere in den Jahren 1820-1824 (2 vols., Berlin, 1839), which was translated into English as Wrangell's Expedition to the Polar Sea (2 vols., London, 1840). The complete report of the expedition appeared as "Puteshestvie po severnym beregam Sibiri, po Ledovitomu Moryu, sovershennoe v 1820, 1821, 1822, 1823 i 1824 godakh" (2 vols., St. Petersburg, 1841), and was translated into French with notes by Prince Galitzin, under the title Voyage sur les côtes septentrionales de la Sibérie et de la mer glaciale (2 vols., 1841). From the French version of the complete report an English one was made under the title A Journey on the Northern Coast of Siberia and the Icy Sea (2 vols., London, 1841). The book influenced Charles Darwin's thinking on animal navigation, leading him to propose that humans and animals possess an innate ability for dead reckoning. Darwin wrote:

With regard to the question of the means by which animals find their way home from a long distance, a striking account, in relation to man, will be found in the English translation of the Expedition to North Siberia, by Von Wrangell. He there describes the wonderful manner in which the natives kept a true course towards a particular spot, whilst passing for a long distance through hummocky ice, with incessant changes of direction, and with no guide in the heavens or on the frozen sea. He states (but I quote only from memory of many years standing) that he, an experienced surveyor, and using a compass, failed to do that which these savages easily effected. Yet no one will suppose that they possessed any special sense which is quite absent in us. We must bear in mind that neither a compass, nor the north star, nor any other such sign, suffices to guide a man to a particular spot through an intricate country, or through hummocky ice, when many deviations from a straight course are inevitable, unless the deviations are allowed for, or a sort of "dead reckoning" is kept.

Wrangel also published:

- Ocherk puti iz Sitki v Sankt-Peterburg (Report of Travel from Sitka to St. Petersburg) (1836)
  - French translation: Journal de voyage de Sitka à Saint Pétersbourg (Paris, 1836)
  - English translation prepared from the French: Journal of a Voyage from Sitka to St. Petersburg (London, 1837)
- Nachrichten über die Russischen Besitzungen an der Nordwestküste America's (2 vols., St. Petersburg, 1839)
  - French translation: Renseignements statistiques et ethnographiques sur les possessions Russes de la côte Nord-Ouest de l'Amérique (Paris, 1839)
  - English translation: Statistical and Ethnographical Notices on the Russian Possessions in North America (London, 1841)

== Ancestry and legacy ==
Wrangel's descendants Peter-Friedrich Krienitz and Hermann von Wrangell, from Germany visited Ferdinand von Wrangel's last home and grave in Roela first in 1990. After the Estonian Restoration of Independence in 1991, they together created the Fondation von Wrangell on his behalf - a society to assist Estonian and Latvian schools in 1992. They also began to assist Estonian legal professionals to transition to the European legal system by creating Forum Academicum in Roela.

Ferdinand von Wrangel's 200th birthday (29th Dec. 1996 in the old calendar and 1997 January 10 by the new calendar), was celebrated with scientific conferences, a pipe organ concert and exhibitions in the University of Tartu, the Estonian Maritime Museum and in Saint Petersburg. A series of notebooks „FvW in itinere“ was released by the Fondation von Wrangelli in Estonian, Russian and German to introduce his scientific legacy. Over the next 10 years his birthday was celebrated in Tartu with scientific presentations, coffee and kringel.

Pro Scola opened opportunity for Lääne-Virumaa language teachers to learn more about Germany and also gave large input extending Rakvere Reaalgümnaasium library with English and German books. Pro Scola ceased its activities in 2005 with final seminaries in Rakvere, Tartu and in Latvia.

== Namesakes ==
Coat of Arms of Ferdinand von Wrangel

- Wrangel Island, the arctic island north of Chukotka, named by Thomas Long after him. Wrangel had noticed swarms of birds flying north, and, questioning the native population, he determined that there must be an undiscovered island in the Arctic Ocean. He searched for it on the Kolymskaya expedition, but failed to find it.
- Wrangell Island, an island in the Alexander Archipelago, off the coast of Alaska
  - Wrangell, Alaska, a city on Wrangell Island and one of the oldest non-native settlements in Alaska
    - Fort Wrangel, a US Army base at Wrangell, originally Fort Stikine when under British control
  - Wrangell Airport, an airport near Wrangell, Alaska
  - Wrangell-Petersburg Census Area a census area containing Wrangell Island.
- Wrangell Narrows, a winding channel in the Alexander Archipelago
- Cape Wrangell of Attu Island, the westernmost point of Alaska (and the United States)
- Mount Wrangell, a volcano in Alaska
  - Wrangell Volcanic Field, named after Mount Wrangell
  - Wrangell Mountains, named after Mount Wrangell
  - USS Wrangell (AE-12), named after Mount Wrangell
  - Wrangell-St. Elias National Park and Preserve, named after Wrangell mountains
- Wrangellia, a geologic terrane of Southeast Alaska

== See also ==
- List of Baltic German explorers

== Sources ==
- "Врангель, Фердинанд Петрович" . Brockhaus and Efron Encyclopedic Dictionary (in Russian). 1906.

Government offices
Preceded by Pyotr Yegorovich Chistyakov	Governor of Russian Colonies in America; 1830–1835	Succeeded by Ivan Kupreyanov
