= Saara, Estonia =

Village in Estonia

Coordinates: 59°09′01″N 26°35′54″E

Saara
- Village
- Interactive map of Saara
- Country: Estonia
- County: Lääne-Viru County
- Parish: Vinni Parish
- Time zone: UTC+2 (EET)
  - Summer (DST): UTC+3 (EEST)

Saara is a village in Vinni Parish, Lääne-Viru County, in northeastern Estonia.
