= Tammiku, Vinni Parish =

Village in Estonia

Coordinates: 59°11′N 26°39′E

Tammiku
- Village
- Interactive map of Tammiku
- Country: Estonia
- County: Lääne-Viru County
- Parish: Vinni Parish
- Time zone: UTC+2 (EET)
  - Summer (DST): UTC+3 (EEST)

Tammiku is a village in Vinni Parish, Lääne-Viru County, in northeastern Estonia.

== Name ==
Tammiku was attested in written sources as Pamicus in 1241, Pammekule in 1345, and Tamyckass in 1545. According to the historian Paul Johansen, the initial P in the earliest attestations should be read as a T. In the 17th century, the village disappeared and Tammik manor was built, and then in 1765 the surrounding area became a village again. Assuming that the earliest attestations actually began with T, the name (in the genitive case) comes from the common noun tammik 'oak forest', referring to the local vegetation.
