= Sae, Lääne-Viru County =

Village in Estonia

Coordinates: 59°16′N 26°38′E

Sae
- Village
- Interactive map of Sae
- Country: Estonia
- County: Lääne-Viru County
- Parish: Vinni Parish
- Time zone: UTC+2 (EET)
  - Summer (DST): UTC+3 (EEST)

Sae is a village in Vinni Parish, Lääne-Viru County, in northeastern Estonia. Prior to the 2017 administrative reform of Estonian local governments, the village was located in Rägavere Parish.
