= Kakumäe, Lääne-Viru County =

Village in Estonia

Coordinates: 59°27′N 24°35′E

Kakumäe
- Village
- Interactive map of Kakumäe
- Country: Estonia
- County: Lääne-Viru County
- Parish: Vinni Parish
- Time zone: UTC+2 (EET)
  - Summer (DST): UTC+3 (EEST)

Kakumäe is a village in Vinni Parish, Lääne-Viru County, in northeastern Estonia.
