= Inju, Lääne-Viru County =

Village in Estonia

Inju
- Village
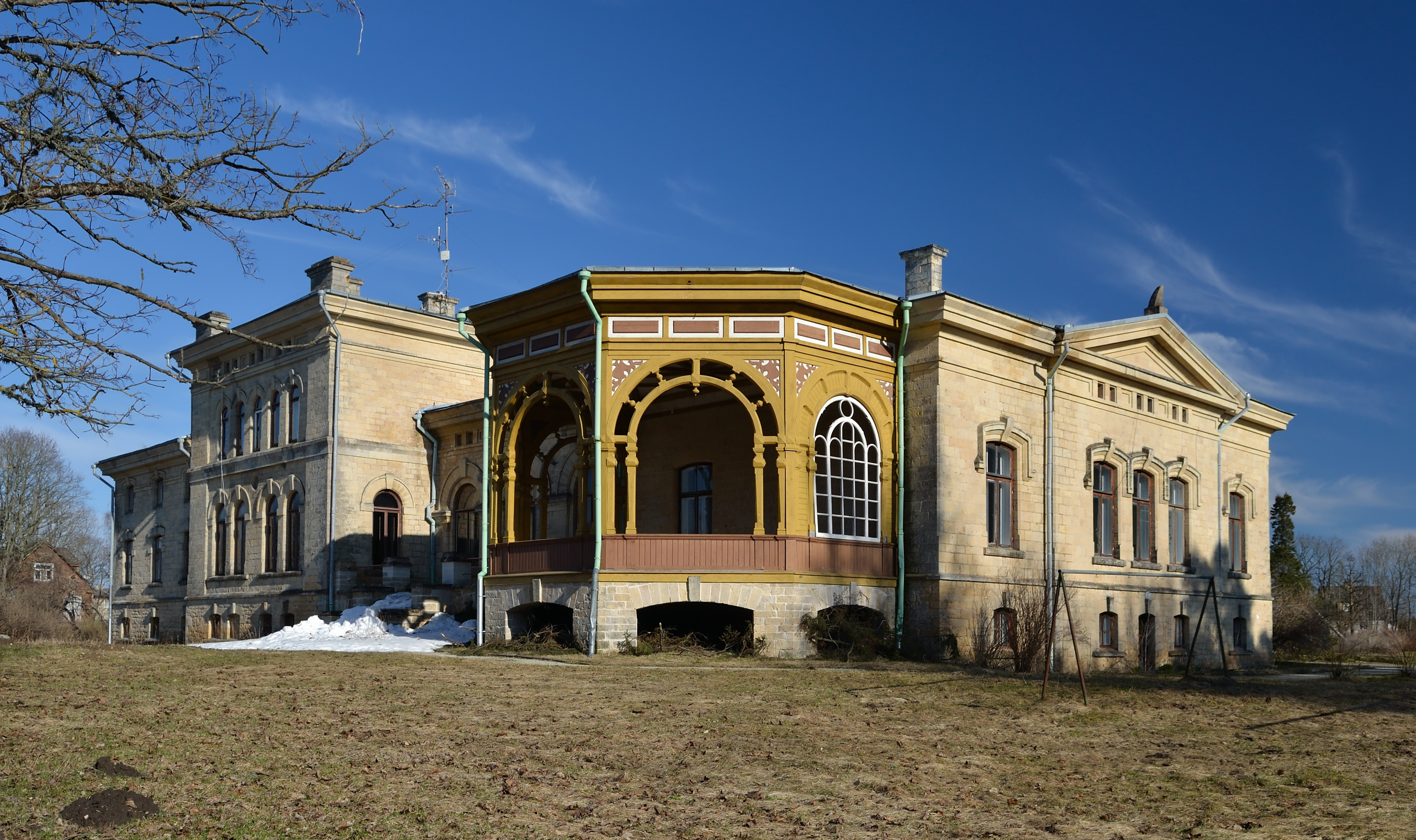
- Inju manor

- Location in Estonia
- Coordinates: 59°16′N 26°22′E
- Country: Estonia
- County: Lääne-Viru County
- Parish: Vinni Parish
- Time zone: UTC+2 (EET)
  - Summer (DST): UTC+3 (EEST)

Inju is a village in Vinni Parish, Lääne-Viru County, Estonia. It is 4 km south west of Pajusti and 12 km south of Rakvere.

== Inju manor ==
The history of Inju manor (German: Innis) goes back to at least 1520. In 1894 the current building was erected, probably designed by architect Rudolf von Engelhardt. It is one of the most characteristic examples of neo-Renaissance manor house architecture in Estonia.

== See also ==
- List of palaces and manor houses in Estonia
