= Võhu =

Village in Estonia

Coordinates: 59°13′N 26°35′E

- Village
- Interactive map of Võhu
- Country: Estonia
- County: Lääne-Viru County
- Parish: Vinni Parish
- Time zone: UTC+2 (EET)
  - Summer (DST): UTC+3 (EEST)

Võhu is a village in Vinni Parish, Lääne-Viru County, in northeastern Estonia.

It is situated within the historical region of Virumaa and forms part of Estonia’s administrative division following the municipal reform of 2017. Võhu lies in a rural setting characterized by agricultural landscapes, small forests, and scattered homesteads. The village is part of the Lääne-Viru County administrative area, which is known for its mixed economy of farming, forestry, and small-scale industry. Local governance is provided by Vinni Parish authorities, who oversee municipal services and development projects for Võhu and neighbouring settlements. Historically, Võhu has been recorded in regional land registries and maps dating back to the late 19th and early 20th centuries. While small in population, the village reflects the cultural and architectural traditions of the region, with some farmsteads preserving features of traditional Estonian rural architecture. Transport connections to Võhu are primarily via local roads linking it to nearby villages and to the parish centre of Pajusti. The nearest larger urban area is the county capital, Rakvere, which serves as a hub for commerce, education, and healthcare.
