= Mihkel Jürna =

Estonian writer and translator

Mihkel Jürna (17 September 1899 – 5 December 1972, Tallinn) was an Estonian writer and translator.

He was born in Soonuka in present-day Vinni Parish. He attended schools in Kiltsi and Väike-Maarja. From 1917 until 1923 he studied at the Hugo Treffner Gymnasium in Tartu. After graduation, he entered the Faculty of Law of the University of Tartu and graduated in 1926. From 1934 until 1937 he studied at the university's Faculty of Medicine.

He died in 1972 and is buried at Metsakalmistu Cemetery in Tallinn.

== Selected works ==
- 1921: play Idee
- 1925: collections Sang and Bumerang (co-authored with Juhan Schütz (Sütiste) and Erni Hiir)
- 1927: collection of novellas Tavalised
- 1929: collection of novellas Üks armastus
- 1932: collection of novellas Ärigeenius
- 1972: collection Tavalised
