= Vinni, Estonia =

Borough in Lääne-Viru County, Estonia

Vinni
- Small borough
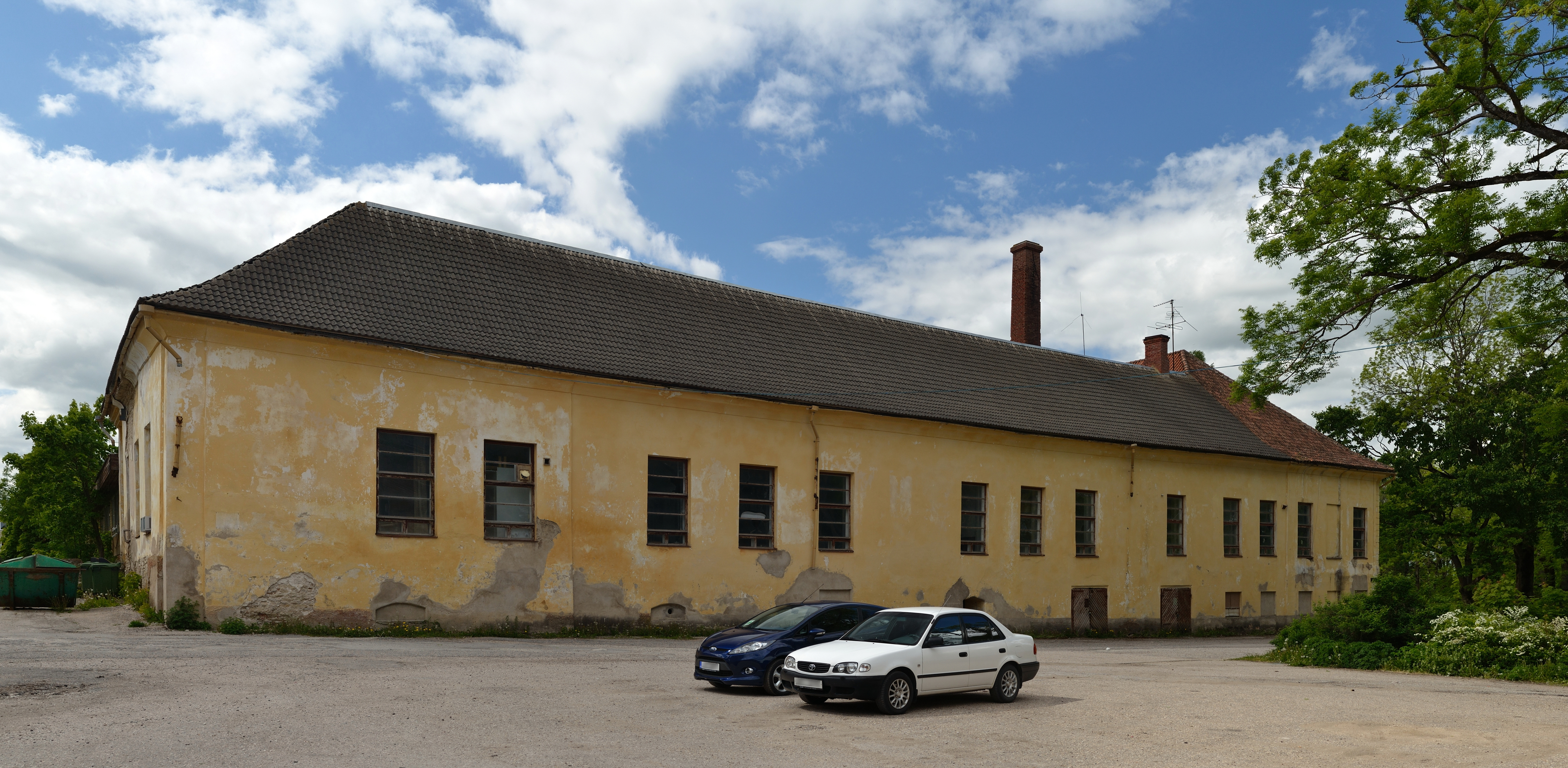
- Vinni Manor

- Location in Estonia
- Coordinates: 59°17′40″N 26°25′52″E
- Country: Estonia
- County: Lääne-Viru County
- Municipality: Vinni Parish

Area
  - Total: 5 km^{2} (1.9 sq mi)

Population (31.12.2021)
  - Total: 882
  - Density: 180/km^{2} (460/sq mi)

Ethnicity (2021)
  - estonians: 89.3%
  - other: 10.7%

Vinni (German: Finn) is a borough in Vinni Parish, Lääne-Viru County, Estonia.

The borough is located 7 kilometers southeast of Rakvere, and a kilometer northeast of Pajusti, the administrative center of the parish.

As of December 31, 2021, the borough has a population of 882.

== History ==
The last battle on Estonian soil during the Great Northern War took place on the field of Vinni on August 15, 1708. This resulted in the withdrawal of the remaining Swedish forces to Tallinn and Pärnu.

== Demographics ==
Year	Total	Estonians	%
1959	393	-	-
1970	780	-	-
1979	884	-	-
2000	1054	847	80.4
2011	927	806	87.5
2021	882	785	89.3
