= Kadila =

Village in Estonia

Coordinates: 59°13′N 26°20′E

- Village
- Interactive map of Kadila
- Country: Estonia
- County: Lääne-Viru County
- Parish: Vinni Parish
- Time zone: UTC+2 (EET)
  - Summer (DST): UTC+3 (EEST)

Kadila is a village in Vinni Parish, Lääne-Viru County, in northeastern Estonia.
