= Obja =

Village in Estonia

Coordinates: 59°11′N 26°38′E

- Village
- Interactive map of Obja
- Country: Estonia
- County: Lääne-Viru County
- Parish: Vinni Parish
- Time zone: UTC+2 (EET)
  - Summer (DST): UTC+3 (EEST)

Obja is a village in Vinni Parish, Lääne-Viru County, in northeastern Estonia.
