= Risti =

Risti may refer to:

- Risti, Nepal, village development committee in Tanahu District, Gandaki Zone, Nepal
- Risti, Estonia, small borough in Lääne-Nigula Parish, Lääne County, Estonia
  - Risti Parish, former municipality in Estonia
- Risti, Hiiu County, village in Hiiumaa Parish, Hiiu County, Estonia

== See also ==
- Harju-Risti, village in Lääne-Harju Parish, Harju County, Estonia
- Ristiküla (disambiguation)
