= Lavi, Estonia =

Village in Estonia

Coordinates: 59°18′N 26°38′E

Lavi
- Village
- Interactive map of Lavi
- Country: Estonia
- County: Lääne-Viru County
- Parish: Vinni Parish

Population
  - Total: 42
- Time zone: UTC+2 (EET)
  - Summer (DST): UTC+3 (EEST)

Lavi is a village in Vinni Parish, Lääne-Viru County, in northeastern Estonia. Prior to the 2017 administrative reform of Estonian local governments, the village was located in Rägavere Parish.
