= August Traksmaa =

Estonian general

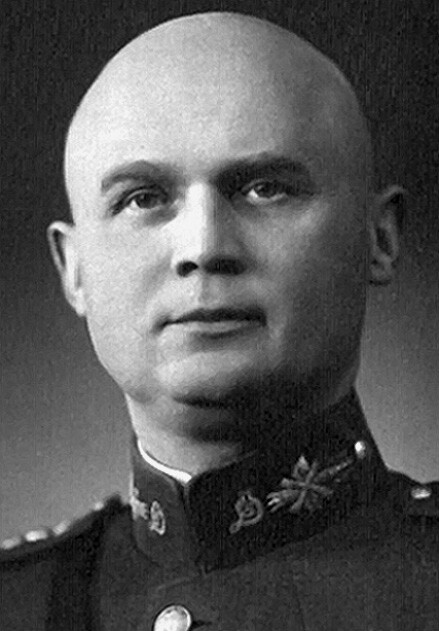
August Traksmaa

August Traksmaa (27 August 1893 – 16 July 1942) was an Estonian officer and diplomat.

August Traksmaa was born as August Traksmann in the manorial estate in Põlula village, Kreis Wierland (now in Vinni Parish), in the Governorate of Estonia. He Estonianized his name to Traksmaa in 1935. He participated as an officer with the rank of captain in the Estonian War of Independence. From 1926, he was at the Estonian general staff and late became a divisional commander. Between 1936 and 1937 he served as envoy to the Soviet Union. He was promoted to the rank of major-general in 1939 and for a brief period served as deputy minister of war. During the Soviet occupation of Estonia, he was arrested and executed by Soviet forces.
