= Aarla =

Village in Estonia

- Village
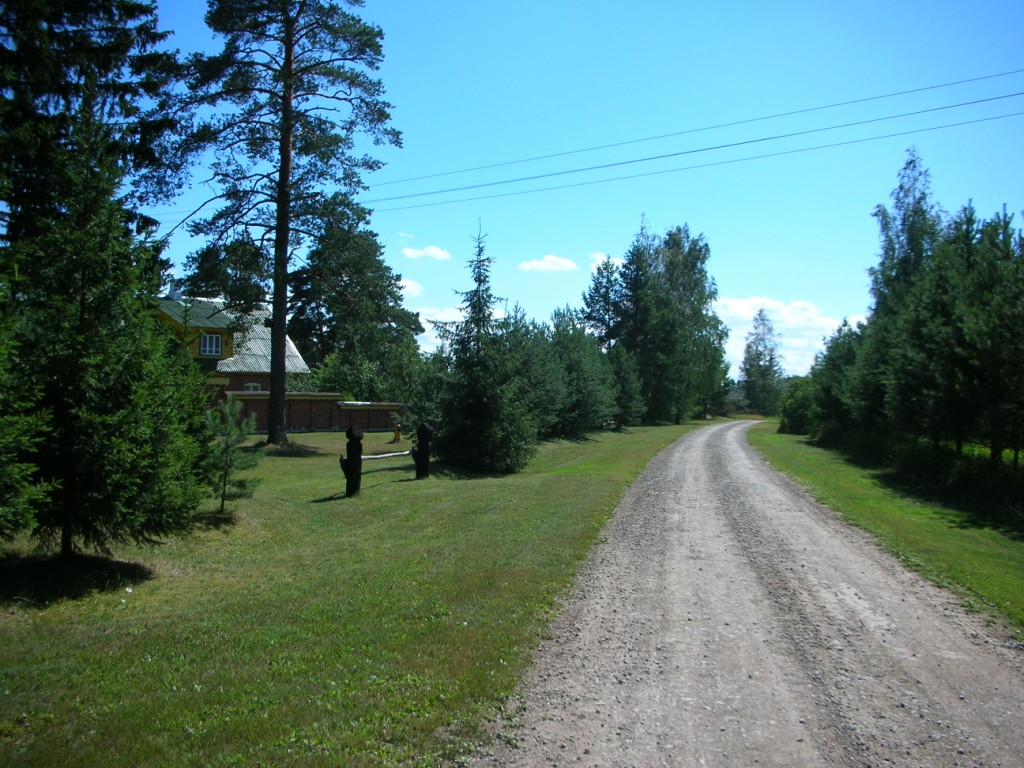

- Location within Estonia
- Coordinates: 59.3621°N 26.6299°E
- Country: Estonia
- County: Lääne-Viru
- Parish: Vinni Parish
- Time zone: UTC+2 (EET)
  - Summer (DST): UTC+3 (EEST)

Aarla is a village in Vinni Parish, Lääne-Viru in Estonia.
