= Voore, Lääne-Viru County =

Village in Estonia

Coordinates: 59°14′06″N 26°30′02″E

Voore
- Village
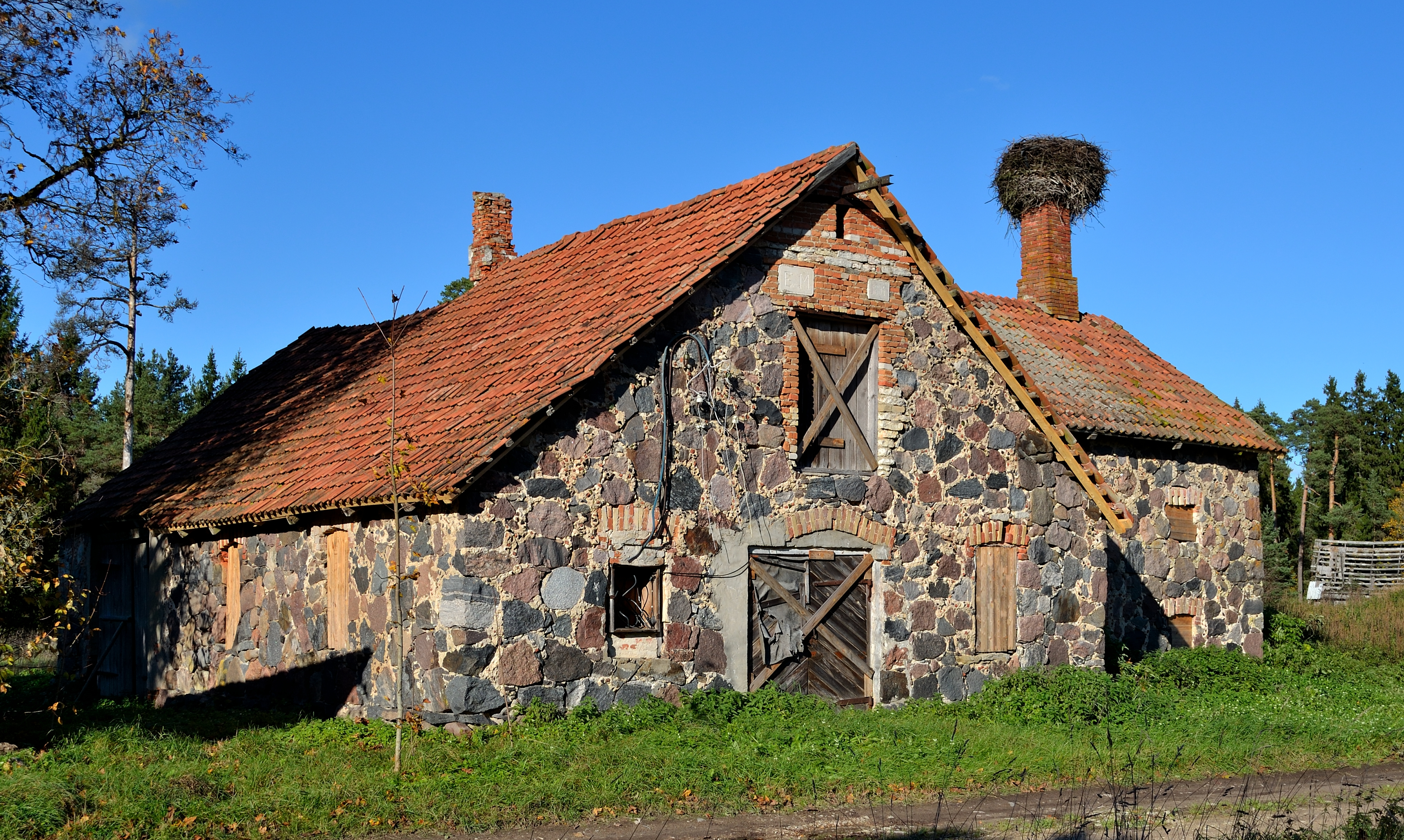
- Interactive map of Voore
- Country: Estonia
- County: Lääne-Viru County
- Parish: Vinni Parish
- Time zone: UTC+2 (EET)
  - Summer (DST): UTC+3 (EEST)

Voore is a village in Vinni Parish, Lääne-Viru County, in northeastern Estonia.
