= Alavere, Lääne-Viru County =

Village in Estonia

Alavere
- Village
- Location within Estonia
- Coordinates: 59°09′44″N 26°39′10″E
- Country: Estonia
- County: Lääne-Viru County
- Parish: Vinni Parish
- Time zone: UTC+2 (EET)
  - Summer (DST): UTC+3 (EEST)

Alavere is a village in Vinni Parish, Lääne-Viru County, in northeastern Estonia.
