= Ivan Kupreyanov =

Russian explorer

Ivan Antonovich Kupreyanov (Russian: Ива́н Анто́нович Купрея́нов or Куприянов; 1794 – 20 April 1857), also spelled in English as Kupreanof or as Kuprianov, served as the head of the Russian-American Company in Russian America from 1835 to 1840. He entered the Sea Cadet Corps at the age of 10, in 1809.

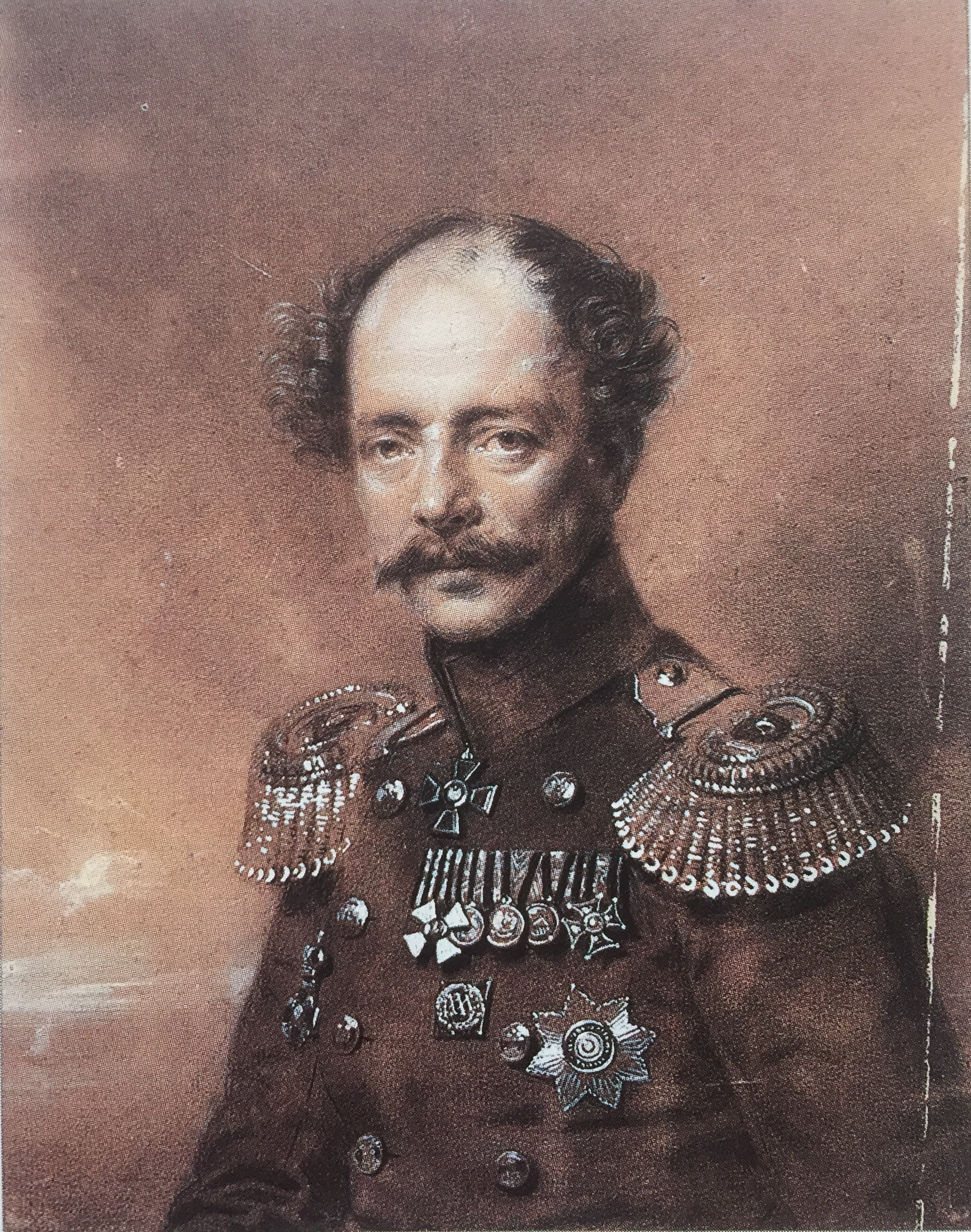
Ivan Antonovich Kupriyanov

Kupreyanov served as a michman on the Mirny under captain Mikhail Lazarev during the First Russian Antarctic Expedition (1819-1821), a circumnavigation of the Southern Ocean led by Fabian Gottlieb von Bellingshausen. The expedition discovered Antarctica and explored a number of island chains in the Pacific and Southern Oceans. He participated in an additional circumnavigation by Lazarev that lasted from 1822 to 1824. Kupreyanov attained the rank of Captain lieutenant with command of a frigate and fought in the Black Sea against the Ottoman Navy during the Russo-Turkish War (1828–29).

Kupreyanov and his wife, Yuliya Ivanovna (nee Gildenbrant), began a school for native girls in Sitka. It closed at the end of his administration but reopened later. He built the famous residence, library and museum in New Archangel called Baranof's Castle by early American settlers, who assumed that it had been built by Alexandr Baranov, Kupreyanov's predecessor by eighteen years. The residence was the site of the ceremony in which control of Russian America passed from the Russian Empire to the United States in 1867. Although the residence fell down in 1897, the hill where it was located is still called Castle Hill. In 1837 Kupreyanov greeted the British captain Edward Belcher, who was commanding a surveying expedition of two ships, HMS Sulphur and HMS Starling. Belcher recorded that "his civilities were overpowering." Departing from New Archangel on 30 September 1840 with his family, Kupreyanov continued his career in the Imperial Russian Navy, and won promotion to the rank of vice admiral in October 1852.

== Legacy ==
Kupreanof Island in the Alexander Archipelago (the Alaska Panhandle) was named after him, and indirectly the city of Kupreanof, Alaska, which is on that island.

Government offices
| Preceded by Ferdinand von Wrangel | Governor of Russian Colonies in America; 1835—1840 | Succeeded by Arvid Adolf Etholén |
