= Rasivere, Lääne-Viru County =

Village in Estonia

Coordinates: 59°09′N 26°40′E

Rasivere
- Village
- Interactive map of Rasivere
- Country: Estonia
- County: Lääne-Viru County
- Parish: Vinni Parish
- Time zone: UTC+2 (EET)
  - Summer (DST): UTC+3 (EEST)

Rasivere is a village in Vinni Parish, Lääne-Viru County, in northeastern Estonia.
