= Vinni Parish =

Municipality of Estonia

Coordinates: 59°17′4″N 26°24′41″E

Vinni Parish Vinni vald
- Municipality of Estonia
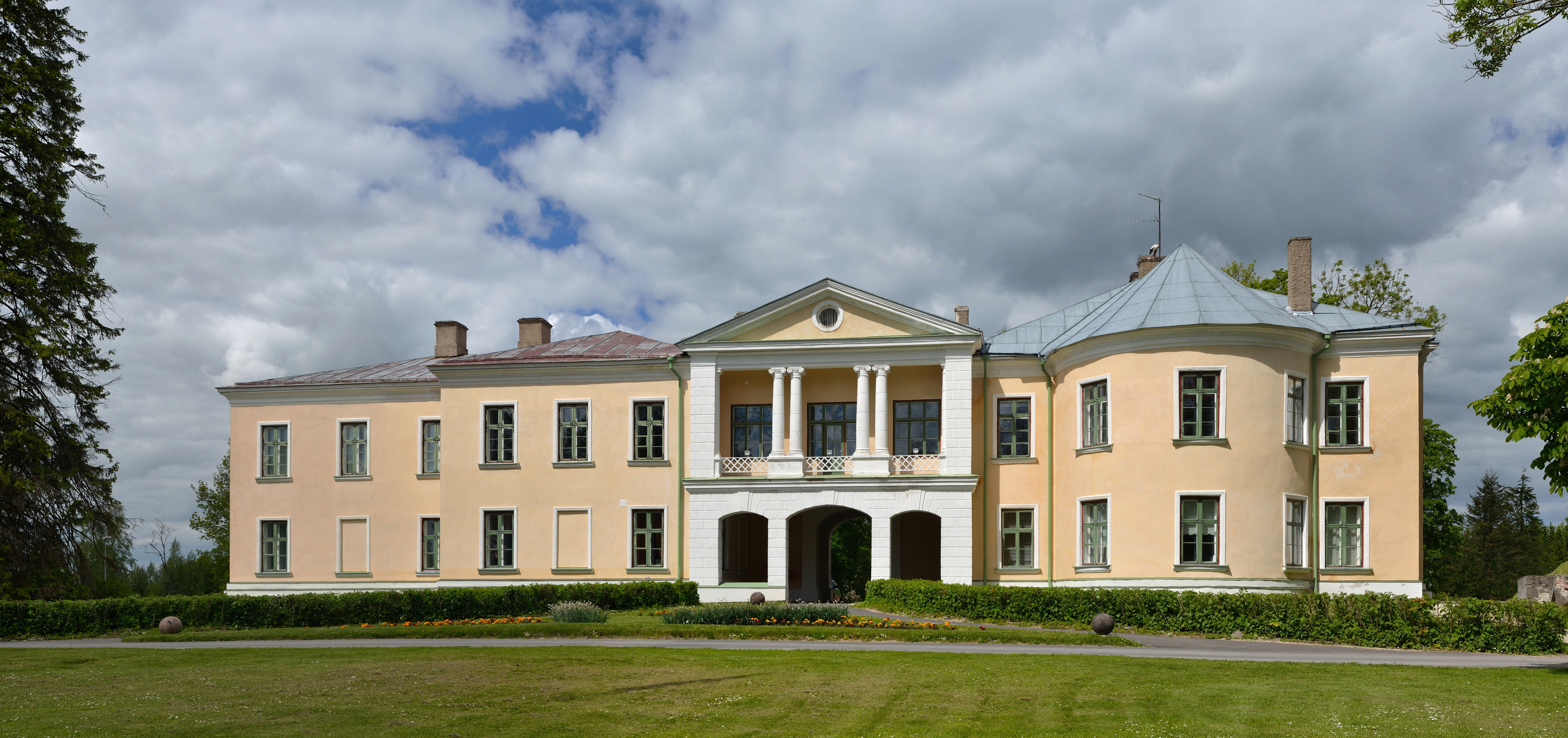
- Mõdriku manor

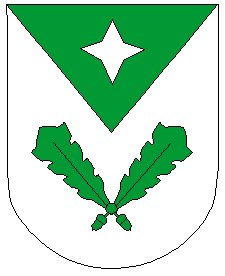
- Flag Coat of arms

- Vinni Parish within Lääne-Viru County
- Country: Estonia
- County: Lääne-Viru County
- Administrative centre: Pajusti

Area
  - Total: 486.65 km^{2} (187.90 sq mi)

Population (01.01.2009)
  - Total: 5,630
  - Density: 11.6/km^{2} (30.0/sq mi)
- ISO 3166 code: EE-901
- Website: www.vinnivald.ee

Vinni Parish (Estonian: Vinni vald) is a rural municipality of Estonia, in Lääne-Viru County. It has a population of 5,630 (as of 1 January 2009) and an area of 486.65 km^{2} (187.90 sq mi).

== Settlements ==
There are 6 small boroughs: Laekvere, Pajusti, Roela, Tudu, Vinni, and Viru-Jaagupi. There are 37 villages: Aarla, Aasuvälja, Alavere, Allika, Anguse, Aravuse, Arukse, Aruküla, Aruvälja, Ilistvere, Inju, Kaasiksaare, Kadila, Kakumäe, Kannastiku, Kantküla, Karkuse, Kaukvere, Kehala, Kellavere, Koeravere, Kõrma, Kulina, Küti, Lähtse, Lavi, Lepiku, Luusika, Mäetaguse, Männikvälja, Miila, Mõdriku, Mõedaka, Moora, Muuga, Nõmmise, Nurkse, Nurmetu, Obja, Paasvere, Padu, Palasi, Piira, Põlula, Puka, Rahkla, Rajaküla, Rasivere, Ristiküla, Rohu, Rünga, Saara, Sae, Salutaguse, Sirevere, Soonuka, Sootaguse, Suigu, Tammiku, Uljaste, Ulvi, Vana-Vinni, Vassivere, Veadla, Venevere, Vetiku, Viru-Kabala, Võhu, and Voore.

== Religion ==
Among the residents of Vinni Parish, 8.6% declared themselves to be Lutheran, 3.2% as Orthodox while other Christian denominations make up 1.8% of the population. The majority of residents of the parish, 85.0% are religiously unaffiliated. 1.4 % of the population follows other religions or did not specify their religious affiliation.

== Notable people ==
- Nikolai Anderson (1845–1905), a Baltic German philologist from Kulina
- twins, Kristjan Raud (1865–1943) & Paul Raud (1865–1930), painters from Kirikuküla
- August Traksmaa (1893–1942), military officer and diplomat from Põlula
- Mihkel Jürna (1899–1972), writer and translator, from Soonuka
- Heino Sepp (1936–2008), rally driver, from Põlula
