= Põlula =

Village in Estonia

Coordinates: 59°19′N 26°37′E

- Village
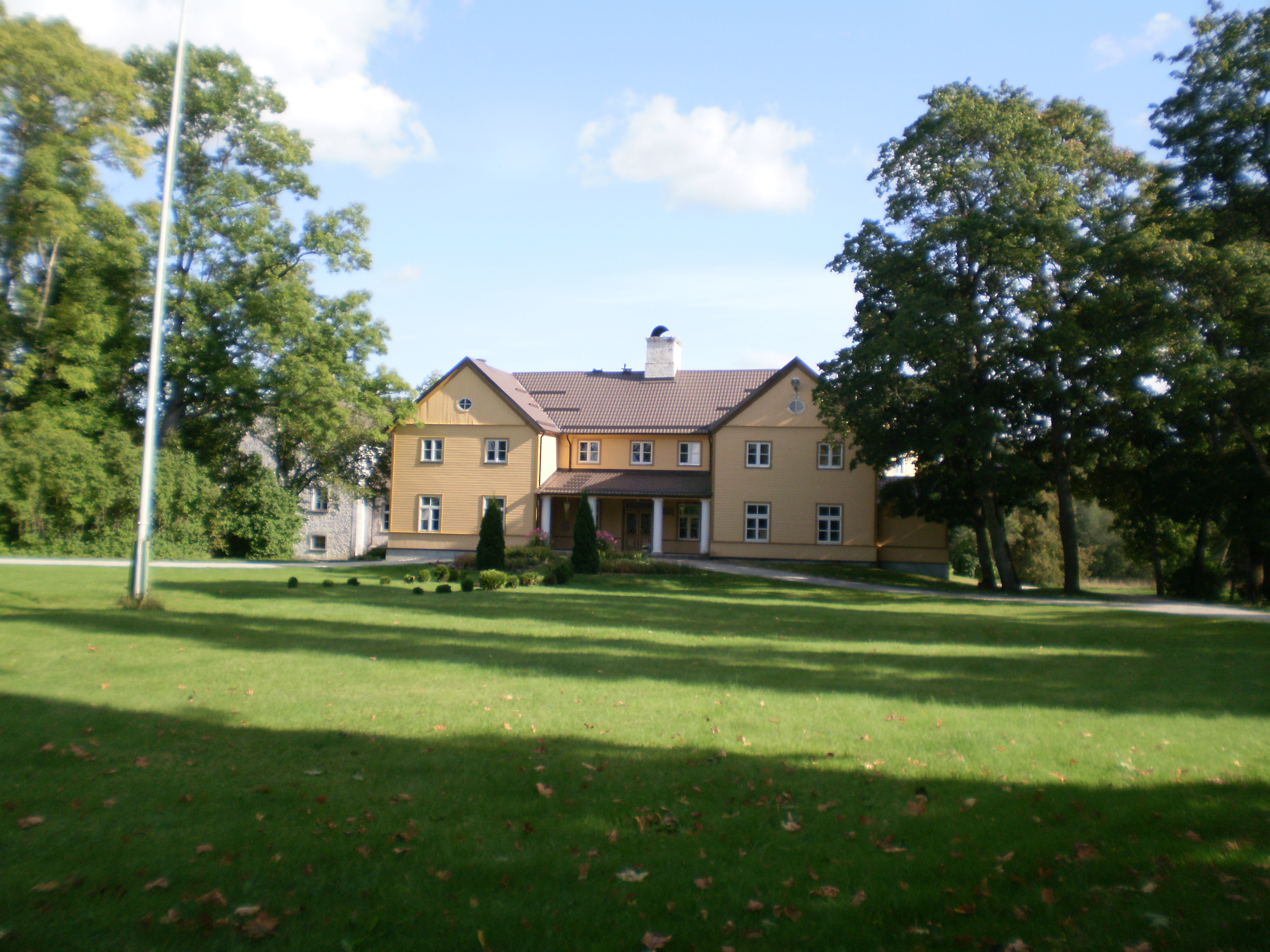
- Põlula manor estate (now, Põlula School)
- Interactive map of Põlula
- Country: Estonia
- County: Lääne-Viru County
- Parish: Vinni Parish
- Time zone: UTC+2 (EET)
  - Summer (DST): UTC+3 (EEST)

Põlula (German: Poll) is a village in Vinni Parish, Lääne-Viru County, in northeastern Estonia.

From 1992 to 2017 (until the Estonian local government administrative reform), the village was located in Rägavere rural municipality .

There is a manor in Põlua, which operates as a school.

According to 18th-century maps, there was a small lake near the village of Põlula (see Põlula Fish Farming Centre) and two watermills.

Estonian general August Traksmaa was born in Põlula.
