= Alavere, Jõgeva County =

Village in Estonia

Alavere
- Village
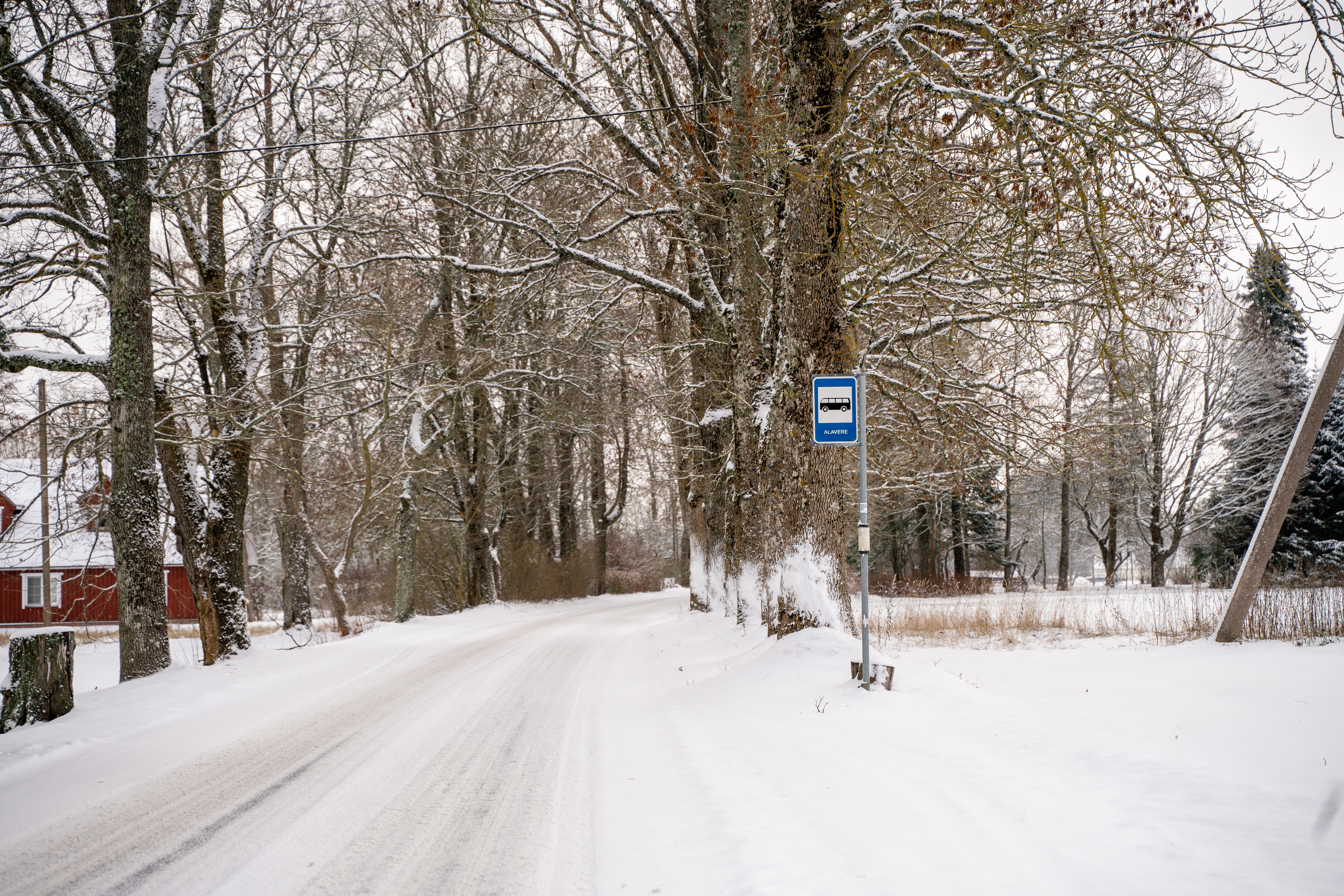

- Location within Estonia
- Coordinates: 58°46′18″N 26°30′36″E
- Country: Estonia
- County: Jõgeva County
- Parish: Jõgeva Parish
- Time zone: UTC+2 (EET)
  - Summer (DST): UTC+3 (EEST)

Alavere is a village in Jõgeva Parish, Jõgeva County in eastern Estonia.
