= Viru-Kabala =

Village in Estonia

- Village
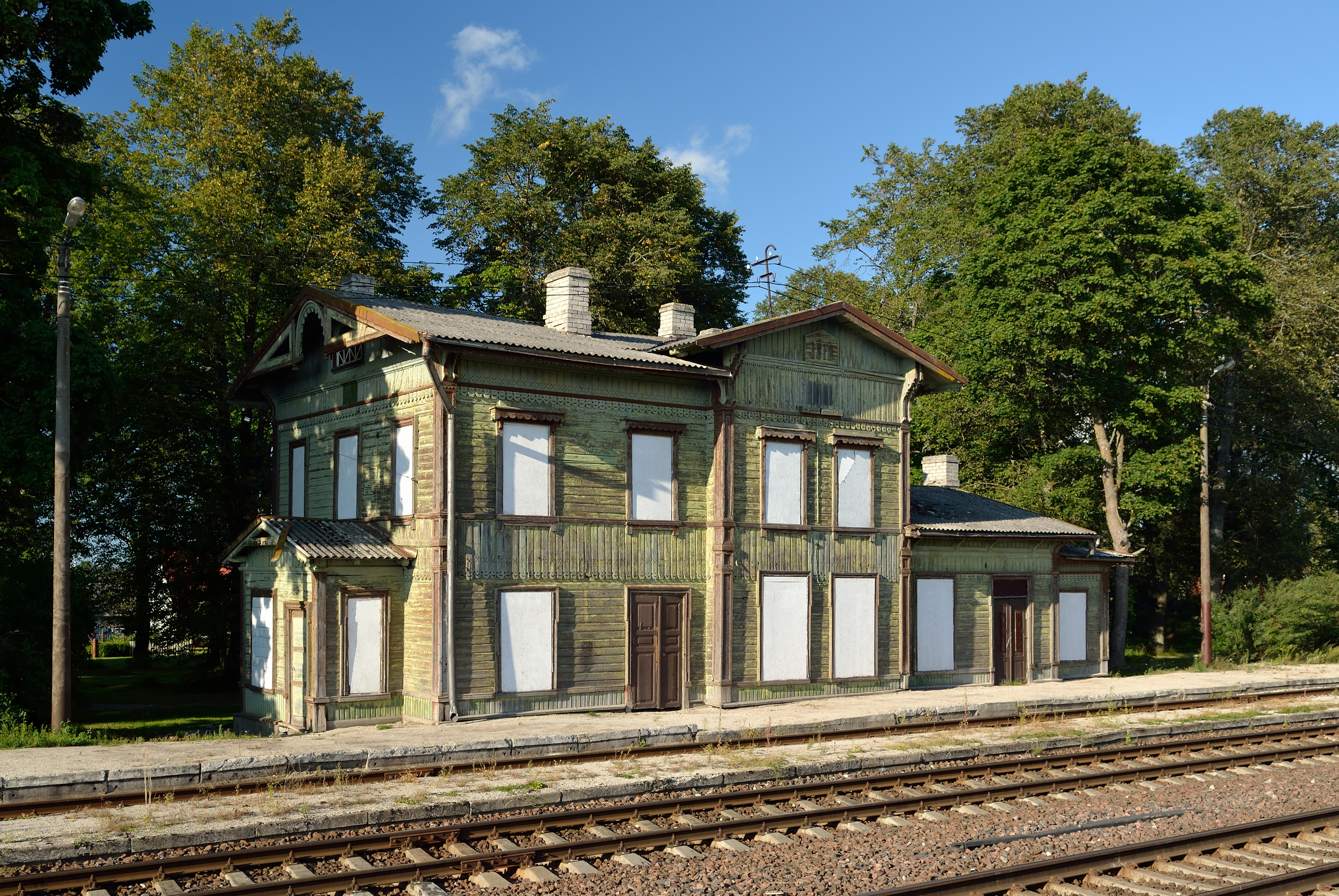
- Kabala railway station

- Location in Estonia
- Coordinates: 59°20′51″N 26°40′34″E
- Country: Estonia
- County: Lääne-Viru County
- Municipality: Vinni Parish

Population (01.01.2019)
  - Total: 113

Viru-Kabala is a village in Vinni Parish, Lääne-Viru County, in northeastern Estonia. It is located by the Tallinn–Narva (Tallinn–Saint Petersburg) railway, 18 km east of Rakvere and 9 km west of Sonda. The village has a population of 113 (as of 1 January 2019). Prior to the 2017 administrative reform of Estonian local governments, the village was located in Rägavere Parish.

Preceding station	Elron	Following station
Rakvere towards Tallinn	Tallinn–Narva	Sonda towards Narva
