= Ulvi, Lääne-Viru County =

Village in Estonia

Ulvi
- Village
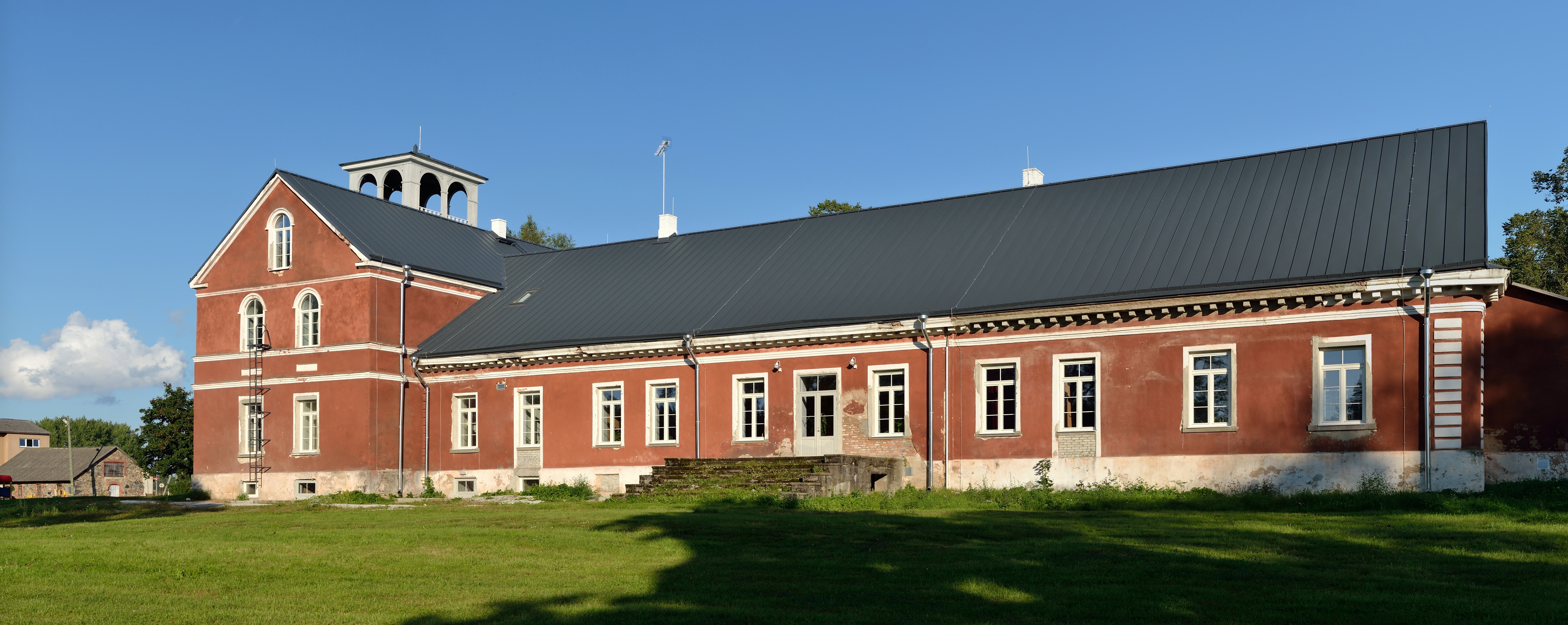

- Location in Estonia
- Coordinates: 59°19′31″N 26°37′53″E
- Country: Estonia
- County: Lääne-Viru County
- Municipality: Vinni Parish
- First mentioned: 1489

Population (01.01.2010)
  - Total: 341

Ulvi is a village in Lääne-Viru County, in northeastern Estonia. It's located about 16 km east of the town of Rakvere and about 18 km (11 mi) west of Kiviõli, in Vinni Parish. Prior to the 2017 administrative reform of Estonian municipalities, Ulvi was the administrative centre of Rägavere Parish. The village has a population of 341 (as of 1 January 2010).

Ulvi Manor (Oehrten) was first mentioned in 1489. In the 18th century it belonged to the Clapier de Colongue family and from 1803 to von Winkler. The last owner was Alexander von Winkler who owned the manor until 1939. The main building is constructed in two stages. In the 1880s, a two-storey historicist extension with a tower was added to the simple single-storey main building. Nowadays the building is used as the local government of Rägavere Parish.

Ulvi is bordered by the Kunda River on its western side.

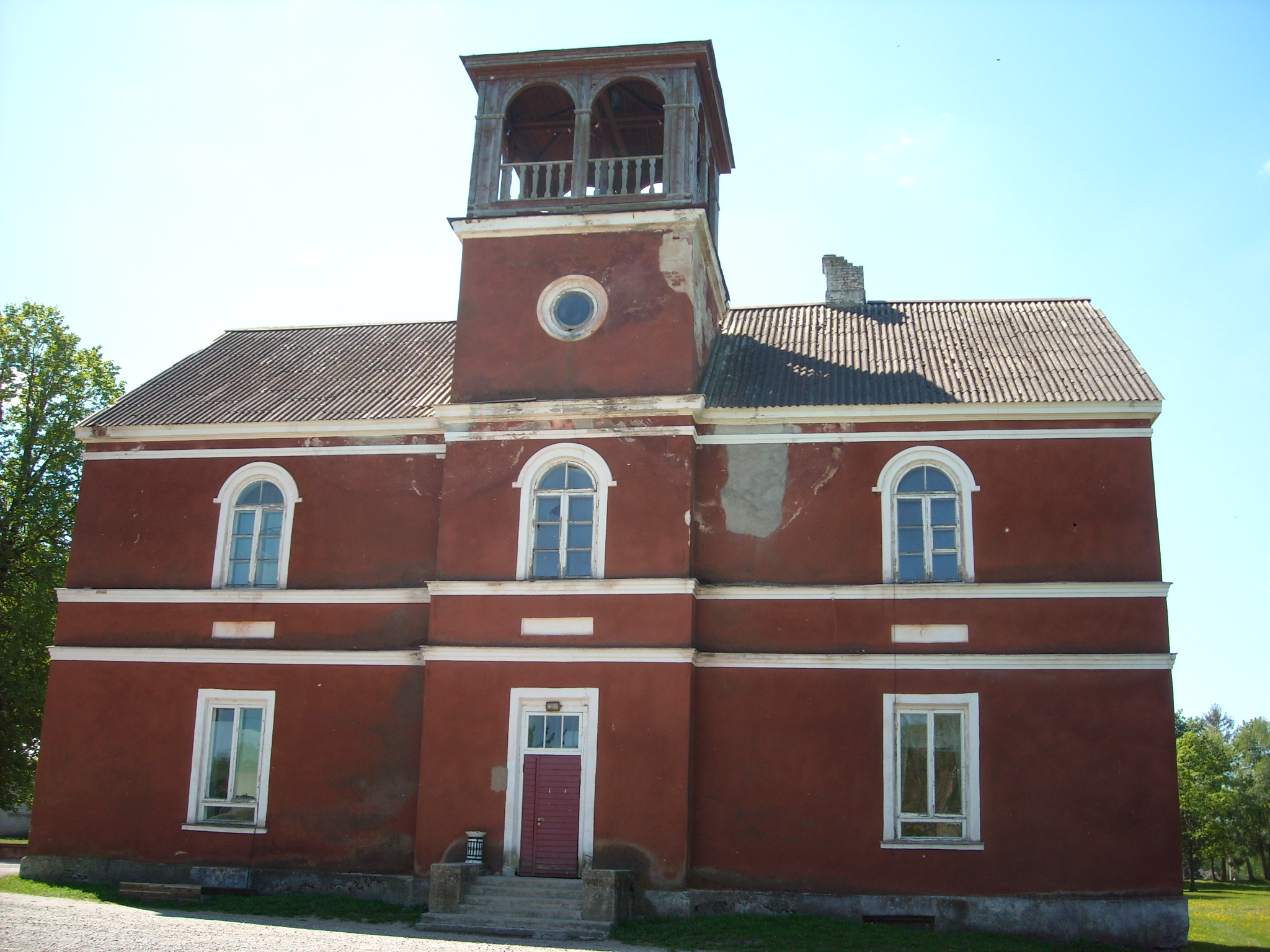
Ulvi Manor

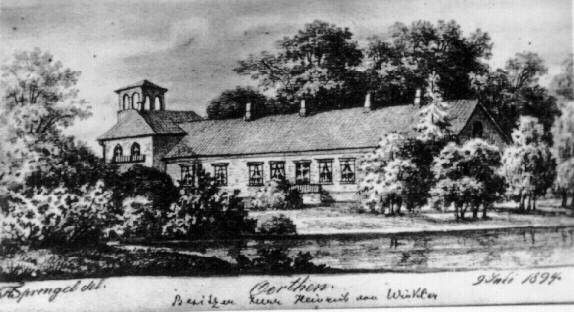
Ulvi Manor in 1894.
