= Rannapungerja (river) =

River in Estonia

Rannapungerja River
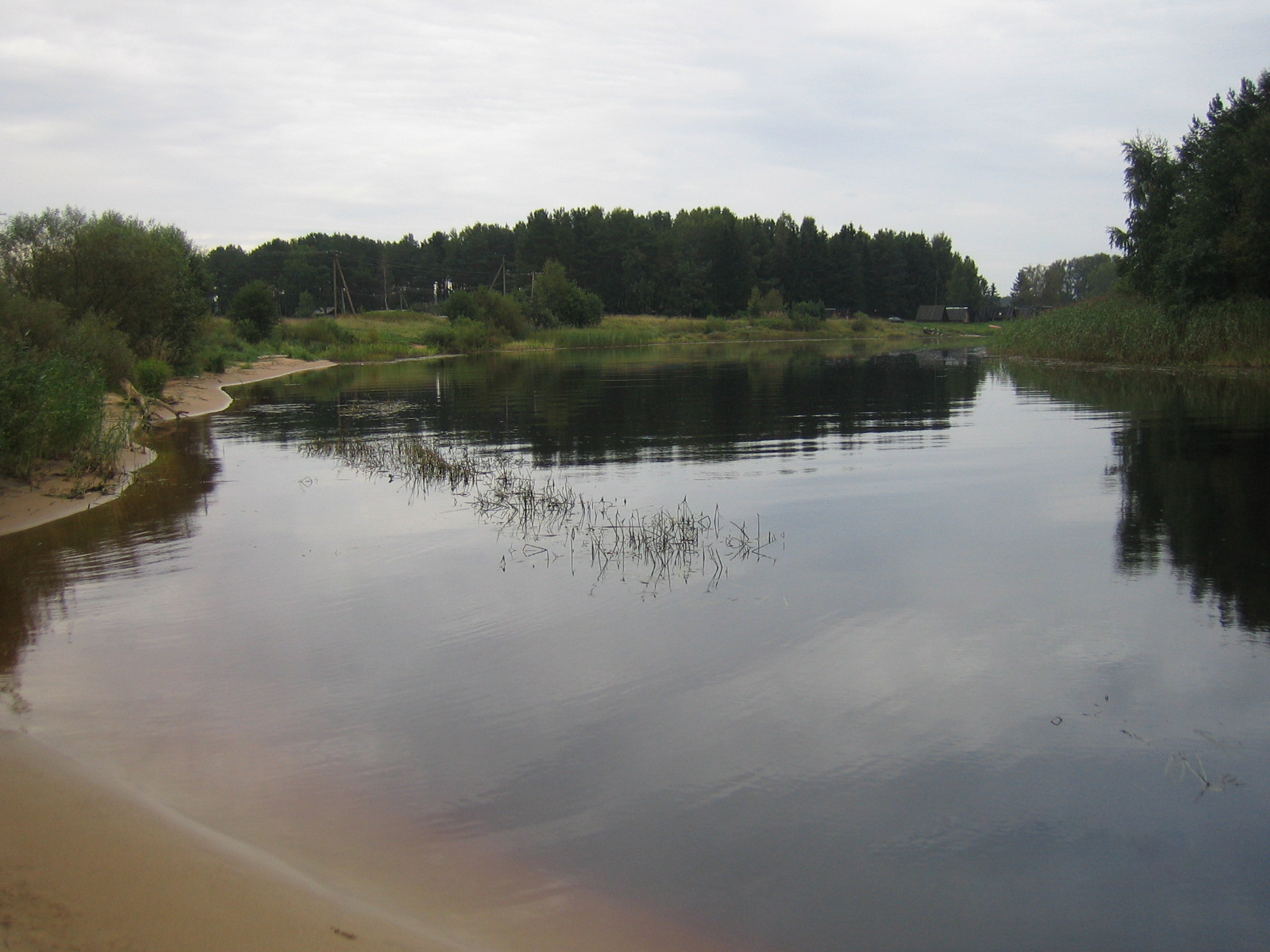

Location
- Country: Estonia

Physical characteristics
- Mouth: Lake Peipus
  - coordinates: 58°58′45″N 27°10′39″E
- Length: 63 km (39 mi)
- Basin size: 594.6 km^{2} (229.6 sq mi)

Drone video of the Rannapungerja River and the Järuska Bridge

The Rannapungerja River is a river in Ida-Viru County, Estonia. The river is 63 km long, and its basin size is 594.6 km^{2}. It empties into Lake Peipus.

Trout and grayling live in the river.
