= Viru-Jaagupi =

Borough in Estonia

- Small borough
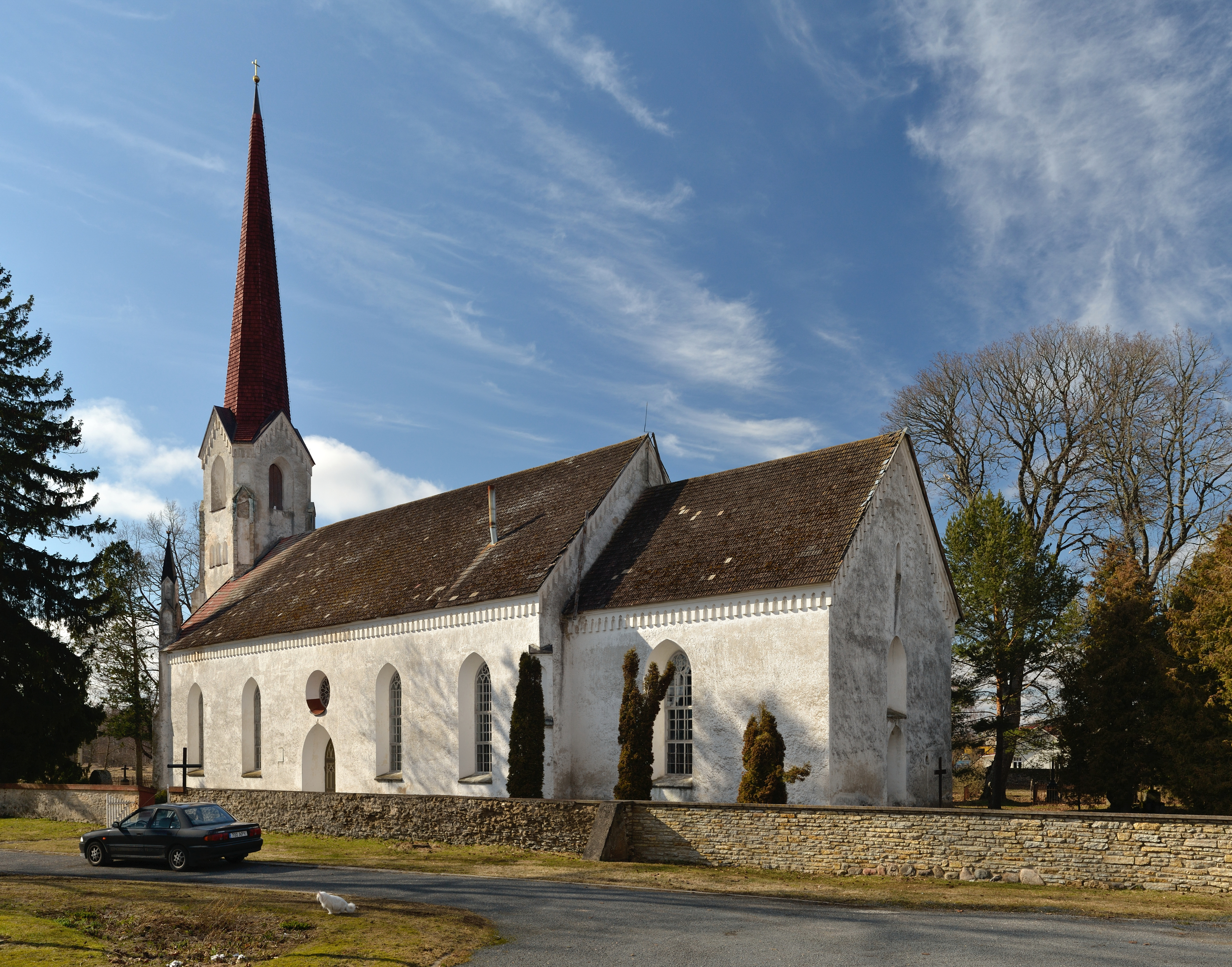

- Location in Estonia
- Coordinates: 59°19′14″N 26°28′20″E
- Country: Estonia
- County: Lääne-Viru County
- Municipality: Vinni Parish

Population (2011 Census)
  - Total: 404

Viru-Jaagupi (German: Sankt Jakobi) is a small borough (Estonian: alevik) in Vinni Parish, Lääne-Viru County, Estonia. As of the 2011 Census, the settlement's population was 404.
