= Pajusti =

Borough in Estonia

- Location within Estonia
- Coordinates: 59°16′28″N 26°25′24″E
- Country: Estonia
- County: Lääne-Viru County
- Parish: Vinni Parish

Population (2019)
  - Total: 645
- Time zone: UTC+2 (EET)

Pajusti is a small borough (alevik) in Lääne-Viru County in northern Estonia. It is the administrative centre of Vinni Parish. Pajusti is primarily an agricultural town in the northern sections of Estonia. it served as an important supply depot during World War 2 and the Cold War.
