= Tio Tepandi =

Estonian artist

Tio Tepandi (real name Tiiu Tepandi; born 24 November 1947) is an Estonian artist. Her grandfather was a gardener of the local estate. The memories of her birthplace, its beauty and harmony have always accompanied and influenced the artist.

== Early life and education ==
Tio Tepandi was born in Lüganuse, Ida-Viru County and studied in the Institute of Arts in the Chair of Architecture Design from 1966 to 1971.

== Career ==
Tepandi has worked in various Estonian theaters as for over 17 years. During the years from 1972 to 1985, she worked together with several well-known cultural figures and producers, including Epp Kaidu, Kaarin Raid, Kaarel Ird, Ülo Vilimaa, Evald Hermaküla, Jaan Tooming, Raivo Adlas and others as an artist-producer in the Tartu theater Vanemuine.

Until 2000 she worked as the Director of Interior Design and Arts in the Estonian National Library (ENL). During her 6 years in ENL, she designed and planned a multitude of international and national events and art galleries. She also actively planned and designed and/or redesigned the ENL’s interior visual informational system, banquet halls, furniture and landscaping.

== Works ==
She has designed and produced two books/albums of two important cultural figures.

=== Books ===
- Marie Under – a very important and well-known poet from Estonia. The book includes many previously unpublished photos and other content. The book illustrates the poet's life, her liturgy and time in its majesty and the tragedy of losing her homeland during the Socialists invasion.

Title: Marie Under Publisher: Estonian Literary Museum and Publishing House "Ilmamaa" 2003

- Evald Hermaküla – Also a very well known and important political and cultural figure in Estonia. The book contains a unique selection of never before published letters to his wife and children. The book also contains a number of never before seen pictures from private collections.

Title: Evaldi Armastus. Kirjad ("The Love of Evald. Letters") Publisher: Publishing House "Tänapäev" 2005

=== Exhibitions ===
- 1979 Personal exhibition, Artists House, Tartu, Estonia
- 1980 Triennial of Theater Art, Tallinn (Estonia, Latvia, Lithuania)
- 1980 Exhibition of Theater Designers, Moscow, USSR
- 1981 Group Exhibition, Head Office of UNICEF, Paris, France
- 1983 Group Exhibition of Estonian Theater Designers, Estonian Theater Association, Tashkent, USSR
- 1998 Personal Exhibition, National Library Hall, Tallinn, Estonia
- 2000 Personal exhibition, National Library, Tallinn, Estonia
- 2000 Exhibition of Estonian Theater Designers, Rotermann`s Salt Storage, Art Center, Tallinn, Estonia
- 2018 Exhibition Voldemar Haas 120
- 2018 Exhibition Marie Under 135

== Personal life ==
From 1969, Tiiu Tepandi was married to actor, singer and theatre pedagogue Tõnu Tepandi.
