= Kumu (museum) =

Art museum in Tallinn, Estonia

Kumu Art Museum
- Kumu kunstimuuseum

- Entrance to the Kumu Art Museum
- Established: 17 February 2006
- Location: Weizenbergi 34 / Valge 1, Tallinn, Estonia
- Coordinates: 59°26′11″N 24°47′47″E
- Type: Art museum
- Visitors: 128,712 (2013)
- Director: Kadi Polli
- Public transit access: "Kumu", TLT 31, 67, 68; 39
- Website: https://kumu.ekm.ee/en/

The Kumu Art Museum (Estonian: Kumu kunstimuuseum) is an art museum in Tallinn, Estonia. It is one of the largest museums in Estonia and one of the largest art museums in Northern Europe. It is one of the five branches of the Art Museum of Estonia, housing its main offices.

"Kumu" is a stylised portmanteau abbreviation of the Estonian words kunsti muuseum ("museum of art").

Kumu presents both permanent collections and temporary exhibitions. The main collection covers Estonian art from the 18th century onwards, including works from the occupations' period (1940–1991) and showing both Socialist realism and what was then Nonconformist art. Temporary exhibitions include both foreign and Estonian modern and contemporary art.

Kumu received the prestigious European Museum of the Year Award of 2008 from the European Museum Forum.

== The building ==
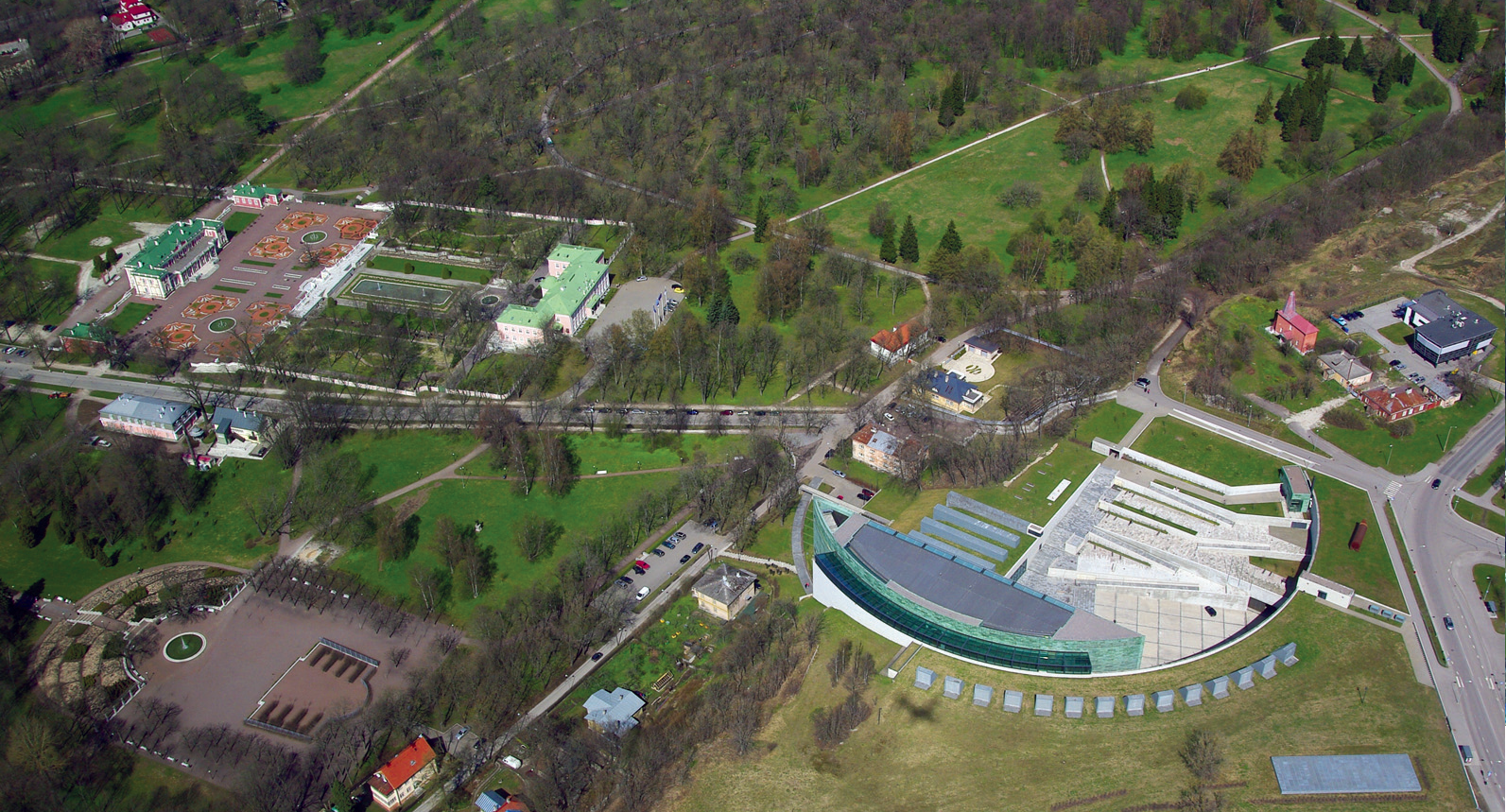
Overhead view of museum

The designer of the building is Pekka Vapaavuori, a Finnish architect who won the competition in 1994. Construction took place between 2003–2006. The museum is set into the limestone slope of Lasnamäe hill to harmonise, despite its size, with centuries-old Kadriorg Park.

=== Layout ===
- Ground floor: Entrance from the Kadriorg Park side, auditorium and cafe.
- 1st floor: Entrance from the Lasnamägi car park side, terrace, information, cloakroom, toilets, large auditorium, library, bookstore and restaurant. Temporary exhibitions wing.
- 2nd floor: Classics of Estonian art from the 18th century until the end of the Second World War.
- 3rd floor: Estonian art from 1945 to 1991.
- 4th floor: Temporary contemporary art exhibitions, art after 1991.

== History of the museum ==
The Art Museum of Estonia was founded on 17 November 1919. It was not until 1921 that it got its first permanent building — the 18th-century Kadriorg Palace. In 1929, the palace was expropriated from the Art Museum in order to rebuild it as the residence of the head of state of Estonia.

The Art Museum of Estonia was housed in several different temporary spaces until it moved back to the palace in 1946. When Estonia regained independence in 1991, Kadriorg Palace was closed for renovation, since it had fallen into almost complete disrepair during the Soviet occupation of Estonia (1944–1991). At the end of 1991, the Estonian parliament decided to secure the construction of a new building for the Art Museum of Estonia in Kadriorg Park. Until the new building was finished, the Estonian Knighthood House at Toompea hill in the Tallinn Old Town served as the temporary main building of the Art Museum of Estonia. The exhibition there was opened on 1 April 1993. The Art Museum of Estonia permanently closed down the exhibitions in that building in October 2005. In the summer of 2000 the restored Kadriorg Palace was opened, but not as the main building of the Art Museum of Estonia, but as a branch. The Kadriorg Art Museum now exhibits the foreign art collection of the Art Museum of Estonia.

Kumu includes exhibition halls, an auditorium that offers diverse possibilities, and an education centre for children and art lovers (see above). Kumu has a thorough collection of Estonian art, including paintings by Carl Timoleon von Neff, Oscar Hoffmann, Ants Laikmaa, Julia Hagen-Schwarz, Oskar Kallis, Konrad Mägi, Jaan Koort, Henn Roode, and Johannes Greenberg.

The museum served as one of several locations for the fictional Oslo Freeport for the 2020 movie Tenet.

== From the collections ==
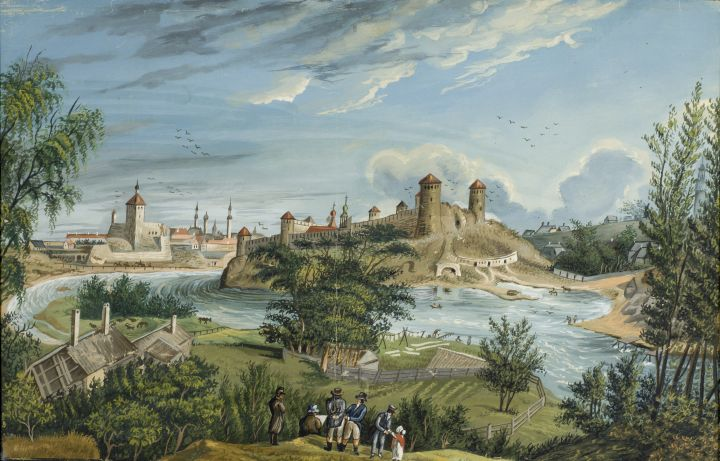
View of Narva (1812), by Karl August Senff (1770–1838)

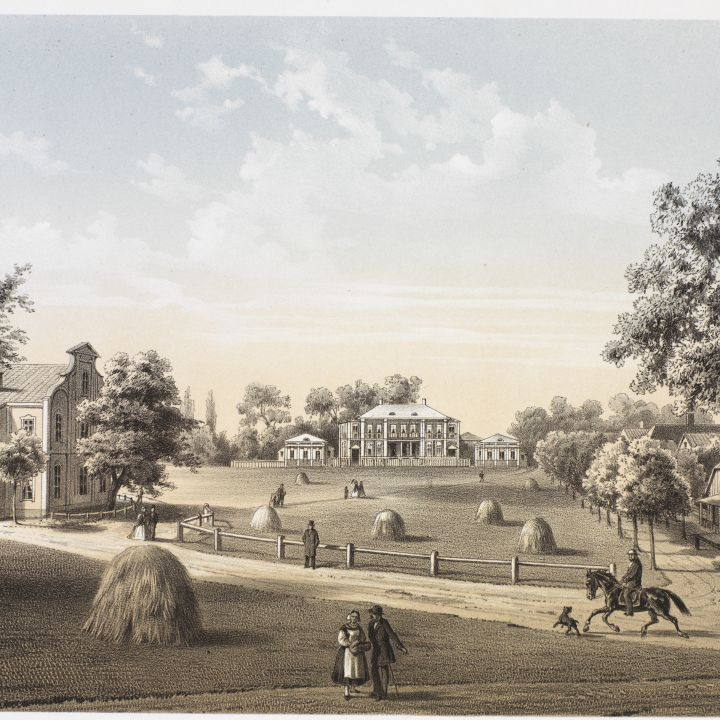
Green Meadow in Kadriorg (ca. 1865), by Lorenz-Heinrich Petersen (1805–1895)

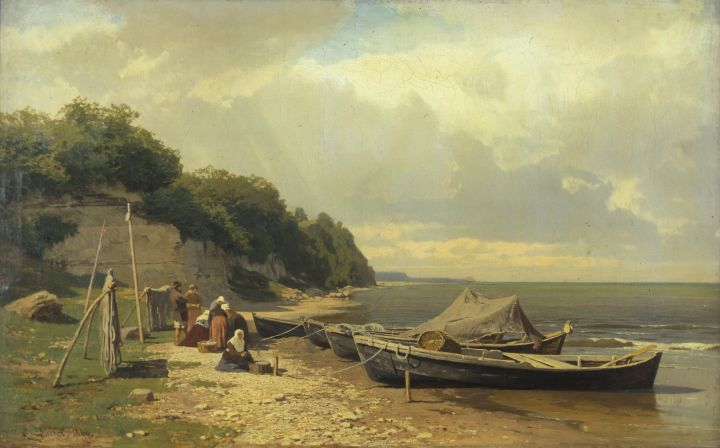
Seashore at Tiskre (1866), by Eugen Dücker (1841–1916)

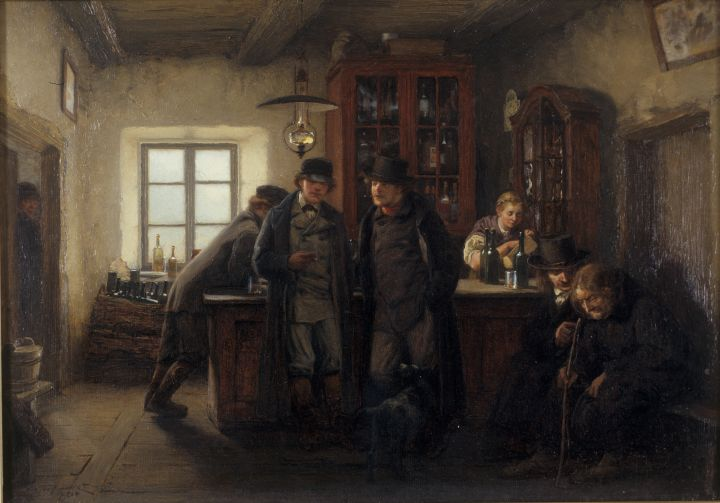
Farmers in an Inn, by Oskar Hoffmann (1851–1912)

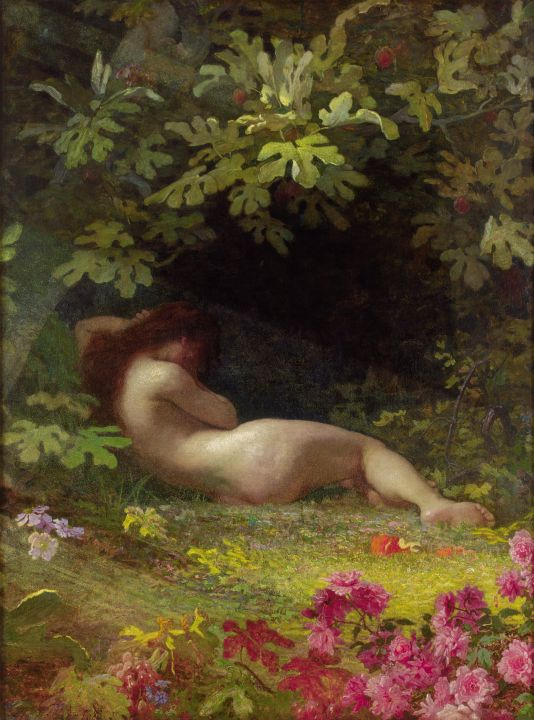
Eve after Falling Into Sin (1883), by Johann Köler (1826–1899)

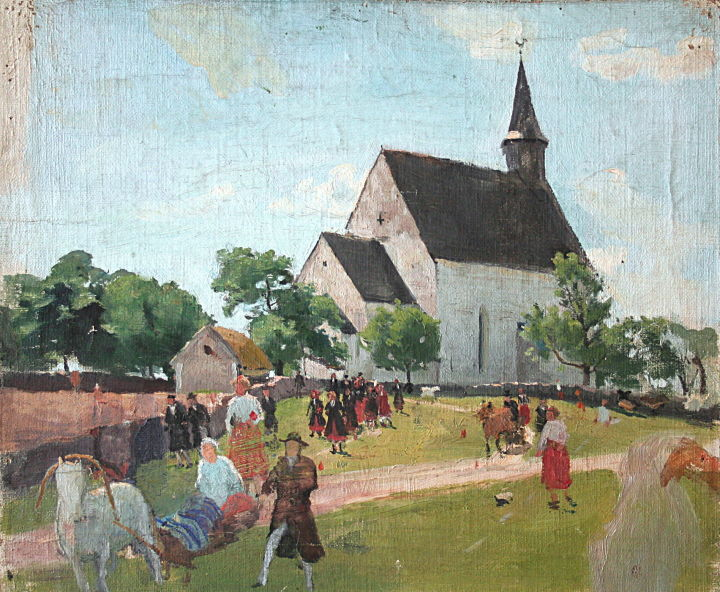
Muhu Church (1893), by Paul Raud (1865–1930)

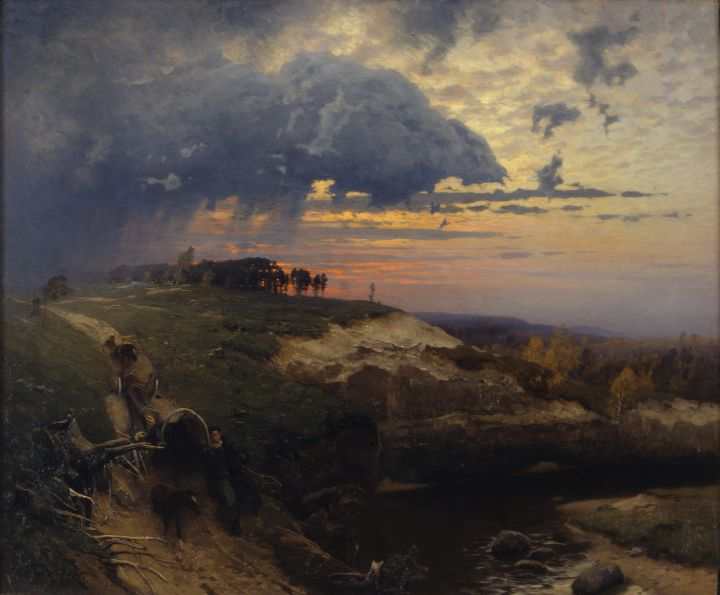
Freight of Timber. Landscape with Lightning (ca. 1894), by Oskar Hoffmann (1851–1912)

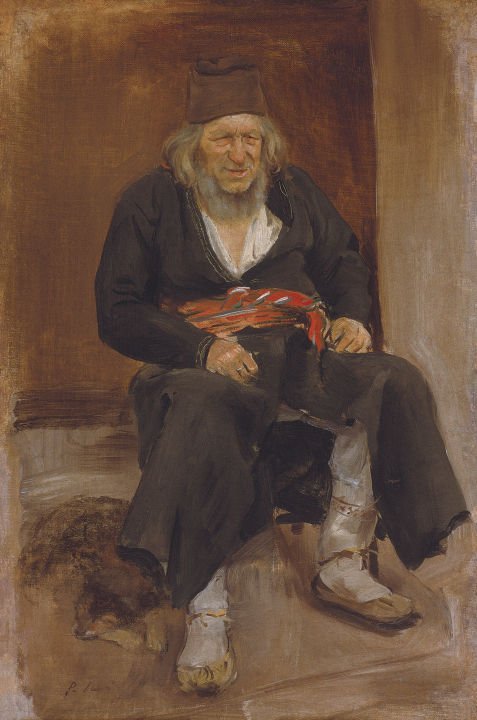
Old Man from Muhu (1898), by Paul Raud (1865–1930)

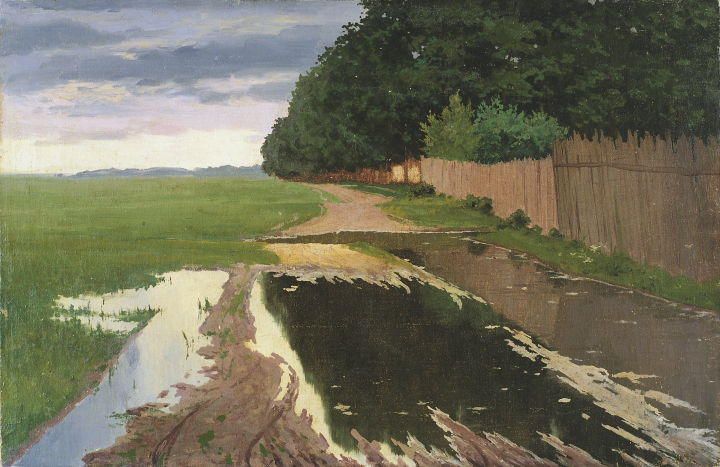
A Landscape with a Fence (1906–1911),
by Paul Raud (1865–1930)

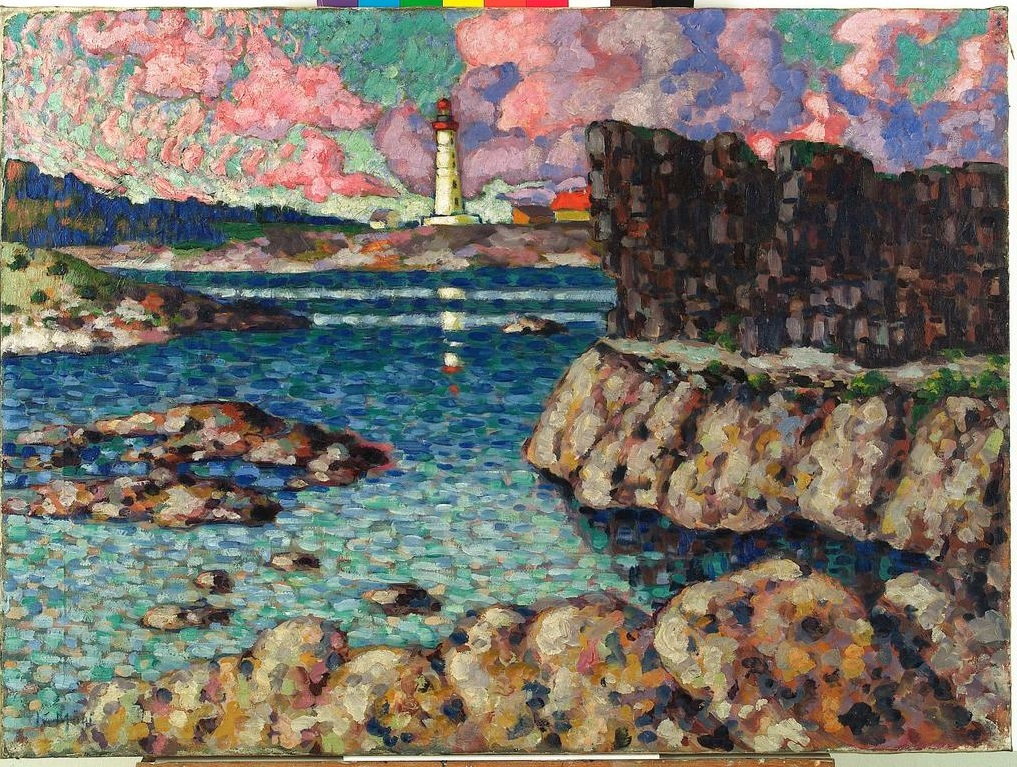
Landscape of Vilsandi (1913–1914),
by Konrad Mägi (1878–1925)

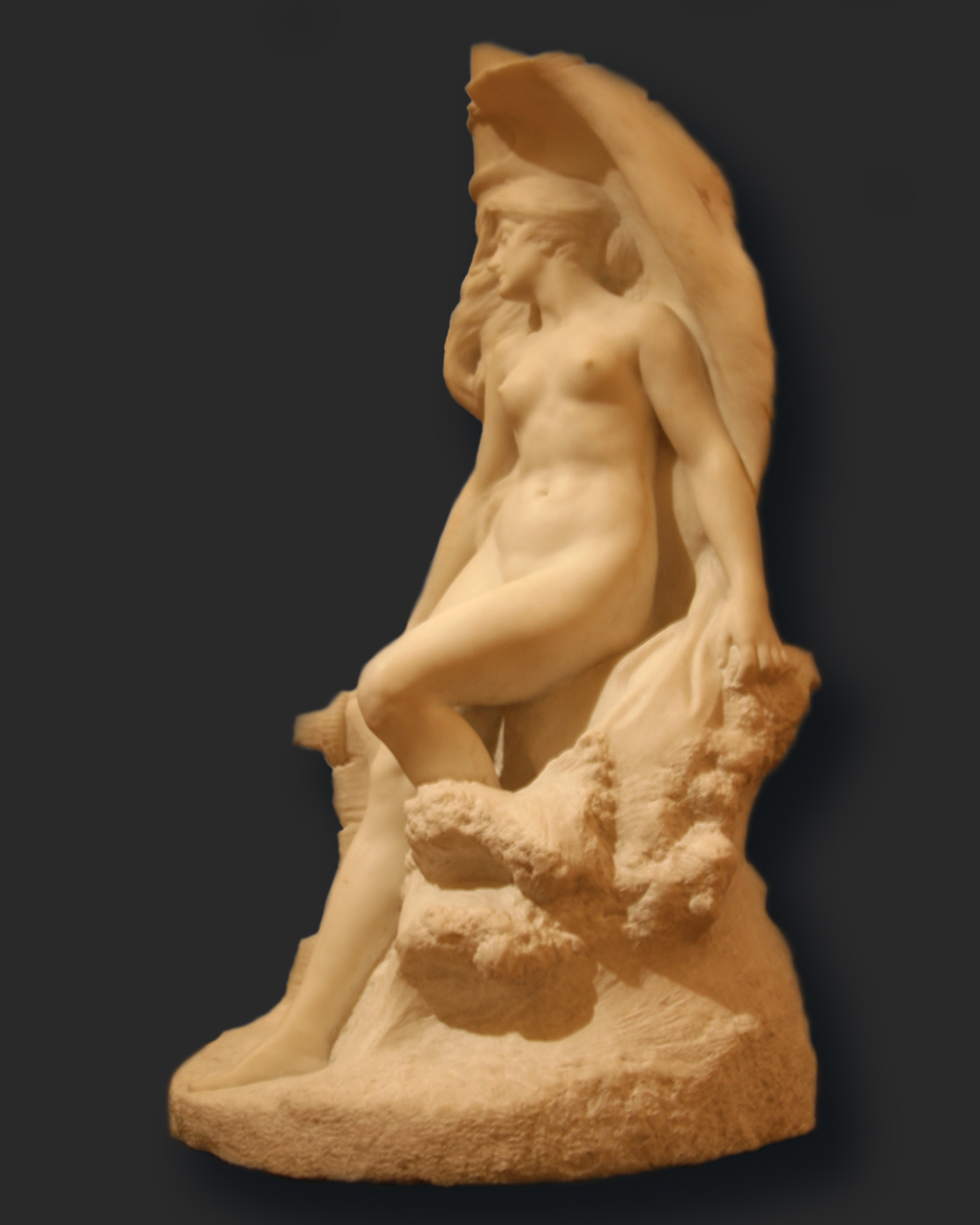
The Ship's Last Sigh (1899), by Amandus Adamson (1855–1929)

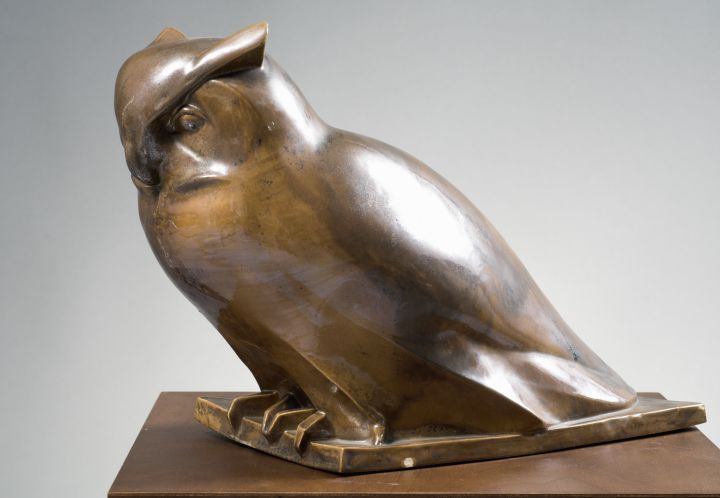
Owl (1933), by Jaan Koort (1883–1935)

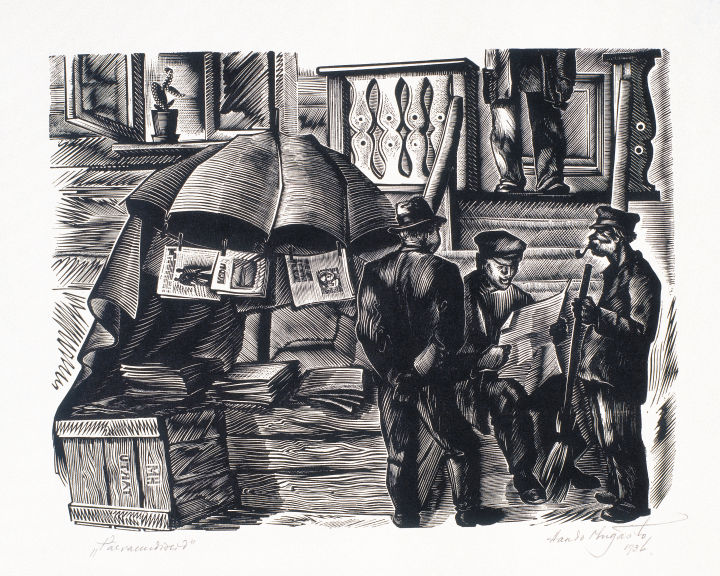
Daily News (1936), by Hando Mugasto (1907–1937)

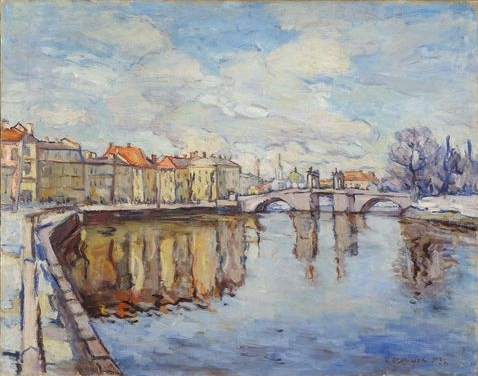
Motif of Tartu (1937), by Villem Ormisson (1892–1941)

== See also ==
- Art Museum of Estonia (other branches of the museum)
