= Wiera (disambiguation) =

Wiera is a river in Germany.

- Upper course of Wehra
- August Wiera, Estonian theatre and music person
- Wiera, Polish-language given name variant of Vera:
  - Wiera Jelinek (born 1960), Polish Reformed priest, the first woman in the history of the Evangelical Reformed Church in the Republic of Poland to be ordained a pastor
  - Wiera Gran, Polish singer and actress
  - Wiera Richter (fl. 1923), Polish tennis player
  - Wiera Zasulicz, Russian revolutionary
