= Tõnu Tepandi =

Estonian politician (b. 1948)

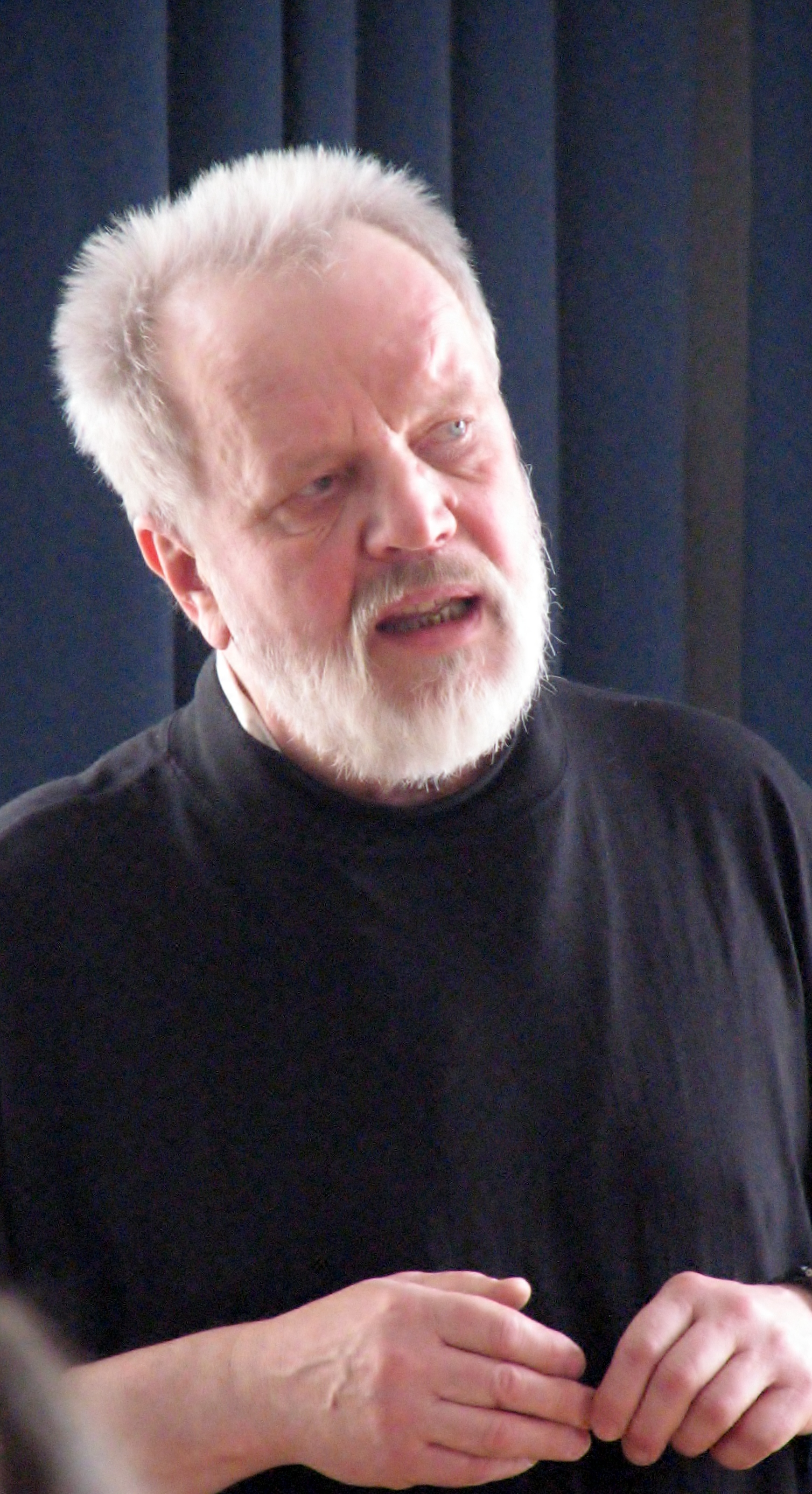
- Tepandi at the presentation of book There is a Voice at First
- Born: 4 June 1948 (age 77); Tallinn, then part of Estonian SSR, Soviet Union
- Occupations: actor, singer, teacher, theatre pedagogue, author, politician
- Years active: 1966–present
- Spouse: Tiiu Tepandi
- Awards: Order of the White Star, V Class

Tõnu Tepandi (born 4 July 1948 in Tallinn) is an Estonian actor, singer, teacher, theatre pedagogue, politician, and an Estonian social figure.

== Education and work ==
From 1955 to 1966, Tõnu attended Tallinn 2. Secondary School (Estonian: Tallinna 2. Keskkool). Afterward, he pursued his studies at Tallinn Conservatory from 1966 to 1970, specializing in acting at the Performing Arts Department.

Following his education, he became an actor at Vanemuine Theater from 1970 to 1983. He then moved to Estonian National Youth Theater, where he worked as an actor from 1983 to 1987.

Since 1985, he has also been involved in teaching voice engineering at the Estonian Academy of Music and Theatre, specifically at the School of Performing Arts. He became a professor in 2006.

In addition to his teaching career, Tõnu started working as a freelance actor in 1987. He also engaged with a humor organization called Aara (:et) from 1987 to 1992.

From 1994 to 1997, Tõnu served as the Deputy Chairman of the Cultural Endowment of Estonia and the Chairman of the Endowment of Applied Arts. He was also the Chairman of the Estonian Theater Association from 1994 to 2000.

Tõnu's academic involvement extended to the Viljandi Culture Academy, the Estonian Institute of Humanities, and the Estonian Academy of Arts, where he lectured from 1997 to 2008.

Tõnu chaired the jury for the Estonian Drama Festival from 1996 to 1998. Additionally, from 1992 to 1999, he served as a member of the Riigikogu, the Estonian Parliament.

== Books ==
Alguses on hääl ("There is a Voice at First")

== Music ==
Concerts:

- "Mu kodu on punaste pihlade all" ("My home is under red stalks") Vanemuine, 1977
- "Süda on mul vaevas" ("My heart is troubled") Vanemuine, 1980
- "Tepandi ja Vanapagana lood" ("Tepandi, the Devil and their stories") Youth Theater, 1985

Film Music:

- "Lõppematu päev" ("An Endless Day") 1971, by Virve Aruoja and Jaan Tooming, music by Tõnu Tepandi and Olav Ehala

== Albums ==
- LP "Tõnu Tepandi laulud" ("Songs of Tõnu Tepandi"), 1982
- CD "Kõlakoda" ("The Chalet"), 2003

== Important roles ==
- Romulus – Friedrich Dürrenmatt "Romulus Suur" ("Romulus the Great"), TRK Stage Artist, 1970
- Ullike – Evald Hermaküla "Üks ullike läks rändama" ("One ullike went on a journey"), Vanemuine 1973
- Andrei Buslai – Aleksey Dudarev "Üle läve" ("Over the threshold"), Ugala theatre, 1984
- George – John Steinbeck "Hiirtest ja inimestest" ("Mice and People"), Ugala theatre, 1993
- Horace Vandergelder – "Hallo, Dolly!" By Jerry Herman, Estonian National Opera, 1996
- Henry Higgins – George Bernard Shaw "Pygmalion", Ugala theatre, 2000
- Domenico Soriano – Eduardo De Filippo "Abielu Itaalia moodi" ("Italian Wedding"), Ugala theatre, 2001
- Fellbom – Max Lundgren "Unistus Mallorcast" ("Dream of Majorca"), Ugala theatre, 2001
- Father and father-in-law – Vaino Vahing "Suvekool" ("Summer School"), Rakvere Theatre, 2003
- Juhan Luiga – Katri Aaslav-Tepandi and Vaino Vahing "Teatriromanss" ("Theater Romance") National Opera of Estonia, 2004
- Olovernes – A. H. Tammsaare "Juudit" ("Jew"), Estonian National Opera, 2006
- President Konstantin Päts – "President 1939" by Katri Aaslav-Tepandi and Tõnu Tepandi, Estonian National Opera, 2008

== Acknowledgements ==
- Order of the White Star, V Class 2002

== Personal life ==
From 1969, Tõnu Tepandi was married to artist Tiiu Tepandi.
