= Theatre of Estonia =

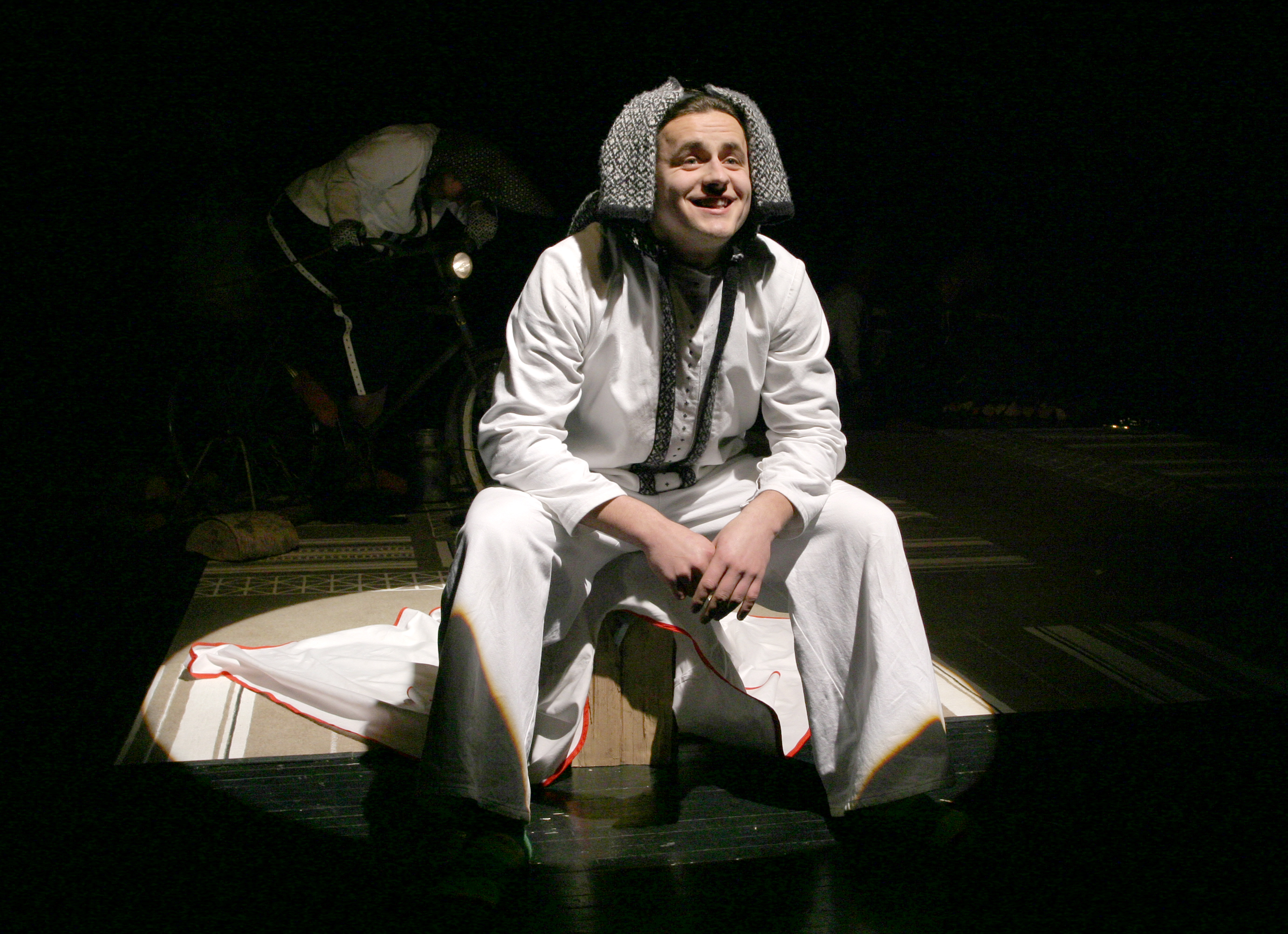
Tarmo Tagamets "Võrumaa rituaalid" (2007)

The theatre of Estonia dates back to 1784, when August von Kotzebue founded an amateur theatre company in Tallinn. Most of the plays at the time were comedies for the amusement for local Baltic German nobility. In 1809 a professional theatre company was established, with its own building in Tallinn, the Tallinna saksa teater. The repertoire was mostly in German but plays in Estonian and Russian were also performed.

After serfdom was abolished in Estonia in 1816, the first native Estonian musical society, Vanemuine, was established in 1865. The Vanemuine society's staging of Lydia Koidula's The Cousin from Saaremaa in 1870 marks the beginning of theatrical drama in the Estonian language.

The Vanemuine Music and Theatre Society was led by August Wiera from 1878 to 1903. In 1906 a new building was erected for the society and the theatre company turned professional under the directorship of Karl Menning. Plays by Western writers such as Henrik Ibsen, Gerhart Hauptmann, Russian Maksim Gorky and Estonian August Kitzberg, Oskar Luts and Eduard Vilde were staged.

Also in 1906 the Estonia Music and Theatre Society in Tallinn turned professional under the leadership of Theodor Altermann and Paul Pinna. This company later became the Estonian National Opera.
