= Jaan Koort =

Estonian sculptor

Jaan Koort (6 November 1883, Sootaga Parish (Äksi), Tartu – 14 October 1935 in Moscow) was an Estonian sculptor, painter and ceramicist.

Statue of Koort in Kadriorg Park, Tallinn by Edgar Viies and Andres Mänd.

Born on 6 November in Tartu, he was the thirteenth child of village farmers Susanna-Marie and Jaan Koort. He studied at Orge village school. During the period from 1896 to 1900 he studied at the Tartu city school. In 1901, he participated in the German Craftsmen Society's drawing courses. His studies continued at the Saint Petersburg Stieglitz State Academy of Art and Design (1902–1905), where he studied painting and sculpture. During the Revolution of 1905 he left St. Petersburg, and later moved back to Estonia, then later to Finland, and from there to Paris.
