= Vapaavuori =

Vapaavuori is a Finnish surname. Notable people with the surname include:

- Jan Vapaavuori (born 1965), Finnish politician
- Pekka Vapaavuori (born 1962), Finnish architect
- Pekka Vapaavuori (pianist) (born 1945), Finnish pianist
