= Hardwasser =

River in Germany

Location
- Country: Germany
- States: Hesse

Physical characteristics
- Mouth
  - location: Wiera
  - coordinates: 50°52′45″N 9°07′55″E

Basin features
- Progression: Wiera→ Schwalm→ Eder→ Fulda→ Weser→ North Sea

Hardwasser is a small river of Hesse, Germany. It flows into the Wiera in the village Wiera.

== See also ==
- List of rivers of Hesse
