= Liina Orlova =

Estonian actress

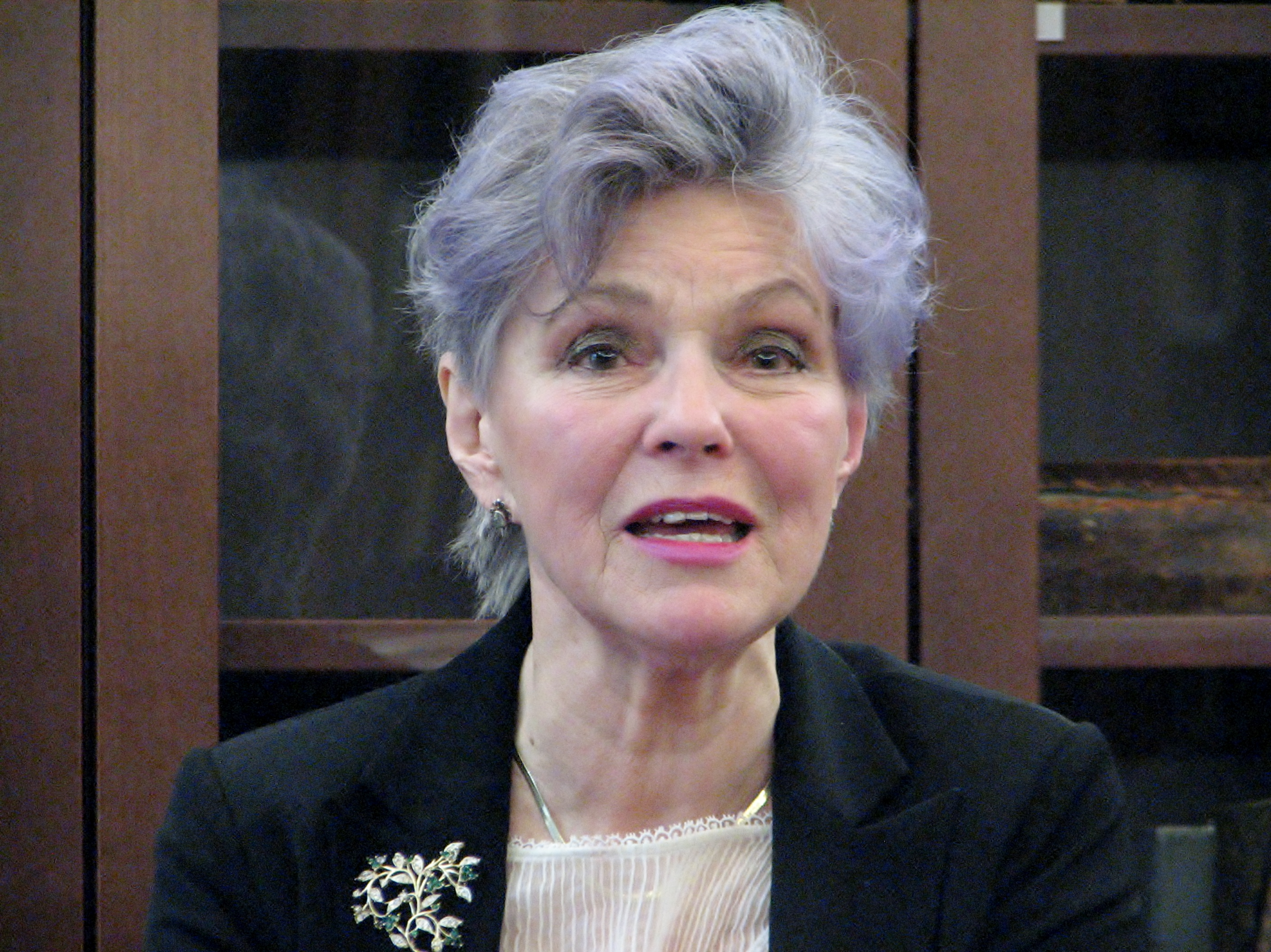
- Liina at the Tallinn Central Library, 2014
- Born: Liina Hermaküla; September 13, 1941 (age 84); Chelyabinsk Oblast, Soviet Union
- Education: Estonian Academy of Music and Theatre
- Occupation: Actress
- Spouse(s): Viktor Avdyushko (m. 1968; died 1977) Evald Hermaküla (m. 1978; div. 1988)
- Children: Maria Avdjuško

Liina Hermaküla (born on 13 September 1941 in Chelyabinsk Oblast), more commonly known by her stage name as Liina Orlova, is an Estonian actress. Prior to her acting, she was a student at the Estonian Academy of Music and Theatre between 1961 and 1965.

== Filmography ==
- 1965: "Supernoova"
- 1986: "Õnnelind flamingo"
- 1987: "Metsluiged"
- 1990: "Ainus pühapäev"
- 2010: "Punane elavhõbe"
- 2011: "Vereringe"
