= The Maiden of the Grave =

1919 painting by Kristjan Raud

Coordinates: 59.4365°N 24.7970°E

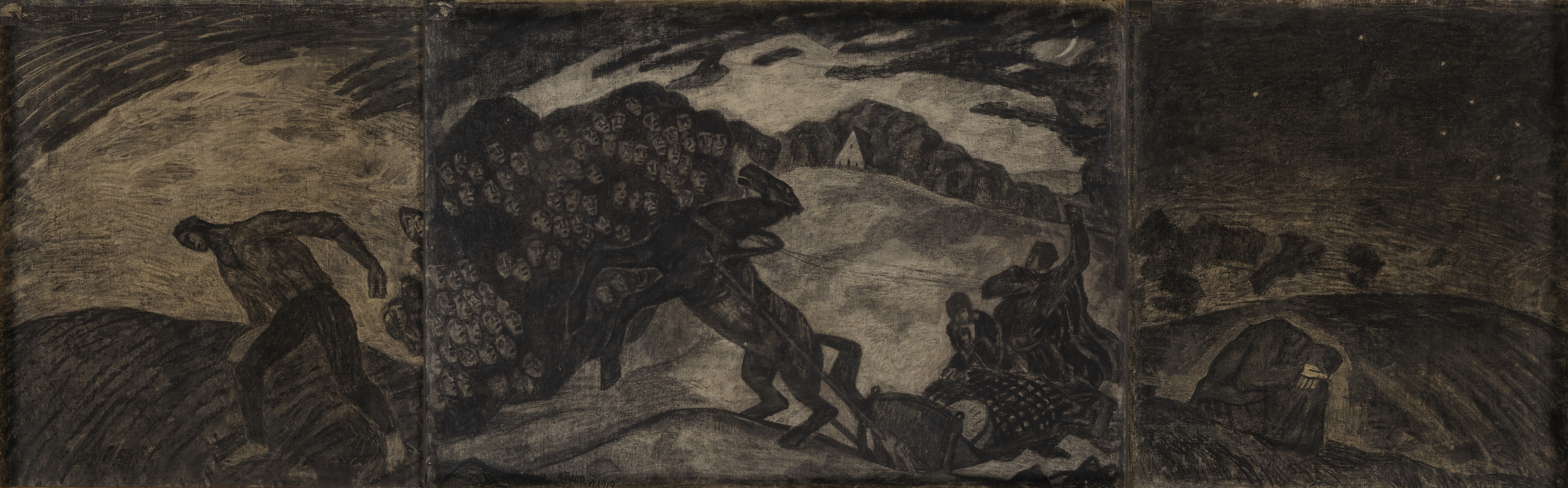
- Artist: Kristjan Raud
- Year: 1919
- Medium: charcoal drawing on paper
- Dimensions: 77.8 cm × 248.3 cm (30.6 in × 97.8 in)
- Location: Art Museum of Estonia; Tallinn

The Maiden of the Grave is a charcoal drawing triptych by Kristjan Raud, from 1919.

== Description ==
The painting is a charcoal on paper with overall dimensions of 77.8 x 248.3 centimeters. It is in the collection of the Art Museum of Estonia, in Tallinn.

== Analysis ==
The scene shows an elemental struggle for survival during a time of war.
