= Kadi Polli =

Estonian art historian and curator

Kadi Polli (born 16 September 1973 in Tallinn) is an Estonian art historian, curator and teacher.

2000-2013 she was the head of Kadriorg Art Museum. Since 2016 she is the head of Kumu Museum.

In 2008 she was awarded with the Order of Orange-Nassau (Holland).

Doctoral thesis 2019 Enlightenment Art. Baltic Dilettanti and Drawing Practices at the Turn of the Nineteenth Century”.
