= Epp Kaidu =

Estonian theatre director and actress

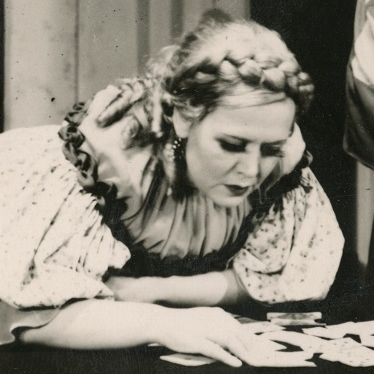
- Epp Kaidu in 1947
- Born: Leida Rosenblatt; 15 April 1915; Jäärja vald, Governorate of Livonia
- Died: 23 June 1976 (aged 61); Tallinn, then part of Estonian SSR, Soviet Union
- Other name: Leida Ird
- Education: Tartu Performing Arts Studio
- Spouse: Kaarel Ird (m. 1936)
- Children: 2
- Relatives: Raivo Adlas (son-in-law)

Leida Ird (née Rosenblatt; 1915–1976), known professionally as Epp Kaidu, was an Estonian theatre director and actress.

== Career ==
In 1936, Kaidu graduated from Tartu Performing Arts Studio. From 1937 until 1939, she worked at Tartu Töölisteater. From 1940 until 1941, she worked at the Vanemuine Theatre in Tartu. From 1942 to 1944, she was a member of the Estonian SSR State Artistic Ensembles. From 1944 to 1976, she worked as a theatre director at Vanemuine Theatre. In 1952, she graduated from higher courses of direction (Estonian: kõrgemad režiikursused) in Moscow.

== Personal life ==
In 1936, Kaidu married the theatre director and actor Kaarel Ird. Together, they had two children: the actresses Kais Adlas and Mari Palm. Kaidu was the mother-in-law of Raivo Adlas, an actor and director.

== Awards ==
	Year(s) Received	Ref.
Estonian SSR State Prize	1947, 1948, 1972	
Order of the Red Banner of Labour	1956	
People's Artist of the Estonian SSR	1957	
Order of the Presidium of the Supreme Soviet of the Estonian SSR	1965	
Order of Friendship of Peoples (1975)	1975	

== Productions of plays ==
- Jakobson's Võitlus rindejooneta (1947)
- Dunajevski's Vaba tuul (1948)
- Miljutin's Rahutu õnn (1949)
