= Edgar Viies =

Estonian sculptor

Viies' sculpture, "Merineid", produced in 1980; it was dedicated to the Tallinn Sailing Regatta of the 22nd Olympiad. Located in Tammsaare Park, Tallinn.

Edgar Viies (12 January 1931, Simititsa, Leningrad Oblast – 20 September 2006) was an Estonian sculptor.

Edgar was born in Leningrad Oblast Volosovo to a farming family. From 1951-52 he studied at the Estonian State Art Institute and then of Leningrad Academy of Arts, graduating in 1958. He acted as a freelance artist throughout his life.

In 1974 he was awarded the Kristjan Raud Art Award. In 2002 he was given the Estonian Cultural Endowment annual award.
