= Pekka Vapaavuori =

Finnish architect (born 1962)

Pekka Juhani Vapaavuori (born 6 August 1962, in Turku) is a Finnish architect. He graduated from the Tampere University of Technology in 1993 and started his own architect office in Turku in 1994. Among his realizations is the Kumu Art Museum, in Tallinn, Estonia.
