= Paul Raud =

Estonian painter

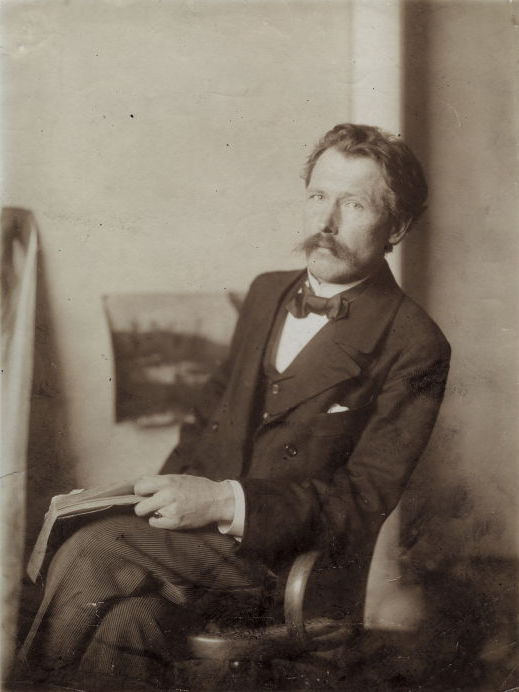
- Paul Raud, c. 1910
- Born: October 22, 1865; Kirikuküla, present-day Estonia
- Died: November 22, 1930 (aged 65); Tallinn, Estonia
- Education: Kunstakademie Düsseldorf
- Movement: Realism, Impressionism
- Relatives: Kristjan Raud (twin brother)

Paul Raud (22 October [O.S. 10 October] 1865 in Kirikuküla, Viru-Jaagupi Parish – 22 November 1930 in Tallinn) was an Estonian painter.

== Life and works ==
He studied at the Kunstakademie Düsseldorf from 1888 to 1896. He became influenced by the work of Eduard von Gebhardt. He is associated with the Düsseldorf school of painting.

After his return to Estonia, he painted mainly portrait commissions for some time, before traveling with his brother and Amandus Adamson to the islands of Muhu and Pakri in 1896. His works of this period are reminiscent of those of Max Liebermann.

In 1899 he returned to work in Germany, taking on some of the stylistic trappings of Impressionism; this, coupled with time spent working with Ilya Repin, influenced his later style. Later in his career, most especially during and after World War I, he began to teach, from 1915 working as a drawing instructor at the Tallinn Institute of Commerce and from 1923 at the State School of Industrial Art in Tallinn.

Paul Raud is represented with works in the Art Museum of Estonia, Tallinn.

== Family ==
His twin brother was the painter Kristjan Raud.
