= Kristjan Raud =

Estonian painter and illustrator (1865-1943)

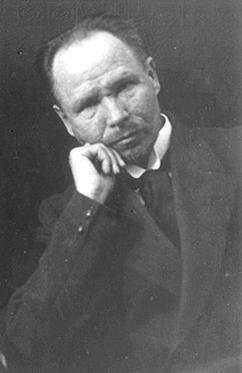
- Kristjan Raud, from Estonica (date unknown)
- Born: 22 October 1865; Kirikuküla, Governorate of Estonia, Russian Empire
- Died: 19 May 1943 (aged 77); Tallinn, then part of Generalbezirk Estland
- Education: Peter Janssen, Anton Ažbe
- Alma mater: Imperial Academy of Arts
- Style: Primitivism
- Relatives: Paul Raud (twin brother)
- Awards: "Kristjan Raud Year"

Kristjan Raud (22 October 1865, Kirikuküla, Vinni Parish – 19 May 1943, Tallinn) was an Estonian symbolist painter and illustrator who was one of the founders of the Estonian National Museum. Folklore elements figure heavily in his subject matter and his style is reminiscent of Primitivism.

== Biography ==
Raud and his brother Paul spent their early years in Meriküla, where their father was a field ranger. After his early death, they were enrolled at the parish school in Rakvere, where they were taught in German. Later, he went to the teachers' college in Tartu, and taught in the local schools there for several years.

In 1892, dissatisfied with his career, he moved to Saint Petersburg, where his drawings came to the attention of Johann Köler. He thought that Raud had some potential and advised him to enroll at the Imperial Academy of Arts. Four years later, after completing his studies, he went to Germany to polish his skills; spending time in Düsseldorf with Peter Janssen, then moving on to Munich, where he took private lessons from Anton Ažbe and classes at the Academy of Fine Arts.

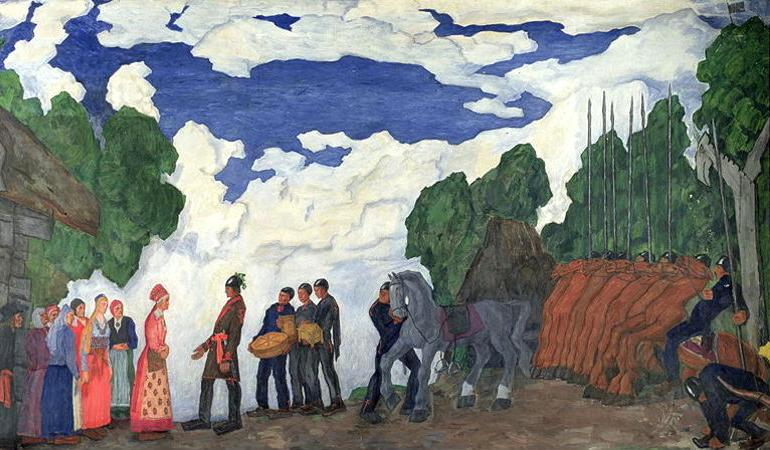
Kalev Proposes Marriage, from the Kalevipoeg

When he returned to Tartu in 1903, he organized a school for young artists, wrote articles for the local newspapers, and taught at the gymnasium. After the death of Jakob Hurt in 1907, he became an advocate for the establishment of a museum devoted to folklore. Two years later, he became one of the founders and organizers of the Estonian National Museum. The following year, he provided illustrations for the collected poems of Juhan Liiv.

At the beginning of World War I, he moved to Tallinn to live with his brother. Once again, he became a teacher while continuing to paint. In 1919, he completed The Maiden of the Grave, was elected Chairman of the Estonian Museum Society and began working for the Ministry of Education. In 1924 he left his position to devote himself entirely to his creative work, and a year later married a young woman aged 26, with whom he had three children.

The high point of his career came in 1935, when the Estonian Literary Society issued a new edition of Kalevipoeg, the Estonian national epic, with his paintings as illustrations. The first printing ran to 10,000 copies; a very large number at the time. In 1938, he was awarded the Order of the Estonian Red Cross.

In his monumental works Raud focuses on Nordic epics, for instance providing illustrations for the epic Kalevipoeg. His commitment to painting was such that, even on his death bed in the hospital, he continued to paint. He died during the German occupation so, despite his fame, his funeral was very modest.

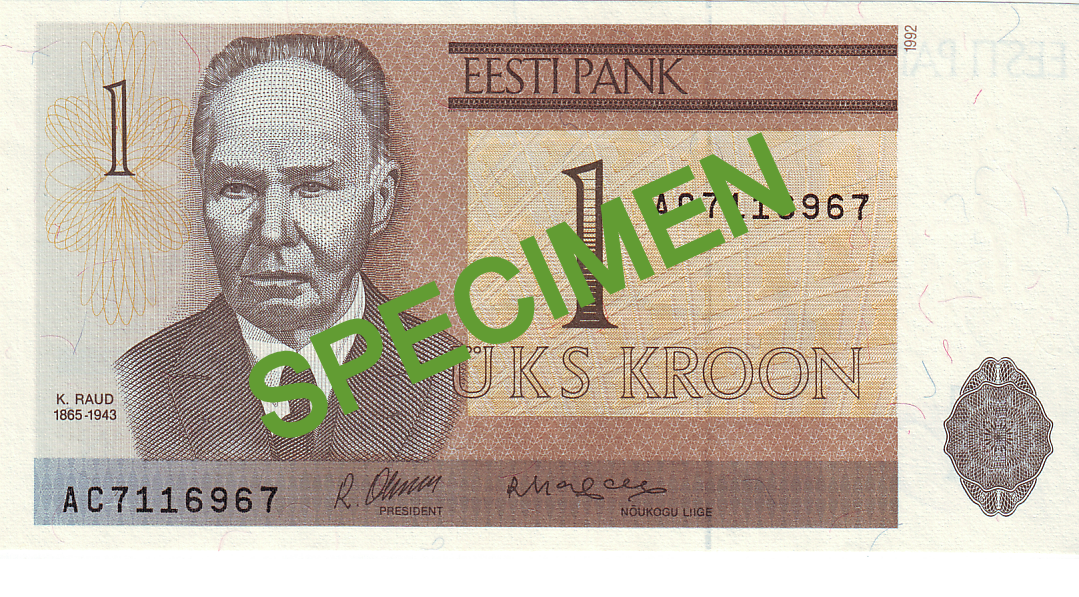
Portrait of Raud for 1 Estonian kroon

== Family ==
He was married to Elviira and they had at least one child.

His twin brother, Paul also became a well-known painter.

== Recognition ==
In the spring of 1940, shortly before the Soviet occupation, a major exhibition of his works was held and the government declared it to be "Kristjan Raud Year".

A monument to him was erected under the Soviet government in 1969. Four years later, the (Kristjan Raud Art Award) was established by the Estonian Artists' Association. As of 2012, the prize was worth 2,240 euros.

From 1992 to 2011, when Estonia adopted the euro, Raud's likeness was on the one kroon banknote.

== Selected paintings ==
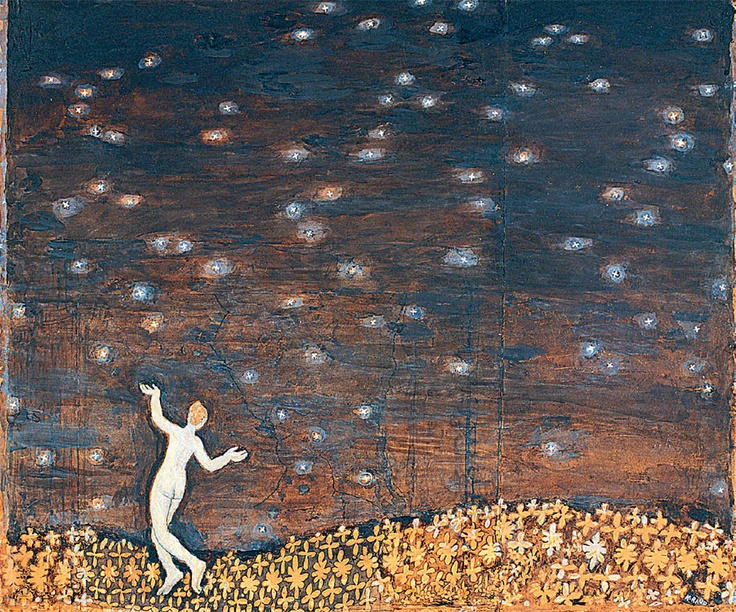
Under the Stars

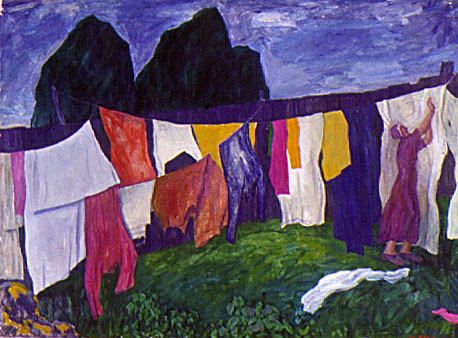
Laundry

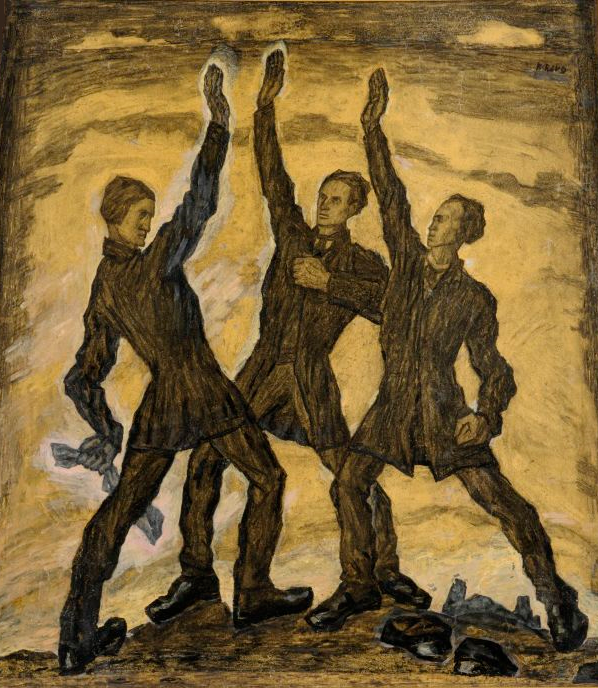
The Oath

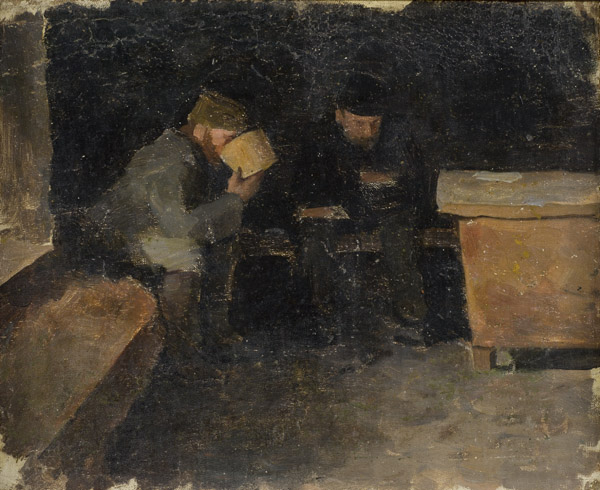
Hut

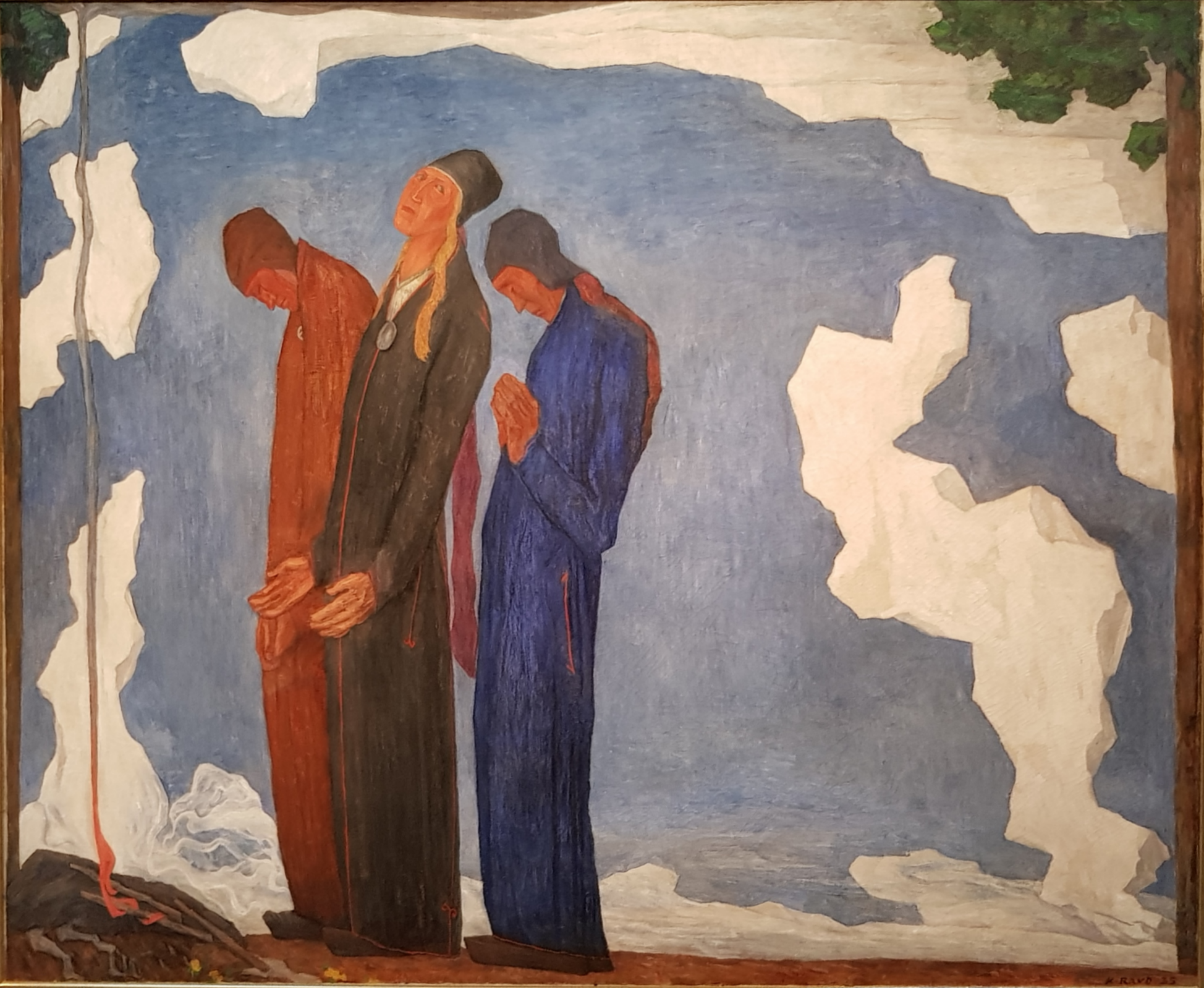
Martyr (or, Victim)

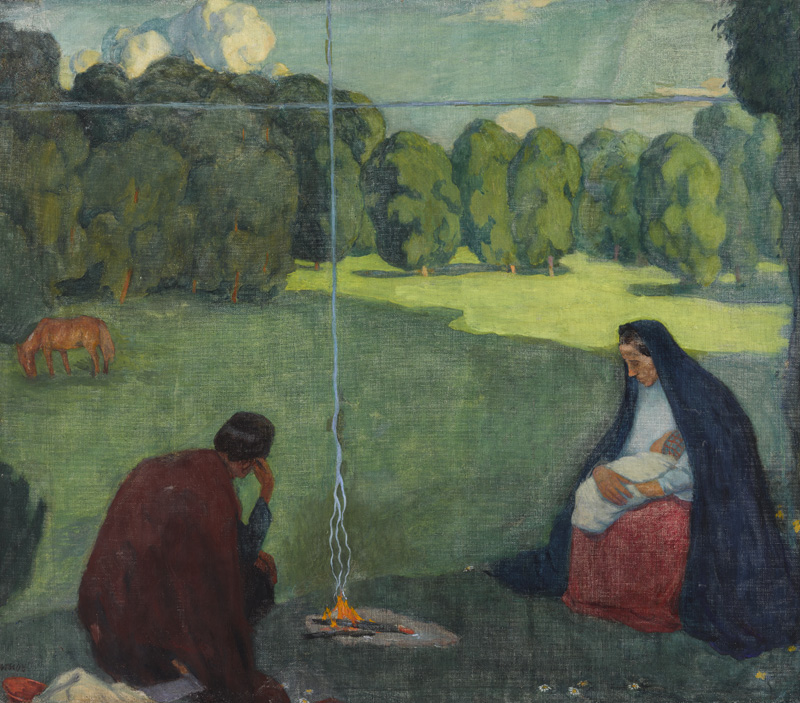
Rest on a Journey

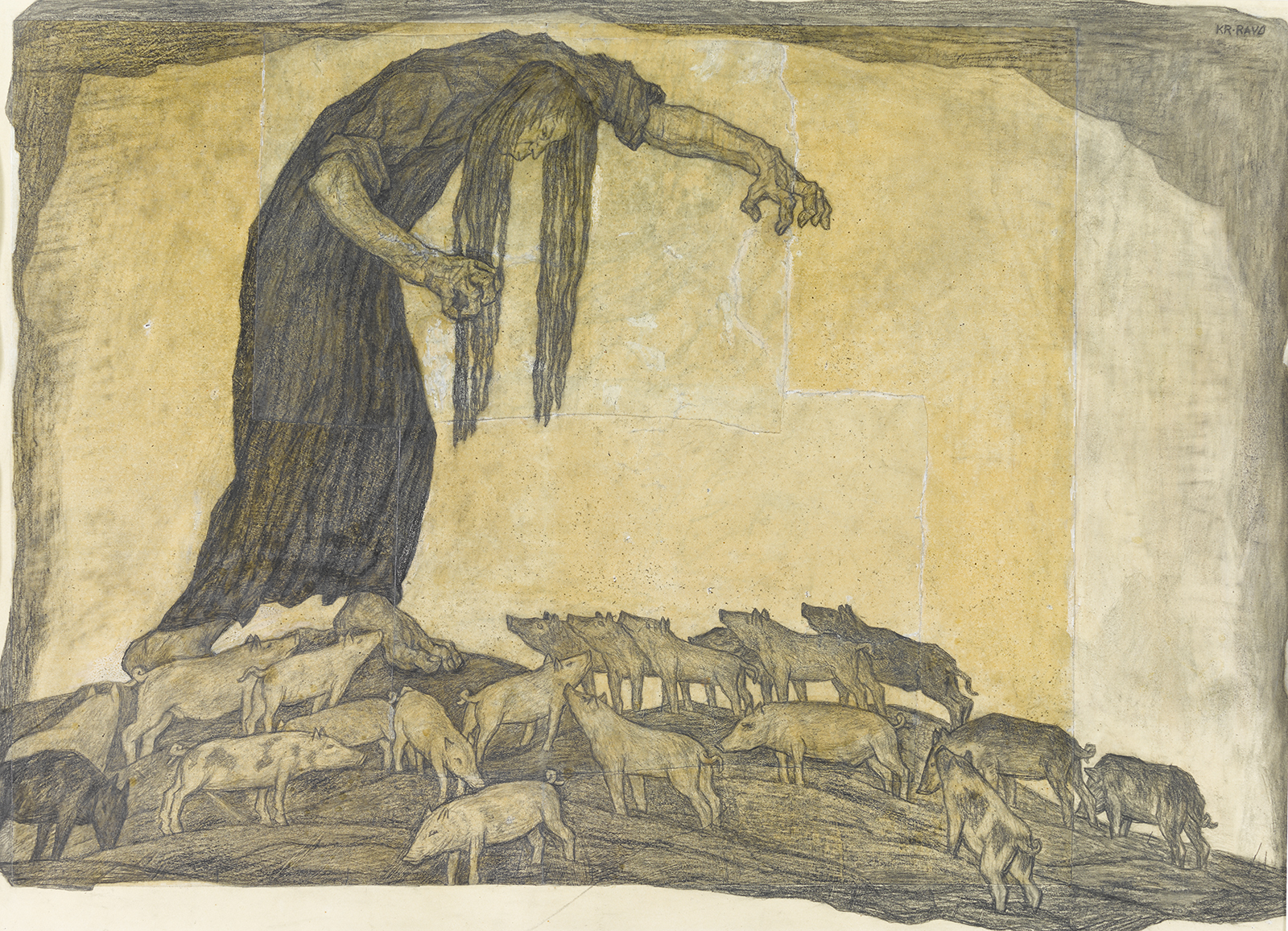
Witch and Piglets
