= Karl Menning =

Estonian theatre director and diplomat

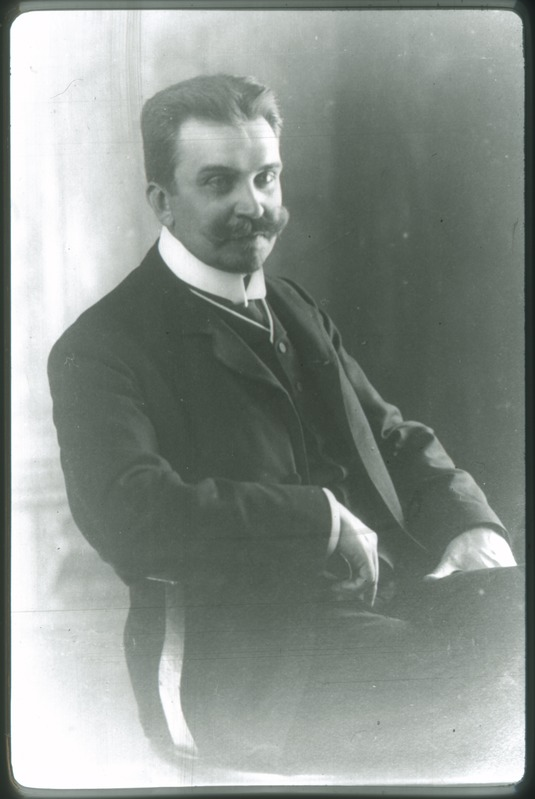
Karl Menning

Karl Menning (11 May 1874 in Tartu – 5 March 1941 in Tartu) was an Estonian theatre director, critic and diplomat.

In 1902, he graduated from University of Tartu's department of religion. In 1906-1914, he was the first theatre director of Vanemuine theatre.

From 1921 until 1933, he was the Estonian minister to Germany. In 1925, he was appointed the Estonian minister to Austria and in 1931 to Hungary. From 1934 until 1937, he was the Estonian minister to Latvia.

In Tartu, there is the monument to Menning. The monument was created by Mare Mikhof, and was erected in 2006.
