= Oskar Hoffmann (painter) =

Baltic German painter 1851-1912

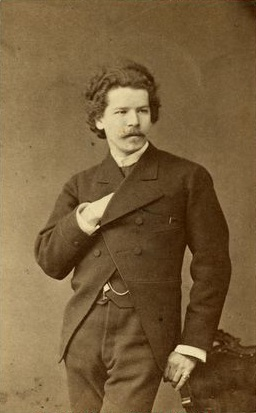
Oskar Hoffmann (before 1894)

Oskar Georg Adolf Hoffmann (Russian: Оскар Адольфович Гофман; 5 February 1851, Dorpat (Tartu, Estonia) – 3 March 1912, Novaya Derevnya, now part of Saint Petersburg, Russia) was a Baltic German painter from the Russian Empire. He was best known for his landscapes and colorful depictions of Estonian farmers.

== Biography ==
Hoffmann's father was a baker and members of his mother's family were involved in the performing arts. For a few years, he worked in a lithography and photography studio, which is where he first displayed his aptitude for painting. Many of his later works appear to be based on photographs taken during this period, especially the watercolor portraits.

He soon began exhibiting at the local art society and, in 1872, went to Germany, where he enrolled at the Kunstakademie Düsseldorf. In 1874, he briefly worked in the studios of Eduard von Gebhardt. His next professor was a fellow Baltic German from Estonia, Eugen Dücker. His primary influences, however, probably came from Gregor von Bochmann, who was only one year older, but had begun his studies in Düsseldorf at the age of eighteen. They also became lifelong friends.

He graduated from the Academy in 1877 and made a visit to Paris, where he worked with Fernand Cormon. The following year, he established his own studio in Düsseldorf and learned etching. In the early 1880s, he briefly returned to Dorpat then, possibly in debt, went to Saint Petersburg where, in 1884, he was granted the status of "Free Artist" by the Imperial Academy of Arts. While there, he continued to participate in international exhibitions in Vienna, Berlin and elsewhere.

== Selected paintings ==
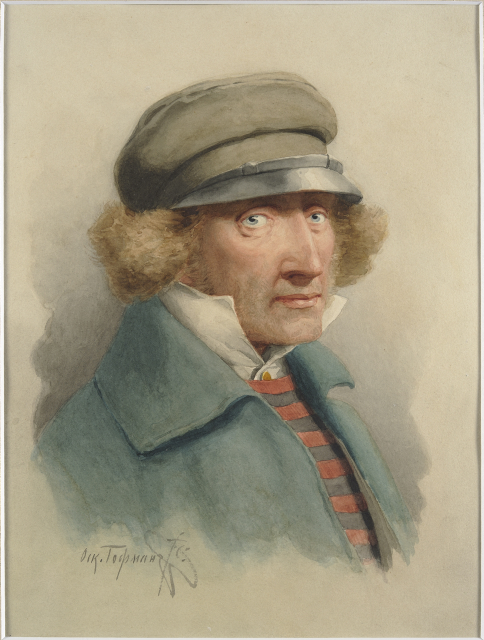
Estonian farmer with green coat

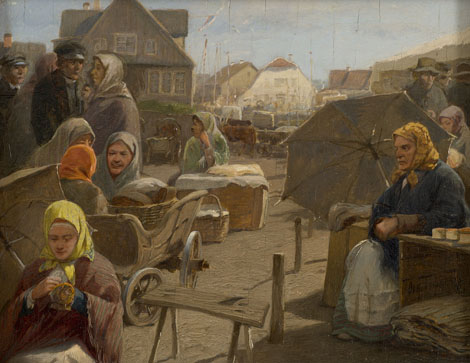
Market in Tartu

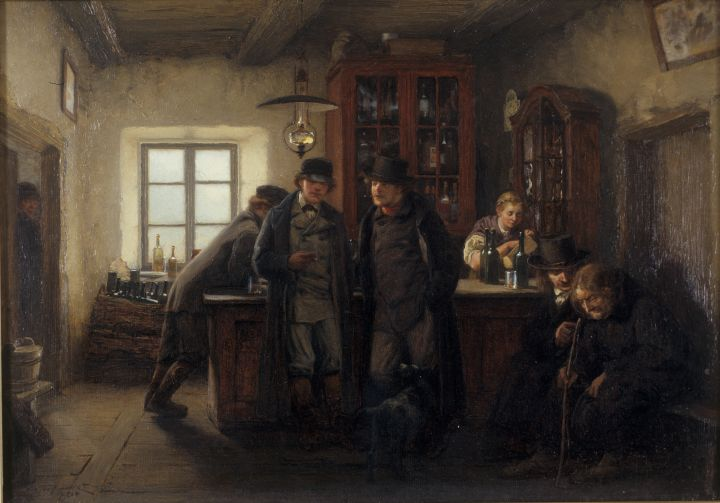
Farmers in an inn

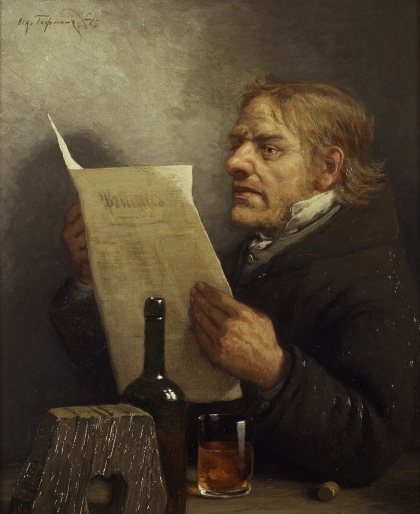
Estonian man reading a newspaper

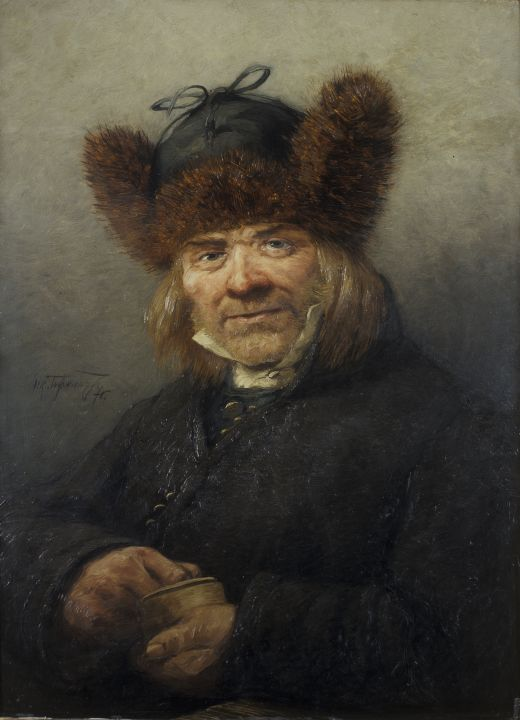
Farmer with a box of tobacco

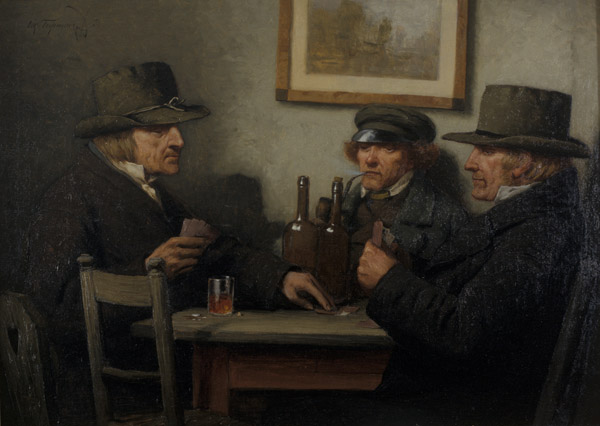
Farmers playing cards

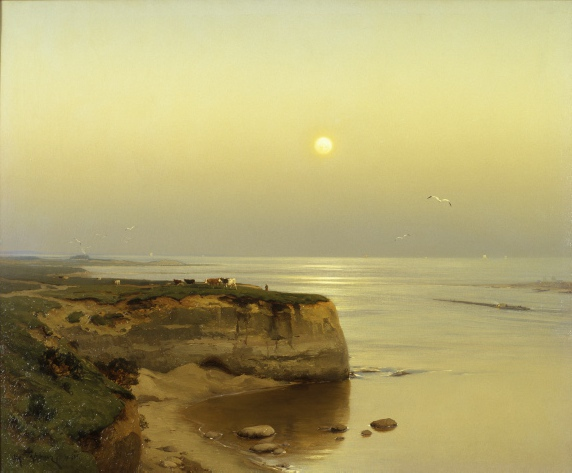
Northern Estonian seashore late in the evening
