= Kaarel Ird =

Estonian theatre leader, director, and actor

- Born: Kirill Irdt; August 27, 1909; Riga, Governorate of Livonia, Russian Empire (present-day Latvia)
- Died: December 25, 1986 (aged 77); Viljandi, then part of Estonian SSR, Soviet Union
- Occupations: Theatre director; actor

Kaarel Ird (27 August 1909 – 25 December 1986) was an Estonian theatre leader, director and actor.

Ird was born in Riga, and his theatrical career started in 1932 in Pärnu Töölisteater. Since 1940 he worked at Vanemuine Theatre, being most of time its stage manager, but in the meantime also its head.

From 1963 to 1971 and again from 1980 to 1985, Ird was a deputy of the Supreme Soviet of the Estonian Soviet Socialist Republic.

Kaarel Ird has remained in the history of Estonian theatre as a conflicted and contradictory personality. On the one hand, he was a powerful, explosive and dictatorial theatre director with a communist worldview, and on the other hand, he was a fervent defender of Estonian original heritage, which was condemned by the regime, the one who turned Vanemuine into a nationwide phenomenon and the guardian of the theatre renewal generation of the 1970s. He also preserved the last of German influenced theater in Estonia while other theaters were slowly influenced by russification policies.

In 1936, Ird wed the stage actress and theatre director Epp Kaidu. He died on 25 December 1986 in Viljandi.

== Awards ==
- Hero of Socialist Labor (1984)
- Two Order of Lenin
- Two Order of the Red Banner of Labor
- Order of the Badge of Honor
- Honored Artist of the Estonian SSR (1946)
- People's Artist of the Estonian SSR (1959) (Note: Teatralnaya Entsiklopediya (Russian: Театральная Энциклопедия) wrongly said he was awarded it in 1958. However, the decree awarding him the title was issued in 1959.)
- People's Artist of the USSR (1970)

== Selected filmography ==
- 1947 Life in the Citadel (feature film; role: Western agent)
- 1955 Andrus's Fortune (feature film; role: ?)
- 1973 An Unusual Story (feature film; role: prosecutor)
- 1974 The Red Violin (feature film; role: Broschowski)
