= Evald Hermaküla =

Estonian actor and director (1941–2000)

- Born: 6 December 1941; Maardu, then part of Generalbezirk Estland, Reichskommissariat Ostland
- Died: 16 May 2000 (aged 58); Kadriorg Park, Tallinn, Estonia
- Resting place: Metsakalmistu
- Occupations: Actor; director
- Years active: 1962–2000
- Spouse(s): Liina Orlova (m. 1978; div. 1988) Kaie Mihkelson

Evald Hermaküla (6 December 1941 – 16 May 2000) was an Estonian actor and director.

== Early life and education ==
Hermaküla was born in the village of Maardu. In 1965 he graduated from the University of Tartu in geology. In 1965 he also finished his studies at Vanemuine Theatre Studio in Tartu.

== Career ==
From 1962 he was an actor and from 1969 a stage director in Vanemuine theatre. He also directed and appeared as an actor films and television.

== Personal life and death ==
He was married to the actress Kaie Mihkelson.

Hermaküla committed suicide by hanging on 16 May 2000 in Kadriorg Park in Tallinn, aged 58. He was buried in Tallinn's Forest Cemetery.

== Selected filmography ==
- 1965: Me olime 18-aastased
- 1965: Mäeküla piimamees
- 1966: Tütarlaps mustas
- 1968: Libahunt
- 1970: Tuulevaikus
- 1985: Puud olid...
- 1985: Naerata ometi
- 1986: Saja aasta pärast mais
- 1986: Õnnelind flamingo
- 1987: Ringhoov
- 1988: Doktor Stockmann. I part
- 1988: Doktor Stockmann. II part
- 1989: Regina
- 1990: Teenijanna
- 1991: Surmatants
- 1993: Õnne 13
- 1994: Victoria (Ühe armastuse lugu). I part
- 1994: Victoria (Ühe armastuse lugu). II part
- 1997: Febris
