= Raivo Adlas =

Estonian actor and theatre director

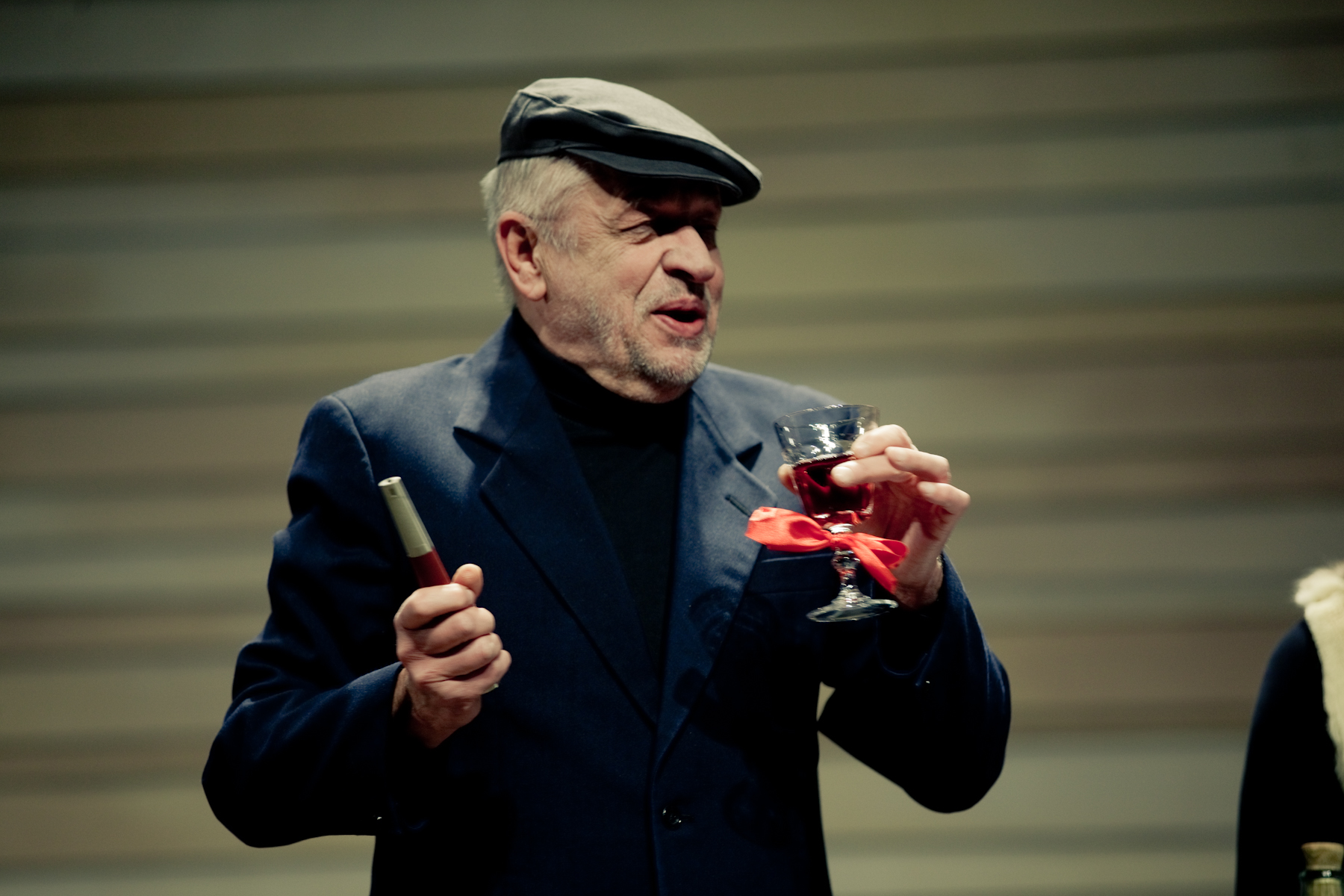
- Born: 31 January 1940

Raivo Adlas (born 31 January 1940 in Kiisa, Harju County) is an Estonian actor and theatre director.

In 1965 he graduated from the Vanemuine theatre's learning studio. 1968–1991 he worked at the Vanemuine. After that he was a theatre director at several studio theatres (e.g. in Sinimandria). 1993–1995 he worked at Endla Theatre. Since 1995 he is working again at Vanemuine Theatre. Besides theatre roles he has played also in several films and television series.

== Filmography ==
- 2013–: Naabriplika (television series; role: Sokrates)
- 2013: Hakkab jälle pihta
- 2014: Ööliblikad
- 2016: Õnn tuleb magades (feature film; in role: teacher Lokk)
- 2016: Polaarpoiss (feature film; in role: court psychiatrist)
- 2019: Klassikokkutulek 3: Ristiisad (feature film; in role: Aksel)
