= August Wiera =

Estonian theatre personnel

August Daniel Wiera (28 March 1853 Jaama manor, near Tartu – 26 March 1919 Tartu) was an Estonian theatre and music person. Under his guidance, the Vanemuine Cultural Society's theatre collective became semi-professional.

With Wiera's help, the Estonian theater became semi-professional and the group's membership grew to one hundred.

In 1878 he become the head of Vanemuine Cultural Society. Until 1903 he worked at Vanemuine Cultural Society. Until 1913 he worked mostly at Bürgermusse.

He was the first in Estonia to introduce the new genre of music theatre.

== Works ==
- Jannsen's "Pärmi-Jago unenägu" (1873)
- Kivi's "Viru Villemi viimne otsus" (1887)
- Conrad's "Õunapuu all" (1887)
