= Vanemuine =

Theatre in Tartu, Estonia

Coordinates: 58.3763412°N 26.724152°E

"Big house" of the Vanemuine

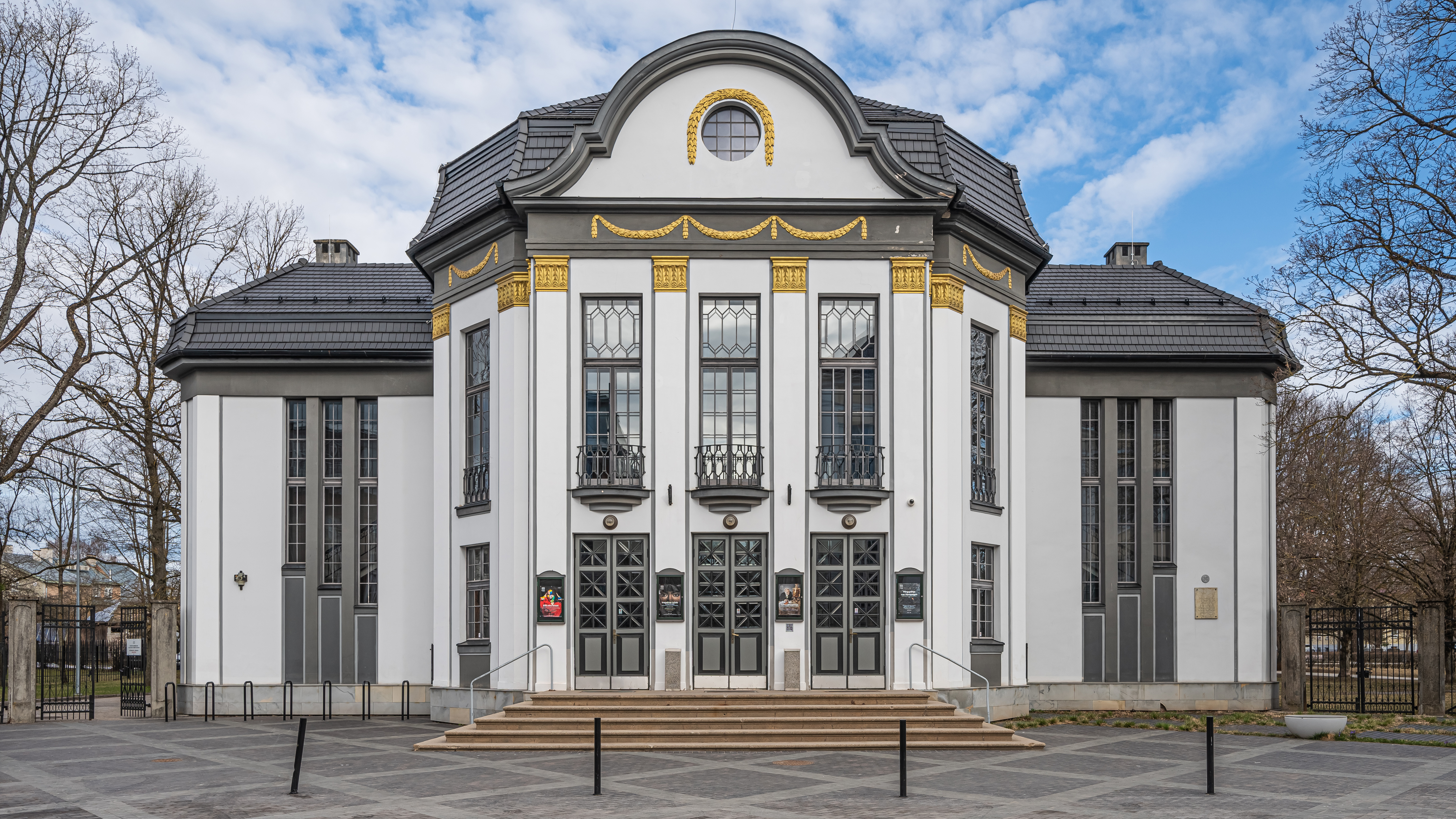
"Little house" of Vanemuine

Vanemuine (lit. 'Eldermost') is a theatre in Tartu, Estonia. It is the first Estonian-language theatre. Stemming from the Vanemuine Society (1865), the theatre's first performance was Lydia Koidula's Saaremaa Onupoeg ("The cousin from Saaremaa") at the society's fifth anniversary. In subsequent years, Vanemuine has expanded to include a symphony orchestra and ballet company, while its repertoire has included a range of operettas and music theatre through operas and dramas. Under Karl Menning, the theatre served a vocational purpose, with a great emphasis on educating future talent. Subsequent directors prioritized entertainment value, while Kaarel Ird—who led Vanemuine for more than forty years—oversaw a blend of genres as well as tours of the Soviet Union. In recent years, content has varied extensively.

Vanemuine has occupied a series of venues. The original Vanemuine Society House on Jaama Street operated for 33 years before being destroyed by fire in 1903. In 1906, it was replaced by a new hall designed by the Finnish architect Armas Lindgren at its current location. This venue was expanded in the 1930s to address technical issues, but destroyed by a bomb during World War II. Vanemuine returned in the former German Theatre of Dorpat in 1944; rebuilt after a 1983 fire, this theatre is today nicknamed the "little house". A 682-seat hall (the "big house") was completed in 1967, with the 842-seat Vanemuine Concert Hall following in 1970.

== History ==
=== 1870–1906: The Vanemuine Society House ===
Vanemuine was founded as the Vanemuine Society (Vanemuise Selts) on 24 June 1865, by Johann Voldemar Jannsen. In 1869, the Vanemuine Society organised the first song festival in Estonia. On 24 June 1870, the fifth anniversary of the society, Lydia Koidula's play Saaremaa Onupoeg ("The cousin from Saaremaa") was performed at the Society House on Jaama Street; this is considered the first Estonian-language play. This performance, adapted from a similarly titled work by Theodor Körner, featured backdrops by a painter named Frischmuth, and opened with a farmyard scene featuring three actors: Heinrich Rosenthal, Harry Janssen, and Tõnis Pekk. The play drew popular acclaim, and thus a second performance was scheduled for the following day. Koidula later directed two further plays, "Maret ja Miina ehk kosjakased" ("Maret and Miina or the Affiance Birches") and the original comedy "Säärane mulk ehk sada vakka tangusoola".

Theatrical activities became more consistent in 1874, after photographer Reinhold Sachker became director. A member of the Vanemuine Society and active actor, Sachker ensured the survival of the theatre and reinforced its tradition of theatre. Sachker translated plays by the German dramatist August von Kotzebue, and commonly employed the craftsmen of Tartu as his actors.

In 1878, August Wiera was selected by the Vanemuine Society as its song, orchestra and stage director, in return for a percentage of the events' income. At a peak time of russification, Wiera gathered around him a large group of people interested in Estonian music and plays. In his memoir From the "Vanemuine" Paths, the actor Leopold Hansen described Wiera as a very energetic individual who "assembled in himself several stage specialties", being a music, ballet and play director, as well as vocal coach. By the middle of the 1880s, the Vanemuine company already had 100 members and performances were held on a regular basis. Wiera had two stage directors to help develop the theatre: Ludvig Menning (years 1878–1886) and Hugo Techner (1886–1891), who mostly took on drama productions. Wiera himself brought music to the Estonian theatre – under his baton the first Estonian language music production, Karl Maria von Weber's "Preziosa" (1883), was brought on stage. Wiera later directed several operettas, with the company's first opera being an adaptation of Étienne Méhul's "Joseph in Aegypten". Other adaptations included Estonian-language versions of Molière's The Miser (1888) and Shakespeare's The Merchant of Venice (1888) and The Taming of the Shrew (1889).

During this period, the stage was expanded and the society hall was decorated. At the expense of an A. Grenzstein, two fountains were installed, one to each side of the stage; however, these were purely ornamental, as the water would damage the orchestra's instruments. Wiera led the theatre through 1903, when his vision of theatre began to clash with those of rising Estonian intellectuals. After the Vanemuine Society House was destroyed by fire in 1903, his contract was not renewed.

=== 1906–1914: Estonian vocational theatre ===
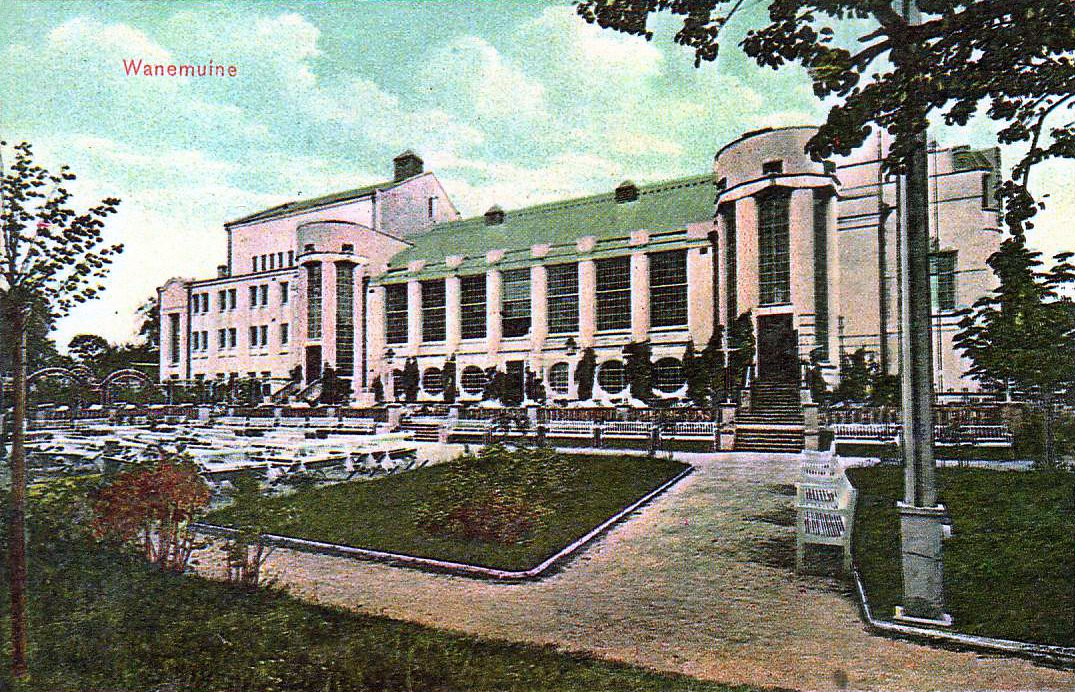
Vanemuine theatre, c. 1910

Requiring a new theatre, the Vanemuine Society retained the Finnish architect Armas Lindgren to design its new hall. Located on Aia Street (now Vanemuise Street), this theatre was funded extensively through donations. the interior was heavily ornamented, with A. Weizenberg's sculptures "Dawn" and "Dusk" sitting at the top of the lobby staircase railings. The gardens were completed by 1907. On the occasion of the building's opening, August Kitzberg wrote in the Postimees: "The house has a character of its own; the plan maker, building artist, has put something in it, has managed to say something with it. We feel tunes within ourselves touched that are somewhat familiar, immanent to us – that stand in accord with ourselves. The house, with its two powerful towers on the streetside, reminds us of something heavy, long lasting, steady, something that is not to be crushed easily, that will not bend, and that wants to protect itself. While the artist has this way given the house the power and influence of a monumental building from the street side, the garden side of the building is light, open, and happy on the contrary, something that exposes itself to beauty and sun." (Postimees, 12 August 1906).

Operations began before the venue was completed. On 13 August 1906, three years after the Vanemuine Society House was destroyed, a new theatre opened its doors. This institution, a vocational theatre, was under the direction of Karl Menning. Educated in Estonia, Germany, and Western Europe, Menning chose Kitzberg's play Tuulte pöörises ("In the Whirl of Winds") as the company's inaugural performance. It soon became clear that the building was poorly suited to performances. The lack of audience risers made performances uncomfortable; acoustics were bad, as was lighting.

Menning brought different direction to the company, forefronting the educational goals of theatre. Instead of operettas, which he considered to be dangerous to the good taste of actors and the audience, Menning promoted the establishment of the Vanemuine Symphony Orchestra (1908). The orchestra's inaugural performance, under Samuel Lindpere, took place on 7 May 1908. In theatre, Menning emphasized psychological realism, moving away from Wiera's prompters in favour of actors' inner and external incarnation into the role. All components of production were supposed to educate the audience ethically, aesthetically and morally. To this extent, Menning also organised play interpretation nights and performed there with various presentations himself. When his opponents demanded a lighter and more entertaining repertoire, Menning refused. In 1914, after a meeting of the Society board, he announced his retirement; he later moved to Tallinn.

=== 1914–1944: Stagnancy and rebirth ===
After Menning's departure, the management of the Vanemuine theatre was given to Ants Simm, who served as artistic director and head stage between during 1914 and 1921. Under Simm, Vanemuine's repertoire was dominated by operettas and comedies, By 1916, eleven of the company's twenty-one actors had left, including several who disagreed with the focus on popular entertainment. (Note: These actors established the Pandorini troupe (now the Estonian Drama Theatre) in Tallinn.) The orchestra, conversely, grew rapidly under head conductor Juhan Aavik; in 1915, for example, it held 95 performances, including several in the garden.

Following Simm's departure, Vanemuine was run by a committee of actors. Between 1925 and 1931, Voldemar Mettus led the troupe; he was followed by August Sunne until 1934. Thespians such as August Sunne, Eduard Türk, Rudolf Ratassepp, Anna Markus, and Mari Möldre regularly performed works of music theatre. However, viewership declined; by the early 1930s, it was common for less than one-third of seats to be filled. Although the theatre received state support, debts grew rapidly as major decisions left to the Society. This drew criticism from the intelligentsia; for instance, a 1929 memorandum signed (among others) by August Annist, Alfred Koort, Andrus Saareste, Juhan Sütiste, Juhan Semper, Gustav Suits, Aino Suits, Elo Tuglas, and Friedebert Tuglas decried the "abnormal situation" and threatened the establishment of a new company.

In 1935, the Vanemuine Society's control of creative decisions ended. Otto Aloe became the new theatre director, with Eino Uuli as the opera director, Ida Urbel as the director of movement, and Kaarli Aluoja as the drama director, while Juhan Simm and Eduard Tubin served as conductors. While operettas were still performed, serious drama pieces and operas were also billed. In 1939, the Vanemuine ballet company held its first full-length production: "The Carnival Suite“ to the music of Tchaikovsky. During this time, efforts were made to renovate the building and correct its flaws. In late 1939, the new 500-seat theatre hall and stage were completed; it introduced several technical innovations as well as audience risers. The former hall, meanwhile, was rebuilt into a concert hall.

During the German occupation, the theatre remained open under the leadership of Aleksander Eller. Theatre attendance was high, with a production of Eduard Tubin's Kratt ("The Womble", 1943) drawing much fanfare. However, in August 1944, the theatre (then showing "Tartu") was hit by a bomb and was destroyed.

=== 1944–1968: Vanemuine in Soviet Estonia ===
After the end of World War II, the Vanemuine troupe took over the former German Theatre of Dorpat building (the current Vanemuine "little house"), which had been converted into a cinema. Members reconstructed the building with their own resources, and on 21 December 1944 they held their inaugural performance. The Vanemuine ballet company also had to be reformed, for many dancers had left Estonia. Nonetheless, in 1946 Sergei Prokofiev's Romeo and Juliet reached the stage. Not all of these activities fit within the building; as such, workshops and rehearsal rooms were located in neighbouring buildings. Plans to rebuild the former building, though made, never came to fruition; ultimately, an entirely new building was constructed.

Kaarel Ird became the theatre's artistic director, taking on the role of head stage director in 1960; over the next forty years, he led the troupe for three terms: 1944–1948, 1949–1950 and 1955–1985. Artistic directorship was also taken by Andrei Poljakov (1950–1953), who did not speak Estonian, and by Ants Lauter (1953–1955), during periods in which Ird was removed from his role. Ird, having a background in the Tartu Drama Theatre Society's Theatre Art Studio and the Pärnu and Tartu Workers' Theatre, was generally considered a suitable candidate by the rulers of Soviet Estonia. For his part, Ird felt that it was necessary to restore Vanemuine. In a private letter to Olaf Utt, he wrote, "For me, the Vanemuine theatre was part of the Estonian culture ... valuable and sacred as the Museum of Literature, Museum of Ethnography, the library of a university." Should he abandon it, "there wouldn't be a single person who could sustain the theatre's level. And I even don't know whether I can do that. Especially under the circumstances when we receive little to no help at all." (1966)

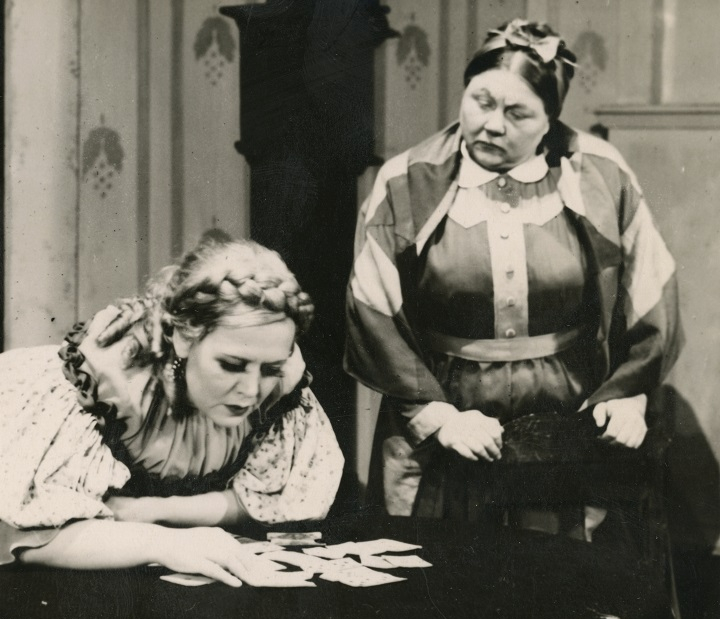
Epp Kaidu and Alli Tammemets in a 1947 production of a Gogol play at the Vanemuire theatre

Ird continued the established traditions at the Vanemuine, with ballet thriving in the new conditions. In his numerous speeches and publications, Ird repeatedly brought up Menning's ideals: psychological realism, ensemble-play principle, and the development of national dramaturgy. At the same time, the ruthless ideologization of repertoire, whereby "Soviet" and political plays were favored, drove audiences away from the theatre. Seasons were tense, and by the beginning of the 1950s musical theatre was disappearing. Neither was the ballet company left untouched by social changes; ideology strongly influenced the language of dance, and layoffs reduced the number of dancers to eighteen — a number insufficient for most classical compositions.

In 1956, soon after Ird returned to the position of drama director, members of Vanemuine were given the opportunity to present Estonian art and literature in Moscow. After a successful performance, the theatre was designated the Estonia SSR National Theatre Vanemuine. Another travelling performance, to Kiev, followed in 1957. The Literaturnaya Gazeta wrote, "Certainly, we do not favour the blind copying of the Vanemuine Theatre, although it truly is a good theatre with a highly progressive culture. We would rather see that we also raised such actors who could pass along our nation's virtuosity in all its richness and peculiarity on stage. Such thoughts sprung up at the performance of the Estonian art masters that – we repeat – offered great pleasure and aesthetical satisfaction to the Ukrainian theatre guests." (Literaturnaya Gazeta, Kiev). In 1960, the Vanemuine presented E. Kapp's Talvemuinasjutt ("Winter Fairytale"), Gustav Ernesaks' Tuleristsed ("Baptism of Fire") and B. Kõrver's Laanelill ("Winter Green") at the Moscow Kreml Theatre.

This success was followed by a period of stability at the beginning of the 1960s, wherein core members remained with the company for years at a time. Ird also established the Vanemuine study studios to train new generations of performers. Alumni of the first studio, which began in 1961, included such actors as Evald Aavik, Raivo Adlas, and Evald Hermaküla; three more classes graduated in later years. Works in the company's repertoire included Soviet plays, Estonian plays (by writers such as Juhan Smuul, Raimond Kaugver, Egon Rannet, August Kitzberg, and Ardi Liives), as well as world classics (Shakespeare, Brecht) are being staged. During this period, musical productions were staged mostly by theatre's own employed directors. As ideological control weakened during the late 1960s, the Vanemuine found a common language with the audience even as the company continued to travel around the Soviet Union and host Union-wide meetings and seminars. In 1966, the Vanemuine was denominated as an academic theatre.

The new theatre hall, designed by A. Volberg, P. Tarvas and U. Tölpus, with interior design by V. Tamm, was finally completed in 1967; its inaugural performance occurred on 3 November 1967. This 682-seat venue was renovated in 2012. Meanwhile, in 1970, the 842-seat Vanemuine Concert Hall was opened.

=== 1969–1985: End of the Ird period ===
At the end of the 1960s, Vanemuine became the centre of innovation in Estonian theatre. The new generation promoted a modern vision of theatre that disavowed the canon and sought new approaches. In Vanemuine, young directors such as Jaan Tooming and Evald Hermaküla brought to stage A. Kitzberg's Laseb käele suud anda (Allows to Kiss on the Hand) and P. E. Rummo's Tuhkatriinumängu ("A Cinderella Play"). In dance theatre, a similar push came from Ülo Vilimaa ("Contrasts", 1967; "Hands", 1973; "Mermaid", 1974). Another ideologist was future director Mati Unt, who then worked at the theatre's literature department. Directors changed plays' texts to reflect their own ideas more suitably; productions were more physical and filled with symbols and metaphors. The younger theatre audience embraced the novel theatre quickly, while more conservative audiences were reluctant. Officials were likewise hesitant; "A Cinderella Play" was not given staging permission, and Ird required almost a year to secure permission after a censor blocked the performance following a dress rehearsal. Censorship remained a problem for several decades.

During this period, Ird remained supportive of young directors. Although their theatre did not suit his preferences, he defended them when needed, a situation that his supporters described as unprecedent. Others have suggested that Ird, being concerned about the continuation of Estonian theatre, did not defend so much the innovation as the talents promoting them. Ird remained a prominent director with Vanemuine, with successful productions including Külavahelaulud ("Village Songs", 1972) and Tagahoovis ("In the Back Yard", 1974). As per Ird's vision, nearly half of the Vanemuine repertoire consisted of Estonian dramaturgy, both new Estonian plays as well as classics and theatrical representations. By 1972, it had become the most visited theatre in Estonia; between 1978 and 1981, the theatre averaged 256,000 visitors per year.

The Vanemuine company continued its tours through the 1970s and 1980s, with destinations including the German Democratic Republic (1971, 1973), Hungary (1972), Finland (1974), and Sweden (1983). Important were the 1971 tour to Leningrad and the guest performances of 1975 in Moscow. Critical reception remained positive, and in 1979 Vanemuine was selected to represent Soviet theatre at the Belgrade International Theatre Festival. Organizers wished to see Põrgupõhja uus Vanapagan ("Hell's New Old Nick"), but as the hosts were unable to solve technical issues, Tagahoovis ("In the Back Yard") was performed instead.

The Vanemuine "little house" was severely damaged by a fire in 1978. Renovations were delayed, and the building was only reopened to the public in 1990.

=== 1985–present: post-Soviet years ===
In 1985, Ird's third term as drama director ended; he was succeeded by Ago-Endrik Kerge, who held the position until 1990. Vanemuine retained high standards and enjoyed a multitude of visitors. Kerge added to its repertoire successful productions in several genres; Jaan Tooming likewise had several successes through the late 1980s. In 1981, Vassili Medvedjev joined the Vanemuine ballet company, where he worked as a soloist and director. The head conductor from 1989 to 1999 was Endel Nõgene.

From 1990 through 1993, Vanemuine was managed by Linnar Priimägi, who prioritized classical items. His was a time of great contradictions and creative conflicts, and with the appointment of his successor Jaak Viller in 1994 the theatre's management system also changed: three artistic director positions were created, with Jüri Lumiste (1993–1999) started work as drama director, Ülo Vilimaa (1974–1997) as ballet director and Endel Nõgene (1987–1999) as music director. In 1997, Mare Tommingas became the theatre's ballet director.

During these years of transition, which included economic instability and the liberation of Estonia, Vanemuine lacked audiences. From 1994, it experienced an uphill struggle, which it weathered through core actors such as Liina Olmaru, Merle Jääger, and Raine Loo, as well as new directors such as Ain Mäeots (Susi / "Wolf", 1995) and Tiit Palu. During that period Mati Unt was a common guest director, while other successful productions were directed by Mikk Mikiver ("Twelve Angry Men", 1997;) and Finn Poulsen ("The Story of the Little Old Man", 1996). Nevertheless, by 2003, audiences had begun to dwindle again. Paul Mägi has been the music director and chief conductor of Vanemuine Theatre since 2011. Toomas Peterson became the theatre's general manager and Tiit Palu became the theatre's drama director in 2013.

Staff changes have been frequent since the early 2000s. Head conductors have included Mihkel Kütson (1999–2004, 2008–present), Hendrik Vestmann (2004–2006), and Toomas Vavilov (2006-2007). Drama was led by Ain Mäeots between 1999 and 2006, with Sven Karja taking the role from 2007 to 2010. Guest directors have come from abroad, including Barrie Rutter (United Kingdom) and Aljona Anohhina (Russia), as well as Estonia (Uku Uusberg, Ingomar Vihmar, Hendrik Toompere jn).

There has been a lot of movement among actors; in 2010 the company comprises 21 members. There are many guest directors Memorable drama roles have been made by Hannes Kaljujärv, Aivar Tommingas, Külliki Saldre, Merle Jääger, Jüri Lumiste, Riho Kütsar. Meanwhile, the Vanemuine ballet company has become very transnational since 2004; Estonian dance schools have been unable to produce enough dancers for the theatre.

As of 2017, the theatre has three stationary venues: the "big house", the "little house", and the Harbour Theatre. Additionally, plays for young audiences are performed at the Theatre House in the Tartu Toy Museum. It employs 363 people, including a 67-member symphony orchestra, a musical ensemble of 9 singers, a 22-member drama troupe, a 33-member ballet troupe, and a 33-member opera chorus. In 2016, Vanemuine had 161,647 visitors.
