= Wiera =

River in Germany

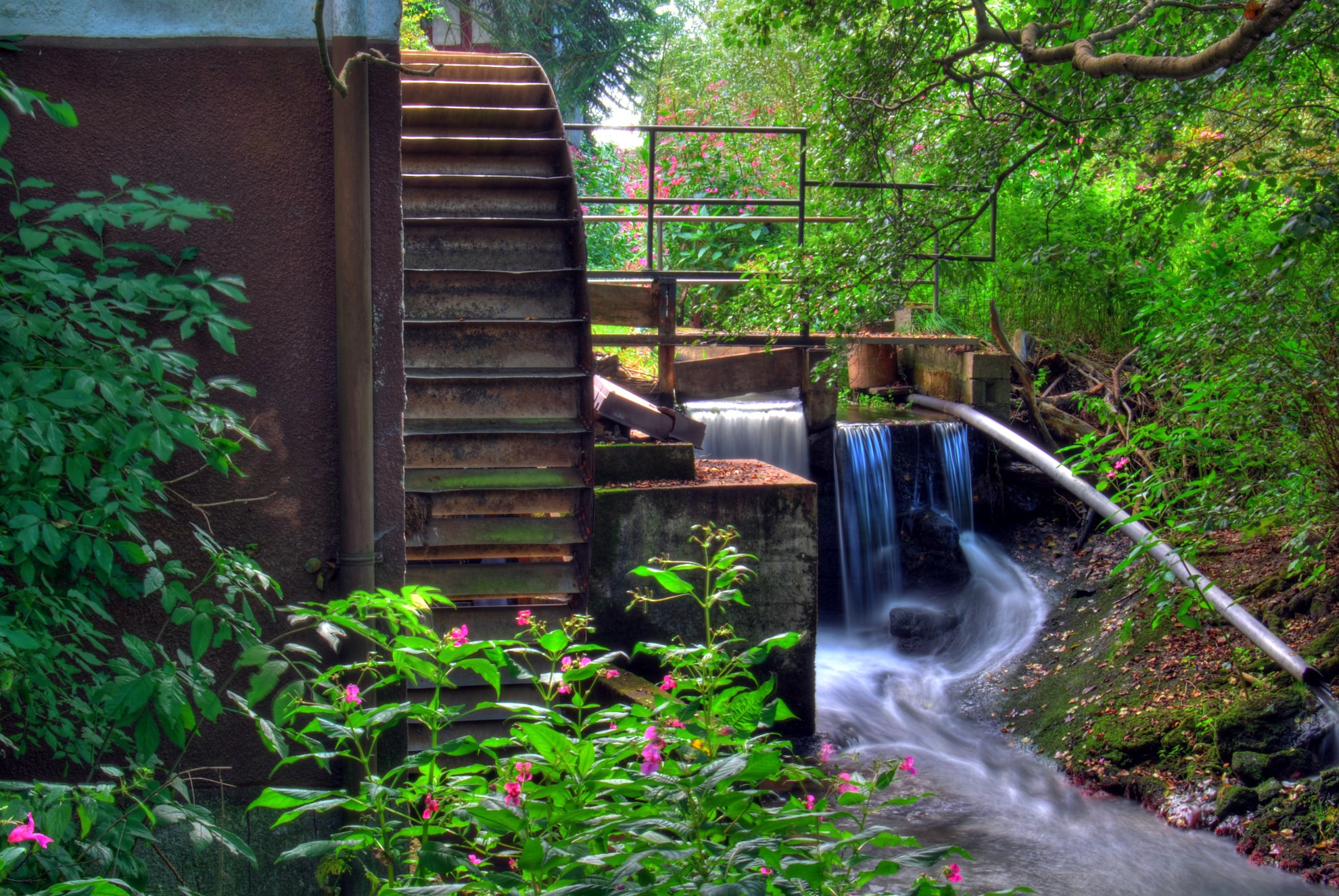

Location
- Country: Germany
- State: Hesse

Physical characteristics
- Mouth
  - location: Schwalm
  - coordinates: 50.9150°N 9.1806°E
- Length: 14.8 km (9.2 mi)

Basin features
- Progression: Schwalm→ Eder→ Fulda→ Weser→ North Sea

Wiera is a river of Hesse, Germany. It flows into the Schwalm in Treysa.

== See also ==
- List of rivers of Hesse
