= Kadriorg Park =

Park in Tallinn, Estonia

Coordinates: 59.439°N 24.793°E

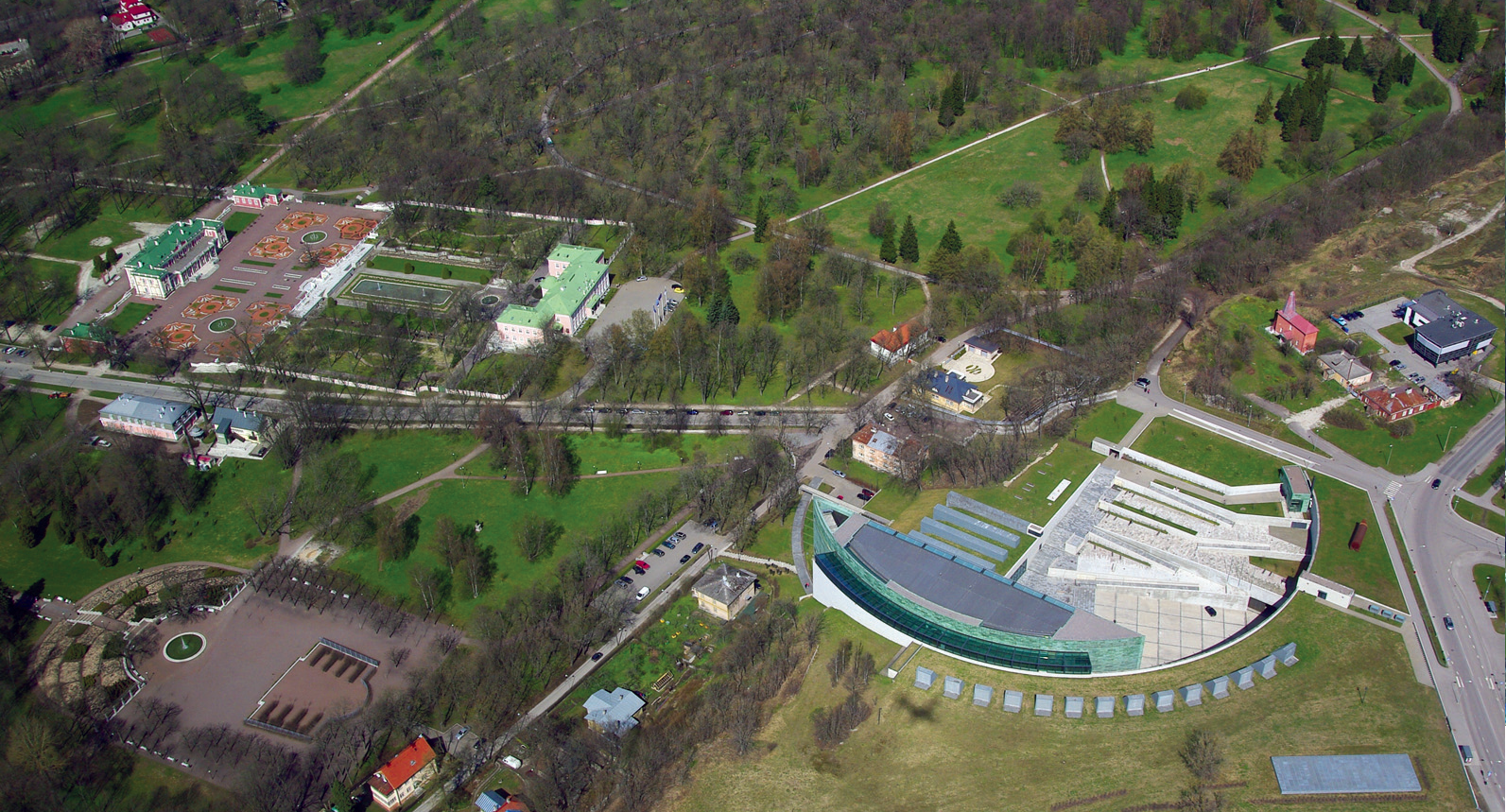
View to the Kadriorg Park (May 2010)

Kadriorg Park (Estonian: Kadrioru park) is a park in Kadriorg, Tallinn, Estonia. Its area is about 70 ha.

The park history started in 1718, when Peter the Great ordered to re-designate his areas at Fonnenthal Summer Manor.

The park's most notable water body is Swan Pond (Estonian: Luigetiik).

The park's newest part is Japanese Garden, which first stage was ended in 2011.
