= Sootaguse =

Sootaguse may refer to several places in Estonia:

- Sootaguse, Kadrina Parish, village in Lääne-Viru County, Estonia
- Sootaguse, Vinni Parish, village in Lääne-Viru County, Estonia
- Sootaguse, Väike-Maarja Parish, village in Lääne-Viru County, Estonia
