= Luusika Nature Reserve =

Protected area in Estonia

- Location within Estonia
- Location: Estonia
- Coordinates: 59°00′N 26°35′E
- Area: 442 ha (1,090 acres)
- Established: 1992 (2013)

Luusika Nature Reserve is a nature reserve which is located in Lääne-Viru County, Estonia.

The area of the nature reserve is 442 ha.

The protected area was founded in 1992 to protect valuable habitat types and threatened species in Luusika village (former Laekvere Parish).
