= Laekvere Parish =

Former municipality of Estonia

Coordinates: 59°03′56″N 26°33′56″E

Laekvere Parish Laekvere vald
- Former municipality of Estonia
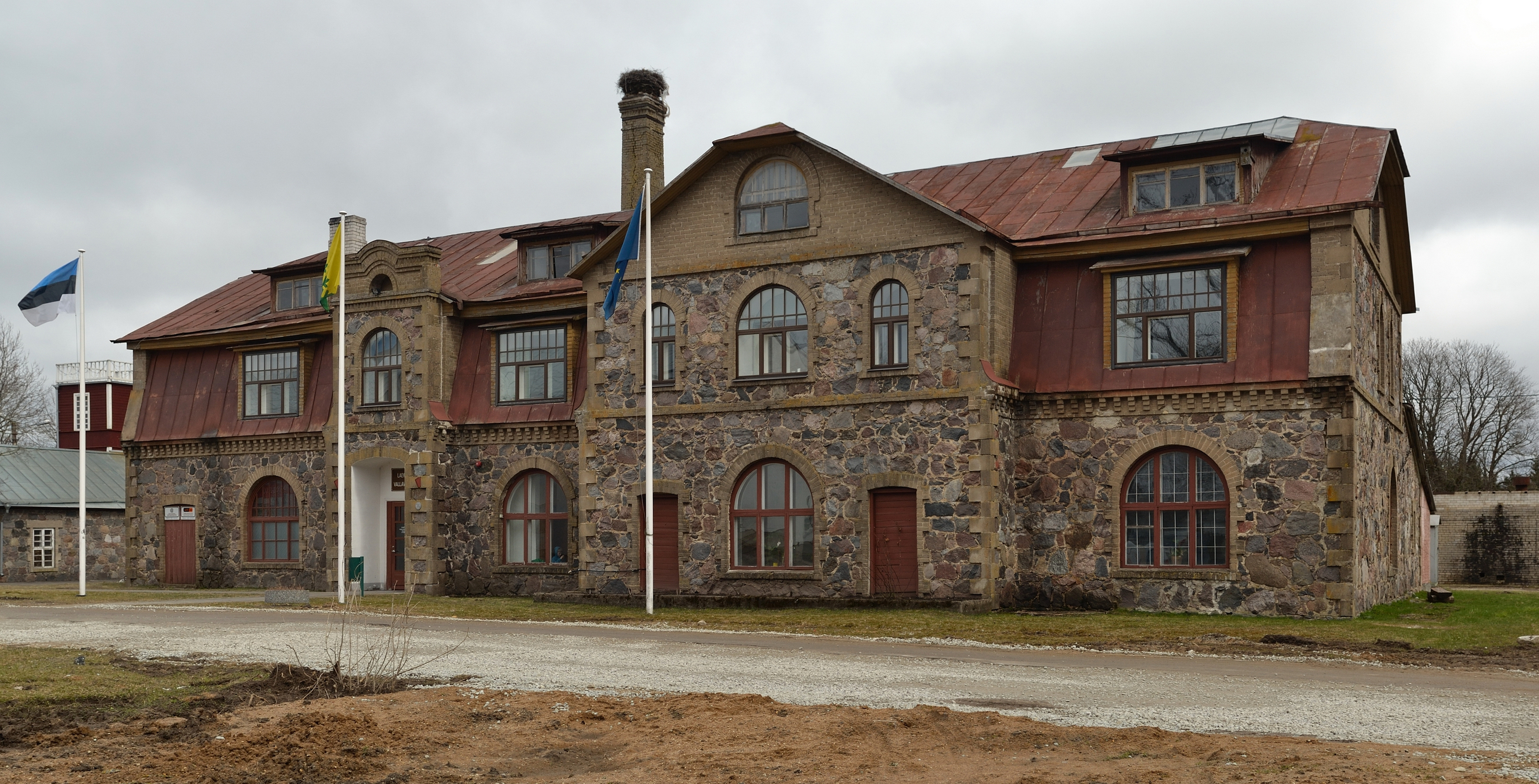
- Laekvere dairy

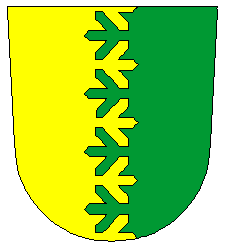
- Flag Coat of arms

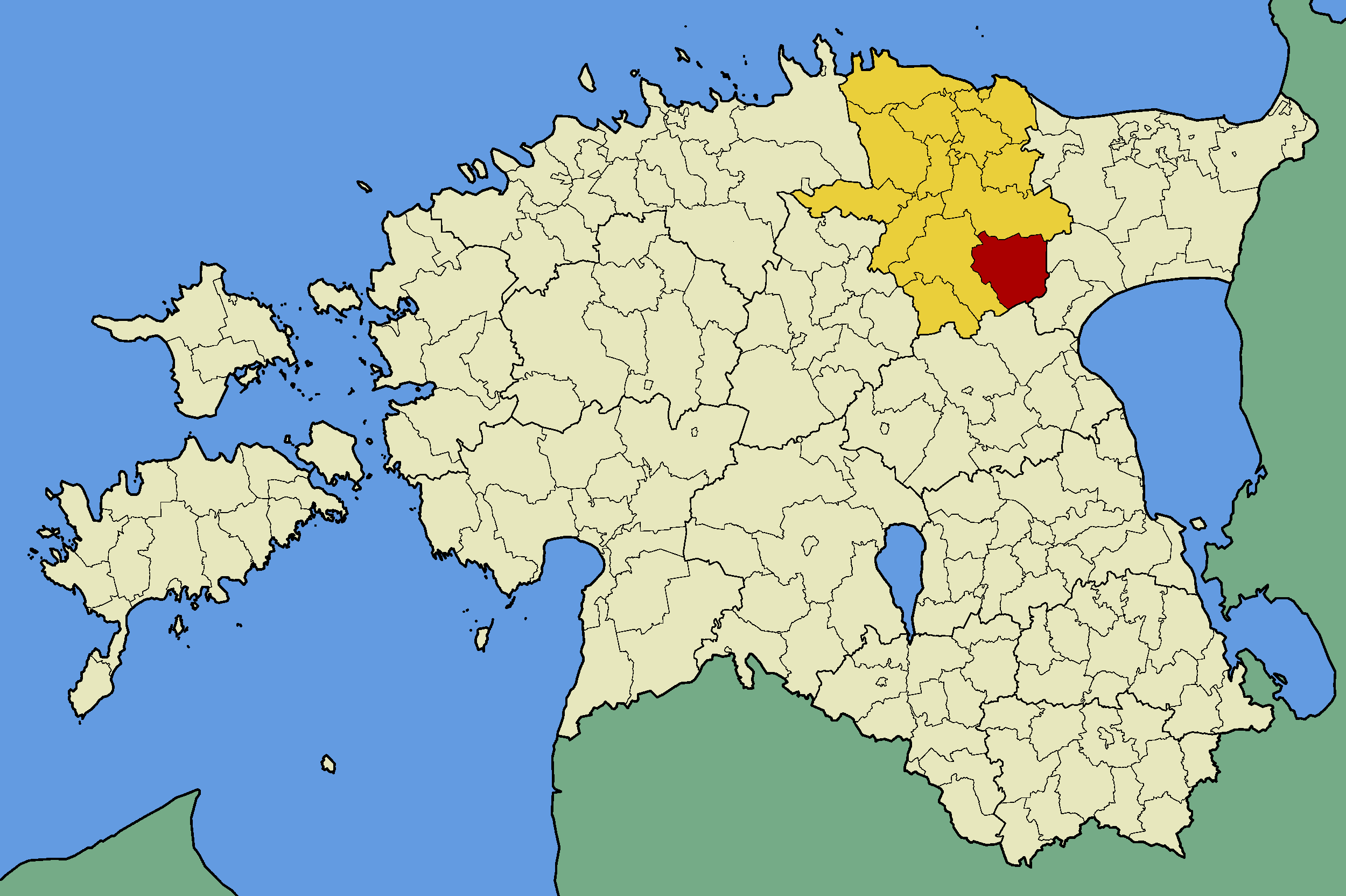
- Laekvere Parish within Lääne-Viru County.
- Country: Estonia
- County: Lääne-Viru County
- Administrative centre: Laekvere

Area
  - Total: 352.42 km^{2} (136.07 sq mi)

Population (2006)
  - Total: 1,837
  - Density: 5.213/km^{2} (13.50/sq mi)
- Website: www.laekvere.ee

Laekvere Parish (Estonian: Laekvere vald) was a rural municipality of Estonia, in Lääne-Viru County. It had a population of 1837 (2006) and an area of 352.42 km^{2}.

== Populated places ==
Laekvere Parish had 1 small borough and 18 villages.

Small borough

Laekvere

Villages

Alekvere (26), Arukse (27), Ilistvere (5), Kaasiksaare (37), Kellavere (8), Luusika (0), Moora (141), Muuga (276), Paasvere (209), Padu (49), Rahkla (172), Rajaküla (78), Rohu (68), Salutaguse (29), Sirevere (22), Sootaguse (2), Vassivere (36), Venevere (169).
