= Moora =

Moora may refer to:

- Moora, Western Australia, townsite in Australia
- Shire of Moora, Western Australia
- Moora, Estonia, village in Estonia
- Bog body called Moora, see Girl of the Uchter Moor
- Moora, surname
  - Harri Moora (1900–1968), Estonian archaeologist

== See also ==
- Moora Moora
