= Rohu, Estonia =

Village in Estonia

Rohu
- village
- Location in Estonia
- Coordinates: 59°05′38″N 26°28′21″E
- Country: Estonia
- County: Lääne-Viru County
- Municipality: Vinni Parish

Population (03.01.2011)
  - Total: 55

Rohu is a village in Vinni Parish, Lääne-Viru County, in northeastern Estonia. It's located about 5 km northwest of Laekvere and about 7 km northeast of Simuna. It has a population of 55 (as of 3 January 2011).

Estonia's most famous sumo wrestler Baruto Kaito grew up in Rohu village.
