= Venevere =

Venevere may refer to several places in Estonia:

- Venevere, Lääne-Viru County, village in Estonia
- Venevere, Viljandi County, village in Estonia
