= Alekvere =

Village in Estonia

Coordinates: 59°06′N 26°40′E

- Village
- Interactive map of Alekvere
- Country: Estonia
- County: Lääne-Viru County
- Parish: Vinni Parish
- Time zone: UTC+2 (EET)
  - Summer (DST): UTC+3 (EEST)

Alekvere is a village in Vinni Parish, Lääne-Viru County, in northeastern Estonia. Between 1992 and 2017 (until the administrative reform of Estonian municipalities) the village was located in Laekvere Parish.
