= Neeruti =

Neeruti may refer to several places in Estonia:

- Neeruti, Lääne-Viru County, village in Kadrina Parish, Lääne-Viru County
- Neeruti, Valga County, village in Otepää Parish, Valga County
