= Laekvere =

Borough in Estonia

- Small borough
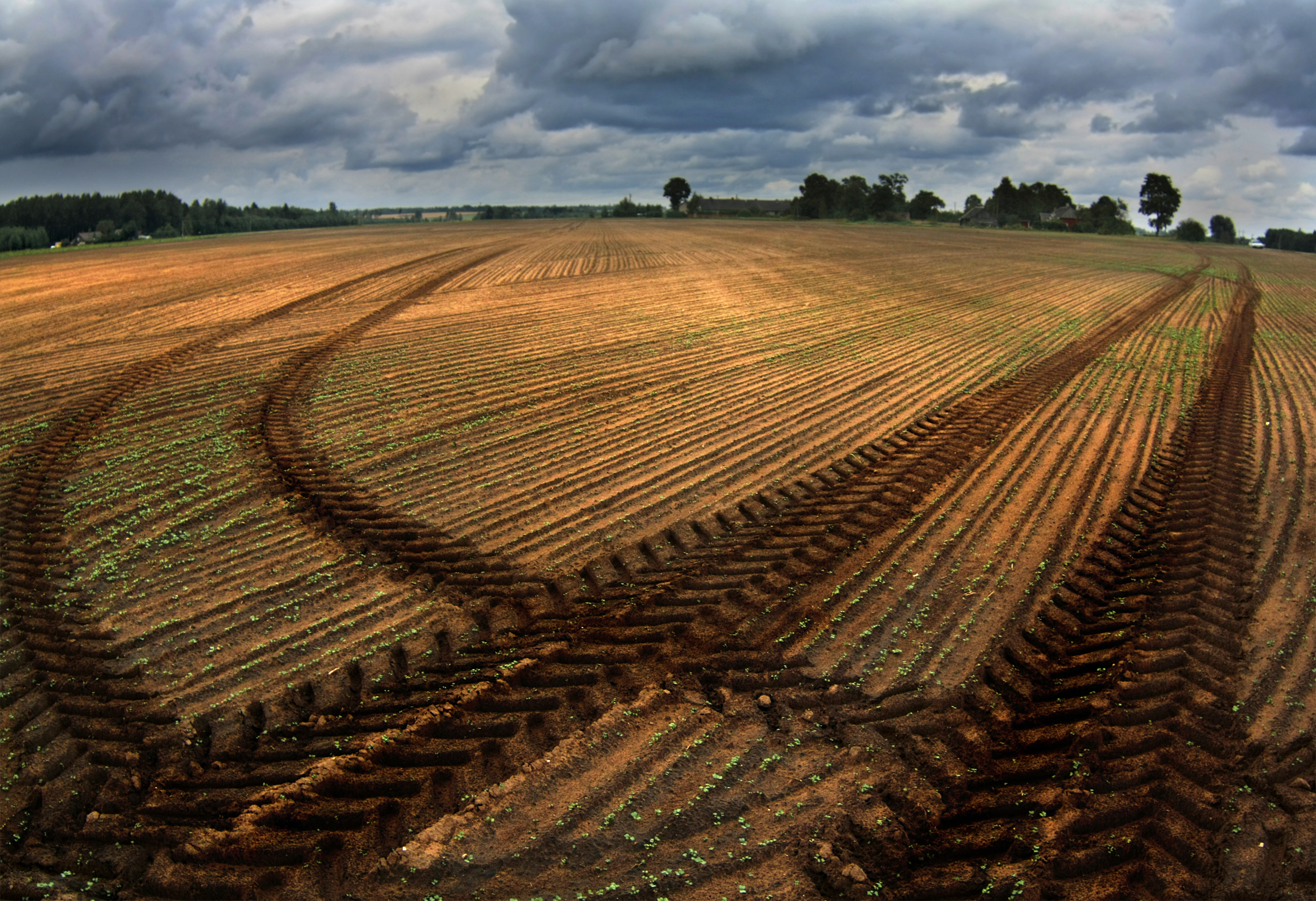
- Rapeseed field in Laekvere Parish

- Location in Estonia
- Coordinates: 59°04′07″N 26°33′32″E
- Country: Estonia
- County: Lääne-Viru County
- Municipality: Vinni Parish

Population (04.01.2010)
  - Total: 476

Laekvere (German: Ladigfer) is a small borough (Estonian: alevik) in Vinni Parish, Lääne-Viru County, Estonia. Between 1991–2017 (until the administrative reform of Estonian municipalities) Laekvere was the administrative centre of Laekvere Parish. Laekvere has a population of 476 (as of 4 January 2010).

== Images ==
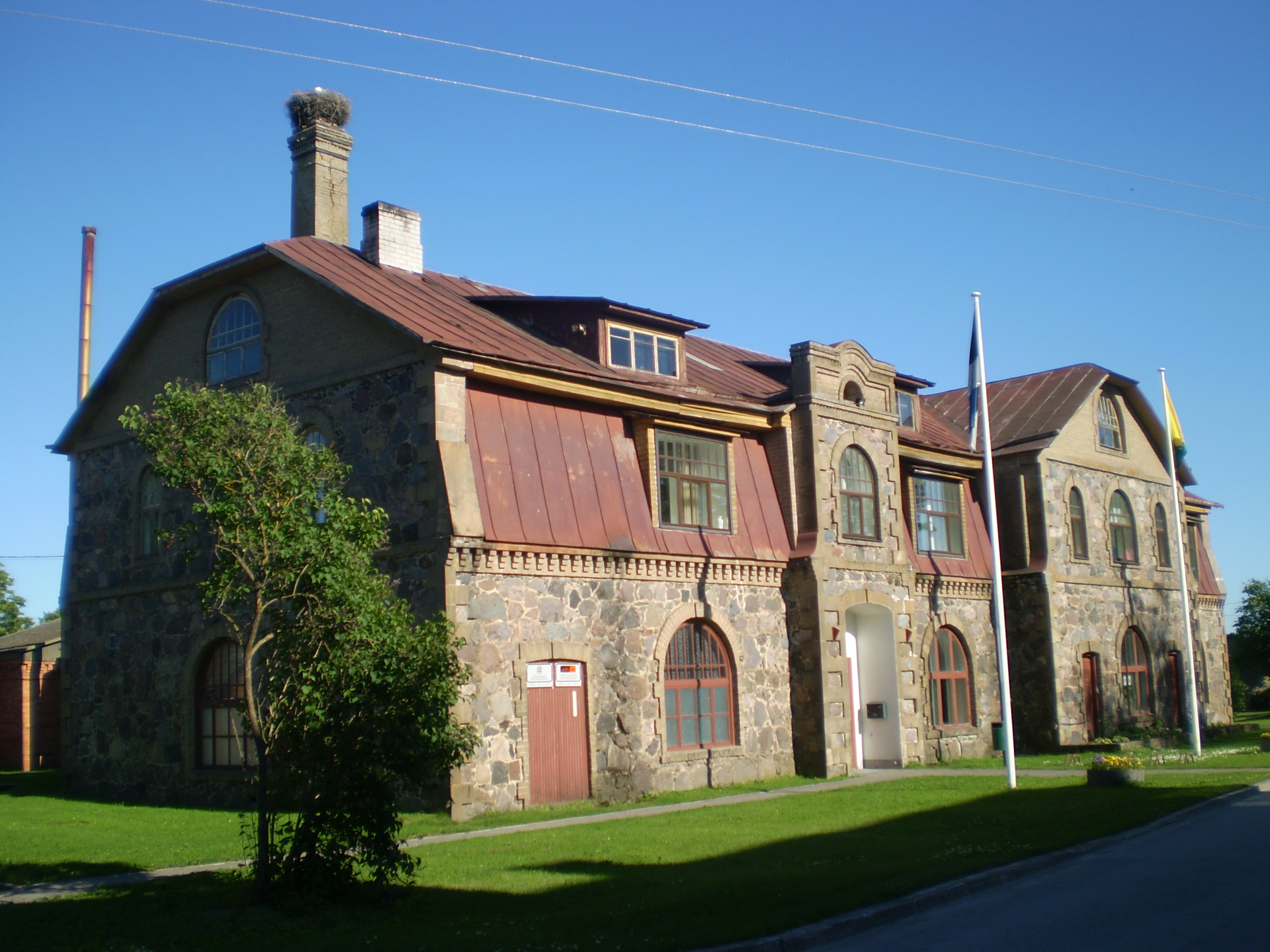
Laekvere dairy house

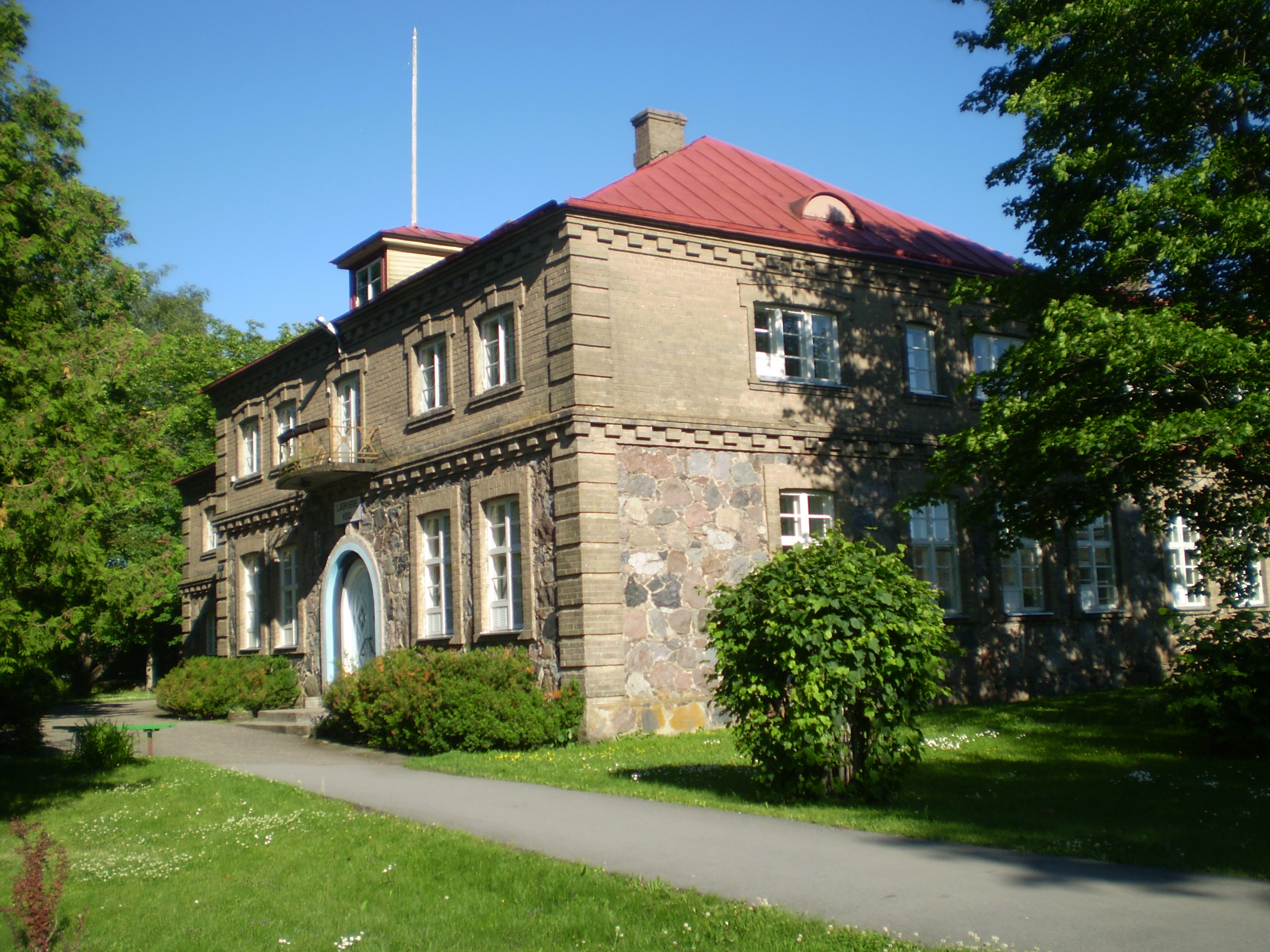
Laekvere schoolhouse

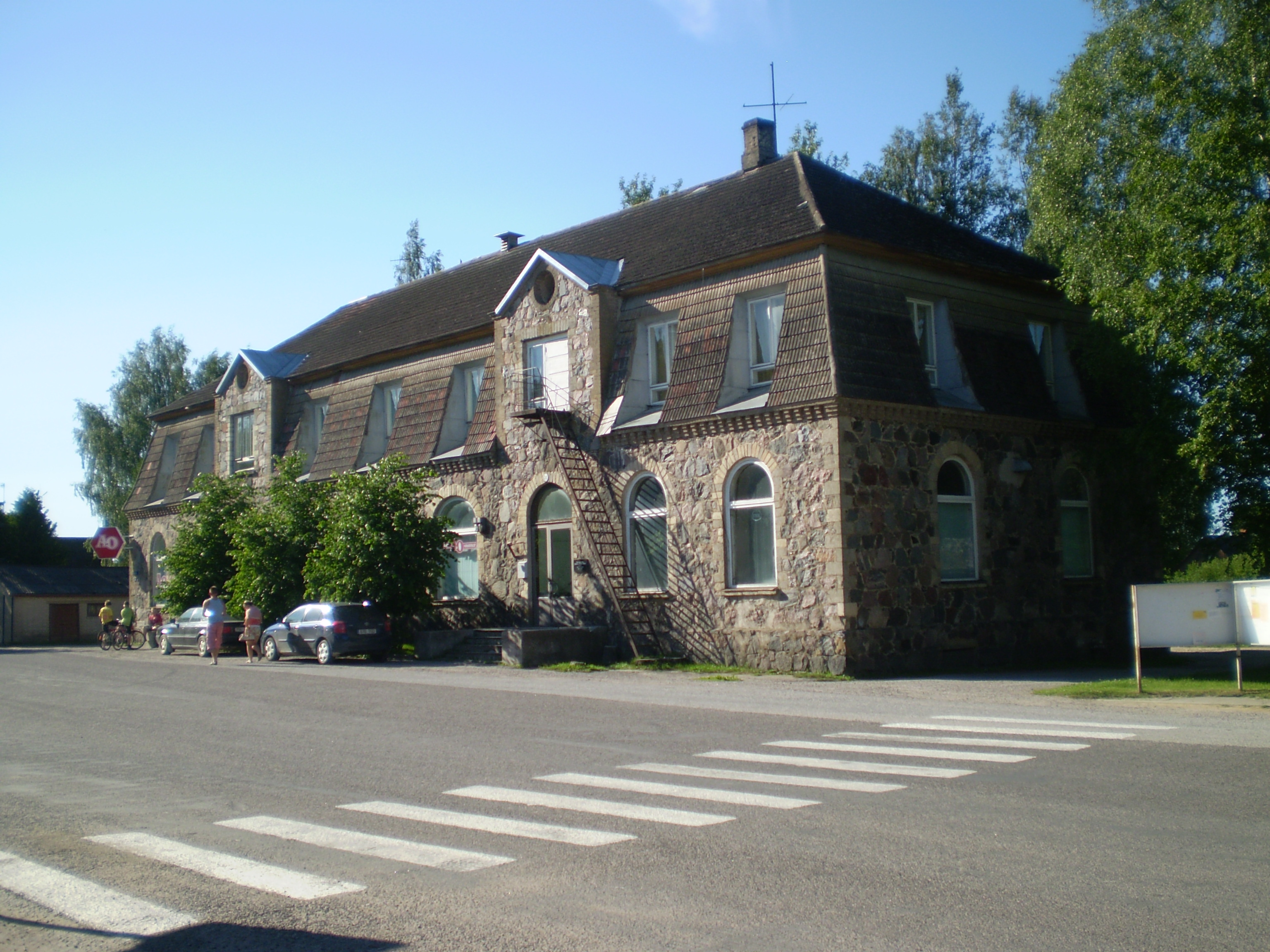
Laekvere business house

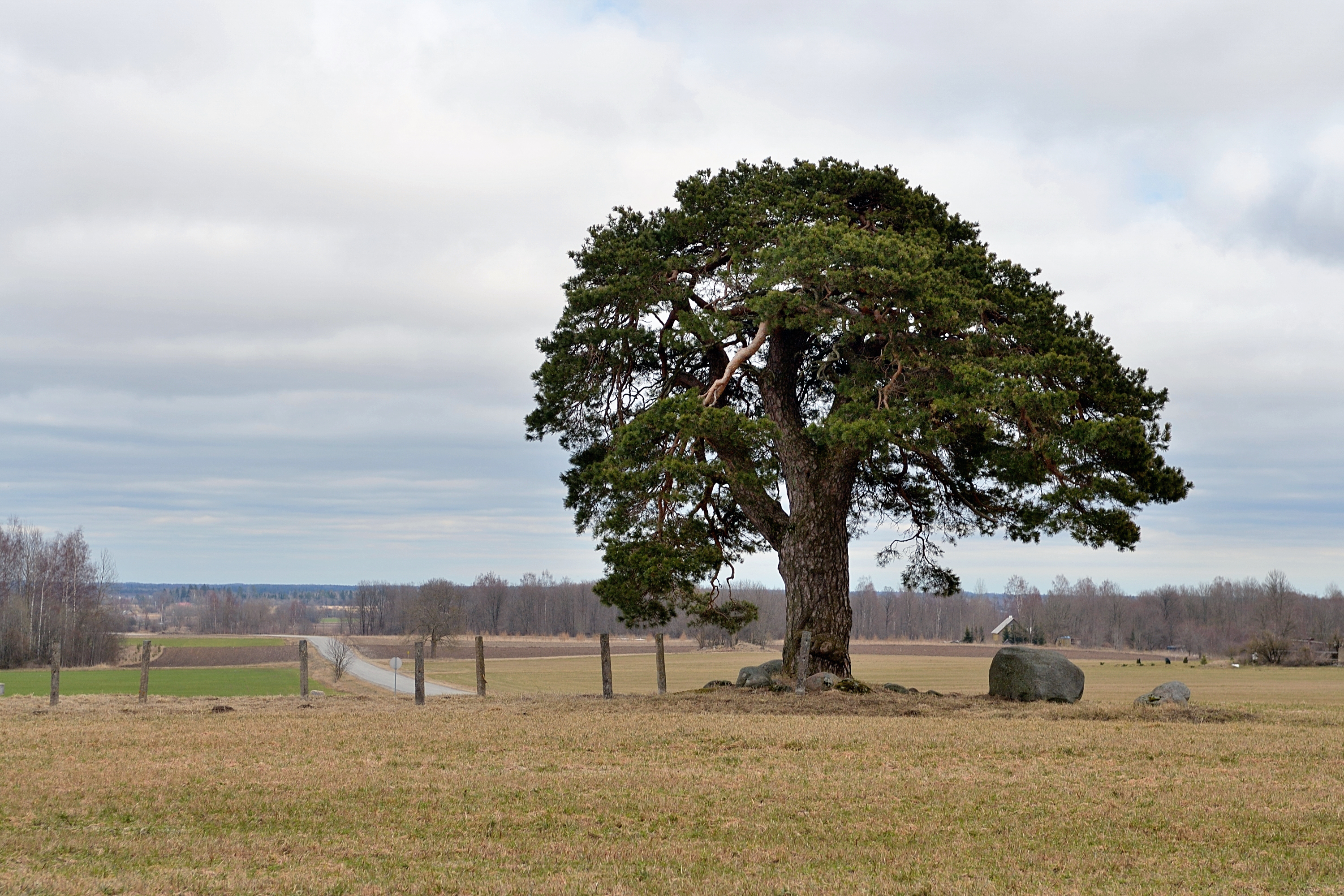
Laekvere pine
