= Neeruti, Lääne-Viru County =

Village in Estonia

Coordinates: 59°18′44″N 26°09′48″E

Neeruti
- Village
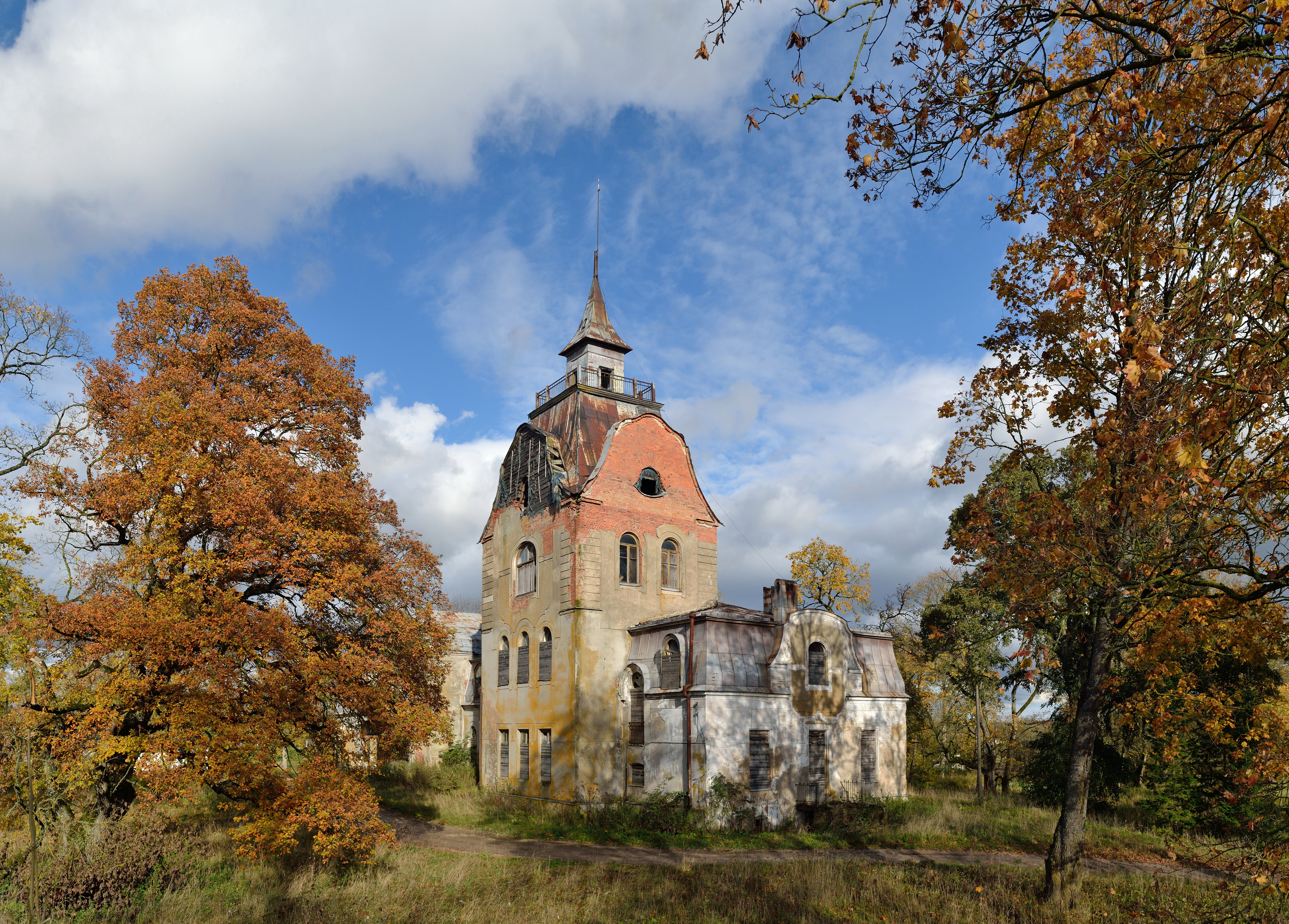
- Neeruti Manor
- Interactive map of Neeruti
- Country: Estonia
- County: Lääne-Viru County
- Parish: Kadrina Parish
- Time zone: UTC+2 (EET)
  - Summer (DST): UTC+3 (EEST)

Neeruti (until 1920: Buxhoewden) is a village in Kadrina Parish, Lääne-Viru County, in northeastern Estonia. It lies on the left bank of the Loobu River. Neeruti is known for its manor (at that time Buxhöwden castle) now in ruins, built in Jugendstil for Count von Rehbinder.
