= Lääne-Viru County =

County of Estonia

Coordinates: 59°20′58″N 26°20′53″E

Lääne-Viru County Lääne-Virumaa
- County
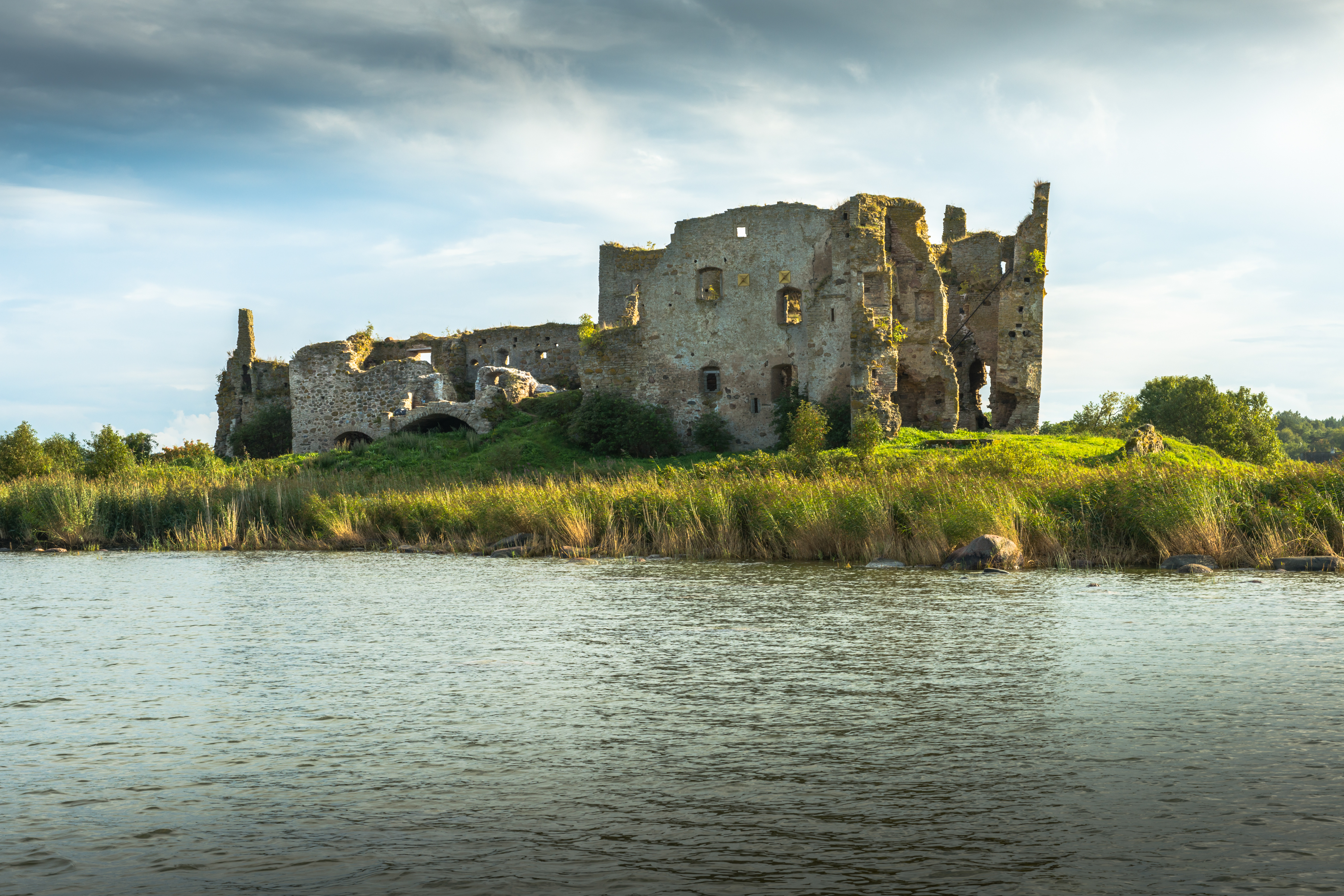

- Flag Coat of arms

- Country: Estonia
- Capital: Rakvere

Area
  - Total: 3,695.72 km^{2} (1,426.93 sq mi)

Population (2022)
  - Total: 58,709
  - Rank: 5th
  - Density: 15.886/km^{2} (41.144/sq mi)

Ethnicity
  - Estonians: 87.3%
  - Russians: 9.2%
  - other: 3.6%

GDP
  - Total: €1.074 billion (2022)
  - Per capita: €18,150 (2022)
- ISO 3166 code: EE-60
- Vehicle registration: R

Lääne-Viru County (Estonian: Lääne-Viru maakond or Lääne-Virumaa) is one of 15 counties of Estonia. It is in northern Estonia, on the south coast of the Gulf of Finland. In Estonian, lääne means 'western' and ida means 'east' or 'eastern'. Lääne-Viru borders Ida-Viru County to the east, Jõgeva County to the south, and Järva and Harju counties to the west. In January 2013, Lääne-Viru County had a population of 58,806, or 4.5% of the population of Estonia.

== History ==
In prehistoric times, Lääne-Virumaa was settled by Estonians of the Vironian tribe.

=== County government ===
Until 2017, the County Government (Estonian: maavalitsus), seated in Rakvere, was led by a governor (Estonian: maavanem), who was appointed by the Government of Estonia. Since 2014, the governor position was held by Marko Torm.

== Municipalities ==
The county is subdivided into municipalities. There is one urban municipality (Estonian: linnad 'towns') and seven rural municipalities (Estonian: vallad 'parishes') in Lääne-Viru County.

Rank	Municipality	Type	Population (2018)	Area km^{2}	Density
1	Haljala Parish	Rural	4,389	547	8.0
2	Kadrina Parish	Rural	4,958	355	14.0
3	Rakvere Parish	Rural	5,566	296	18.8
4	Rakvere	Urban	15,613	11	1,419.4
5	Tapa Parish	Rural	11,252	479	23.5
6	Vinni Parish	Rural	6,919	1,013	6.8
7	Viru-Nigula Parish	Rural	5,981	311	19.2
8	Väike-Maarja Parish	Rural	6,016	683	8.8

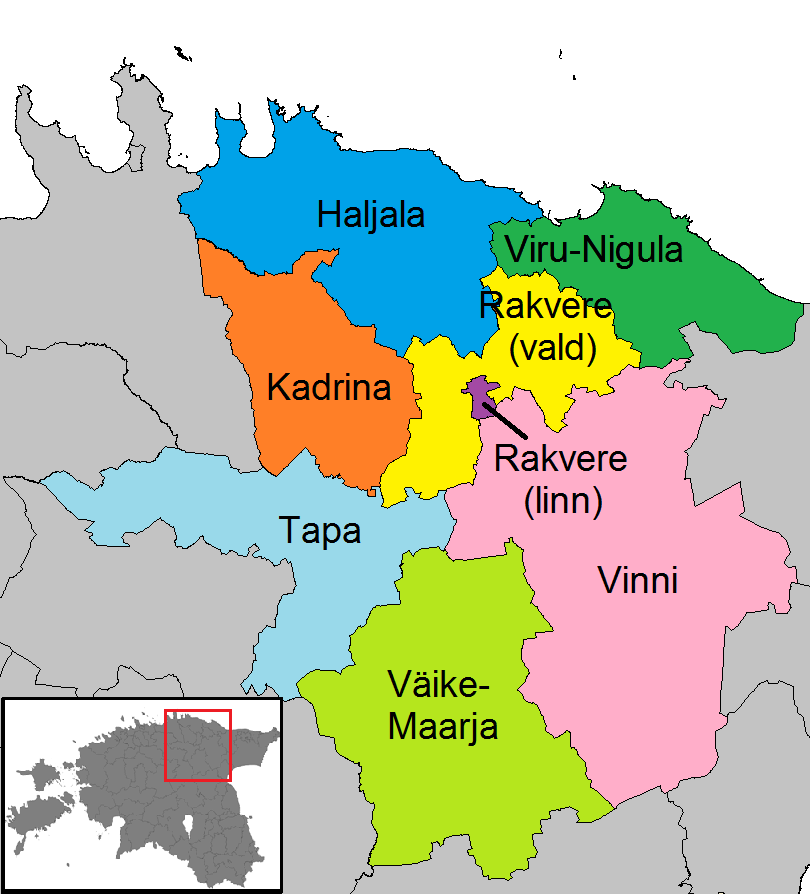
Municipalities of Lääne-Viru County

== Religion ==
The largest number of congregations in the county are of the Estonian Evangelical Lutheran Church (EELC): in Haljala, Kunda, Kadrina, Käsmu, Rakvere, Simuna, Tamsalu, Viru-Jaagupi, Viru-Nigula and Väike-Maarja under EELC's Viru Deanery and in Tapa under EELC's Järva Deanery.

Eastern Orthodox congregations in the county are predominantly under the administration of the Estonian Apostolic Orthodox Church but some of them are also under the Estonian Orthodox Church of the Moscow Patriarchate.

Several congregations of Baptists, a catholic congregation in Rakvere and other Christian churches operate in the county.

Religious affiliations in Lääne-Viru, census 2000–2021*
Religion	2000		2011		2021	
Religion	Number	%	Number	%	Number	%
Christianity	10,764	19.9	8,429	16.7	8,040	15.9
—Orthodox Christians	2,152	4.0	2,777	5.5	3,040	6.1
—Lutherans	7,498	12.9	4,755	9.4	3,730	7.5
—Catholics	162	0.3	98	0.2	120	0.2
—Baptists	294	0.5	166	0.3	190	0.4
—Jehovah's Witnesses	234	0.4	187	0.3	170	0.3
—Pentecostals	135	0.2	102	0.2	170	0.3
—Old Believers	10	0.01	20	0.03	-	-
—Methodists	136	0.2	77	0.1	40	0.08
—Adventists	143	0.2	76	0.1	160	0.3
—Other Christians	-	-	171	0.3	420	0.8
Islam	23	0.03	26	0.05	20	0.04
Buddhism	-	-	30	0.05	50	0.1
Other religions**	237	0.4	361	0.7	680	1.3
No religion	24,820	46.0	35,239	69.8	35,790	72.3
Not stated***	10,249	19.0	6,444	12.7	4,910	9.9
Total population*	53,957		50,425		49,490	
*The censuses of Estonia count the religious affiliations of the population older than 15 years of age. ".

== Images ==
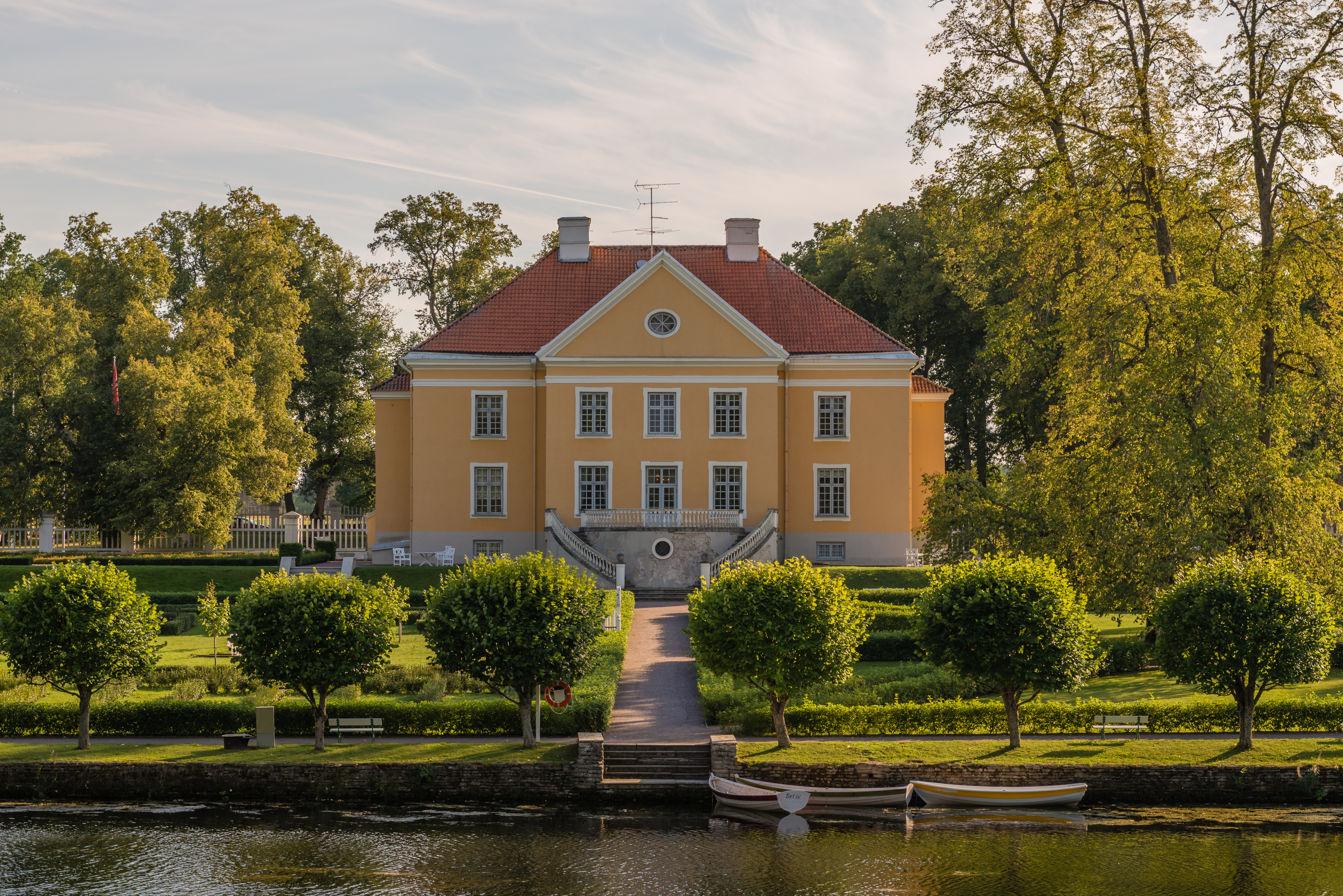
Palmse manor

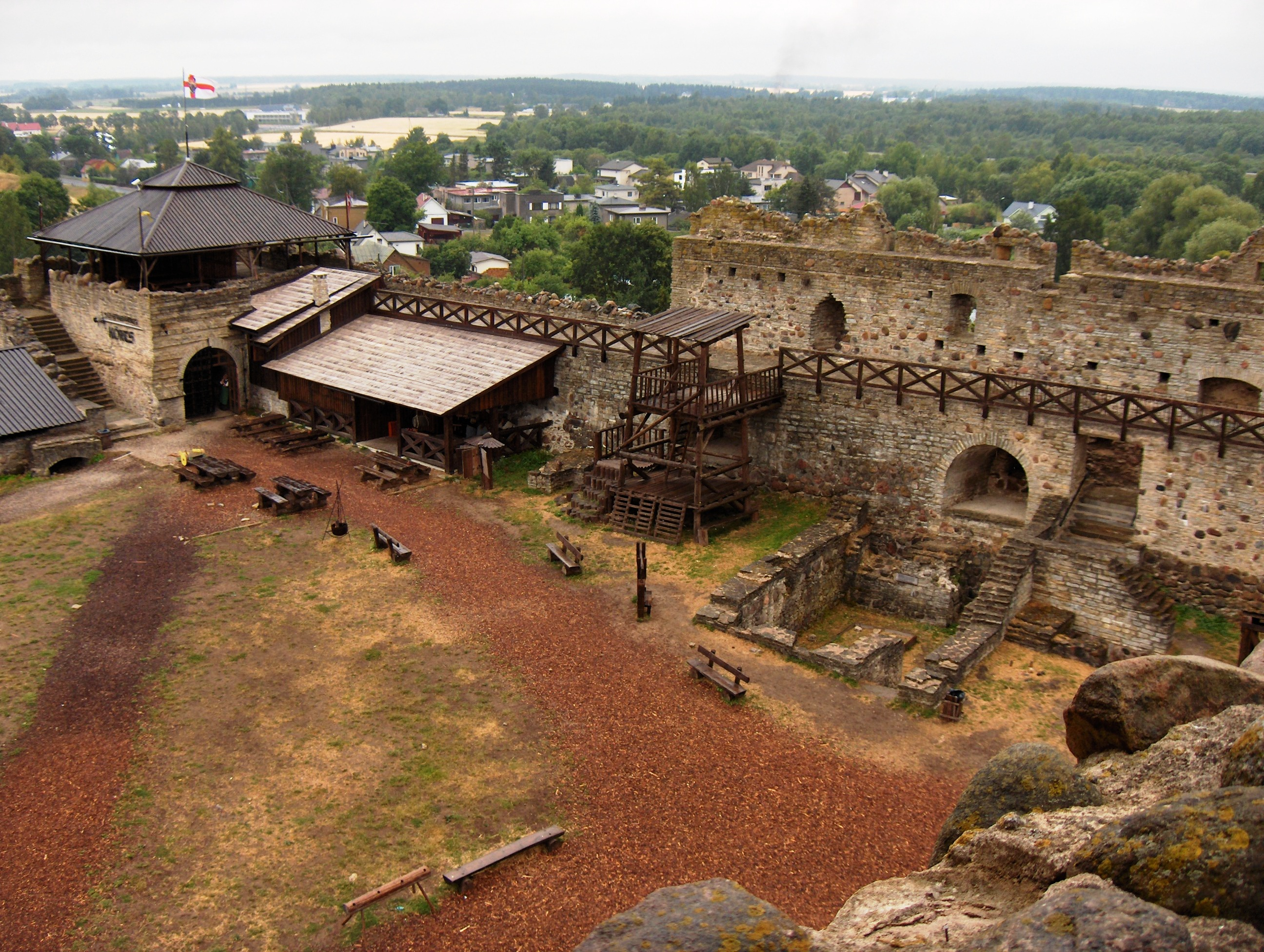
Rakvere Castle

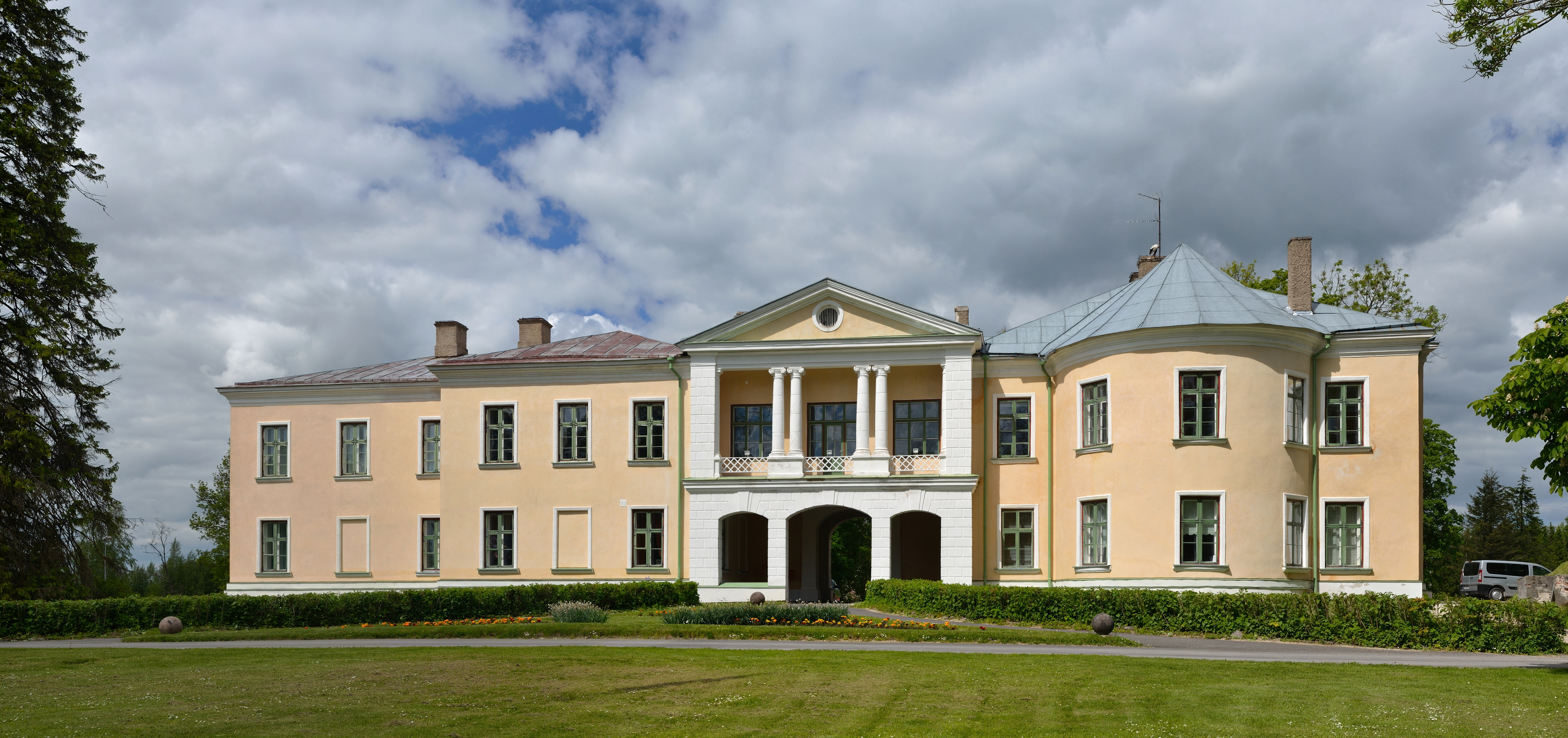
Mõdriku manor

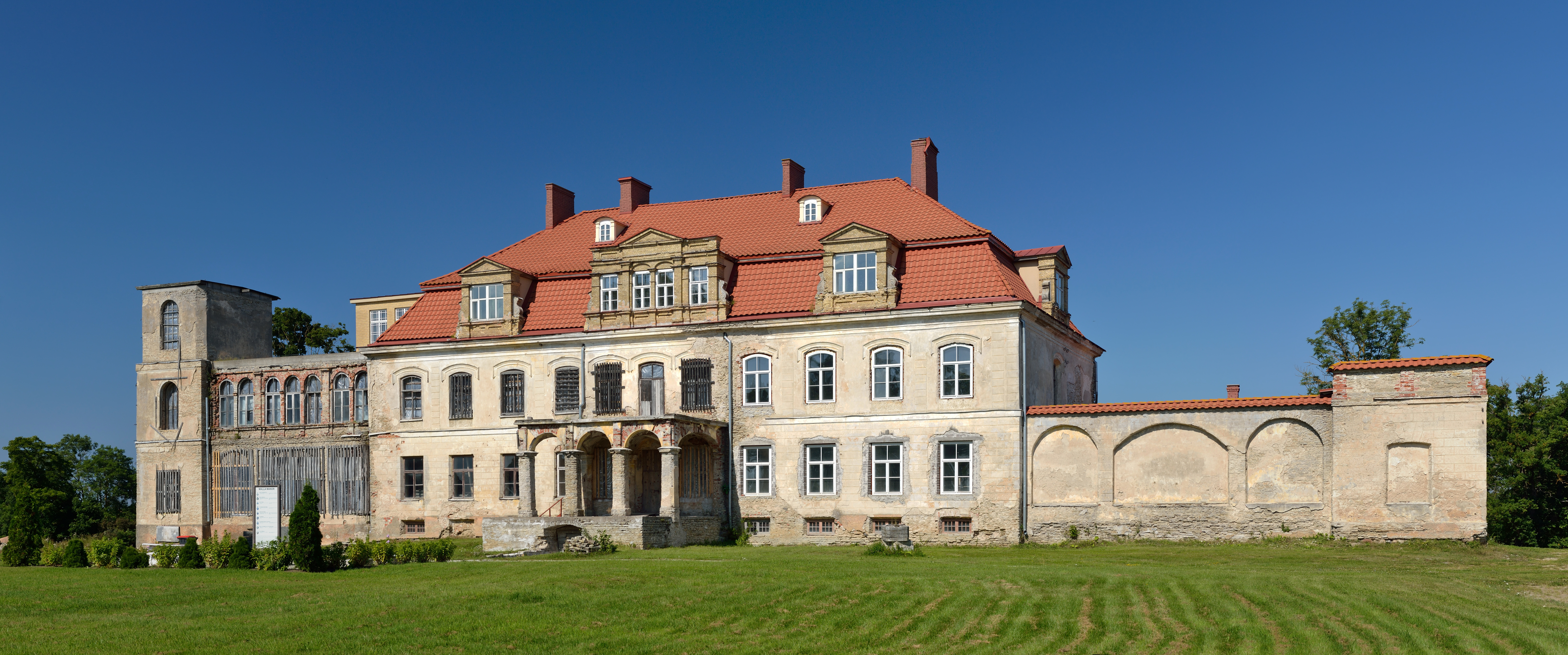
Malla manor

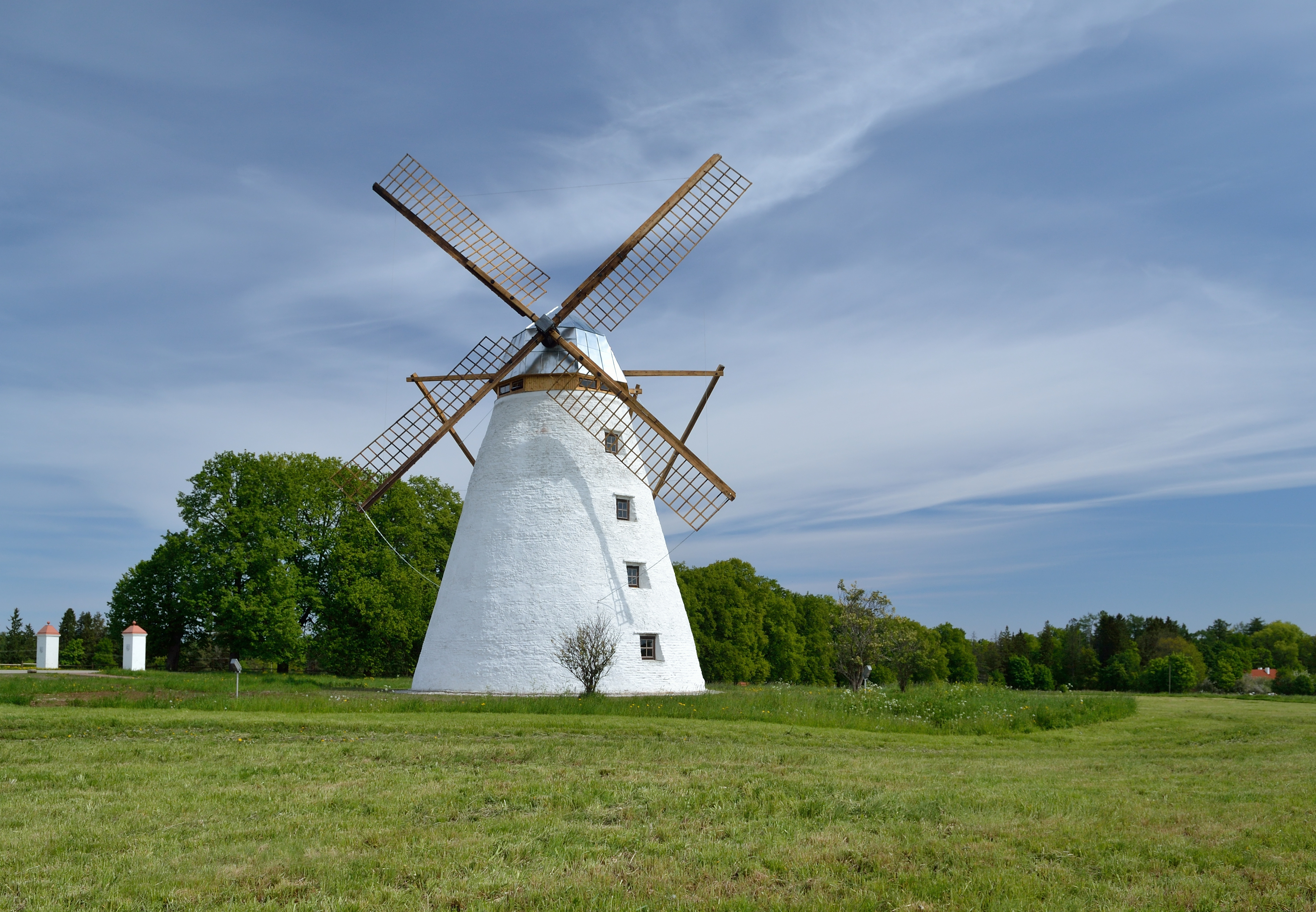
Vihula windmill

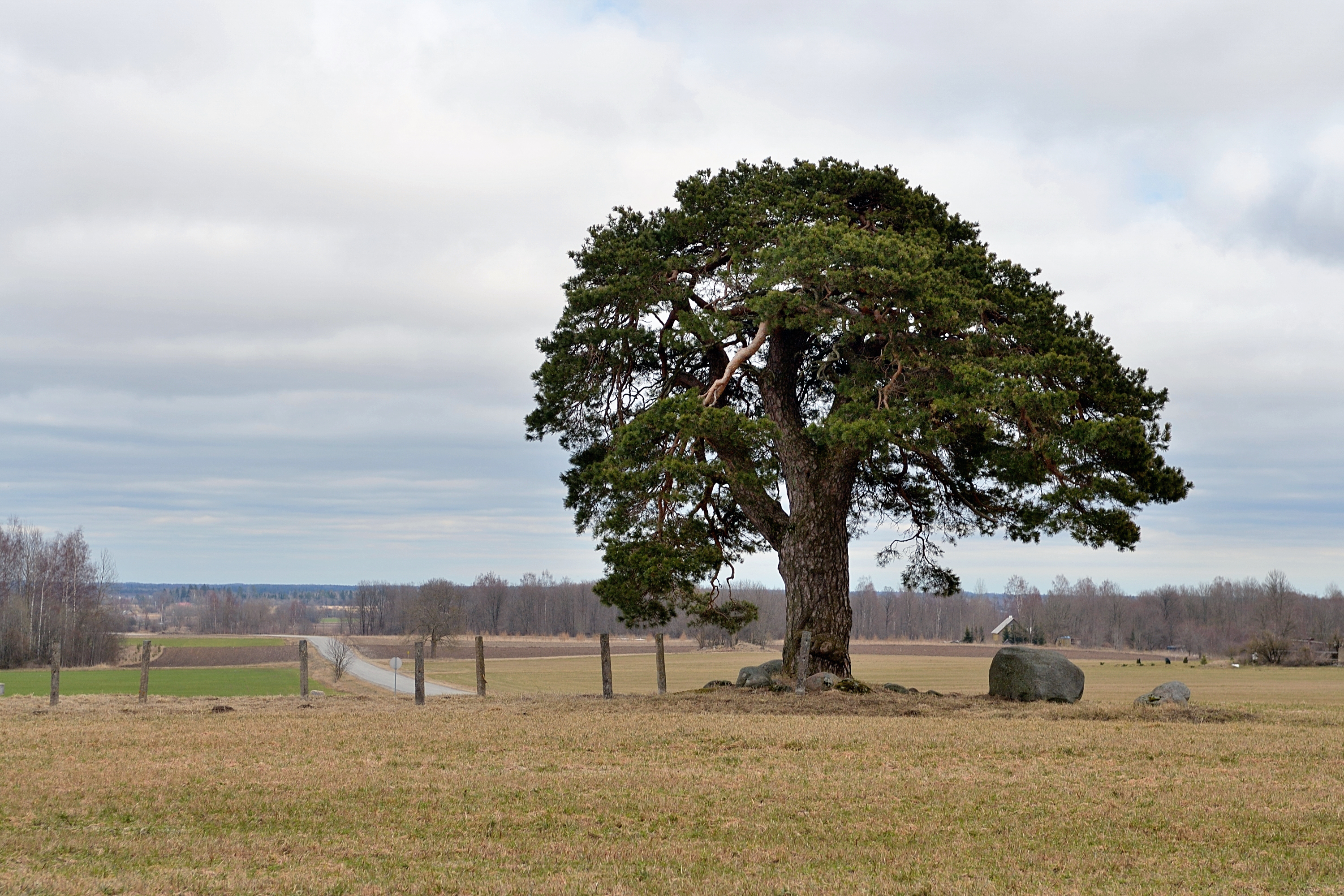
Laekvere pine

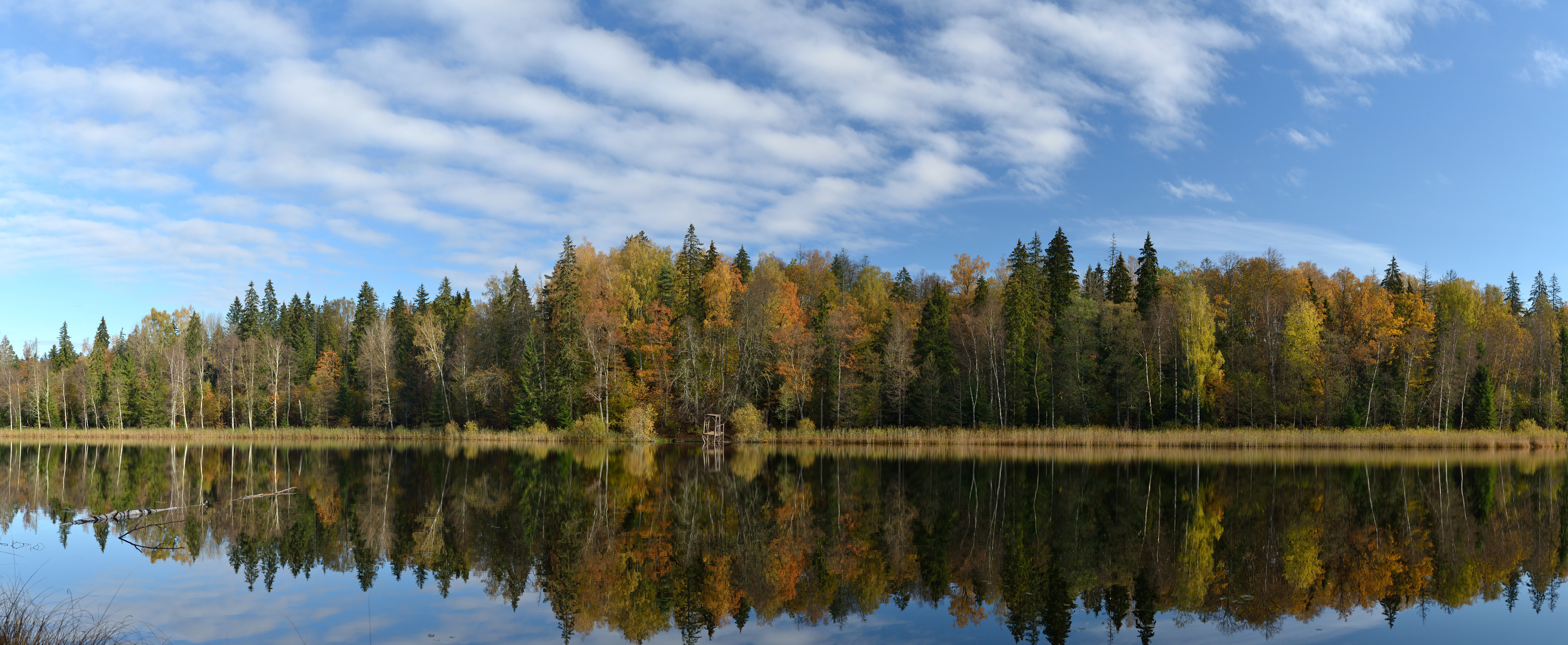
Lake Neeruti Tagajärv

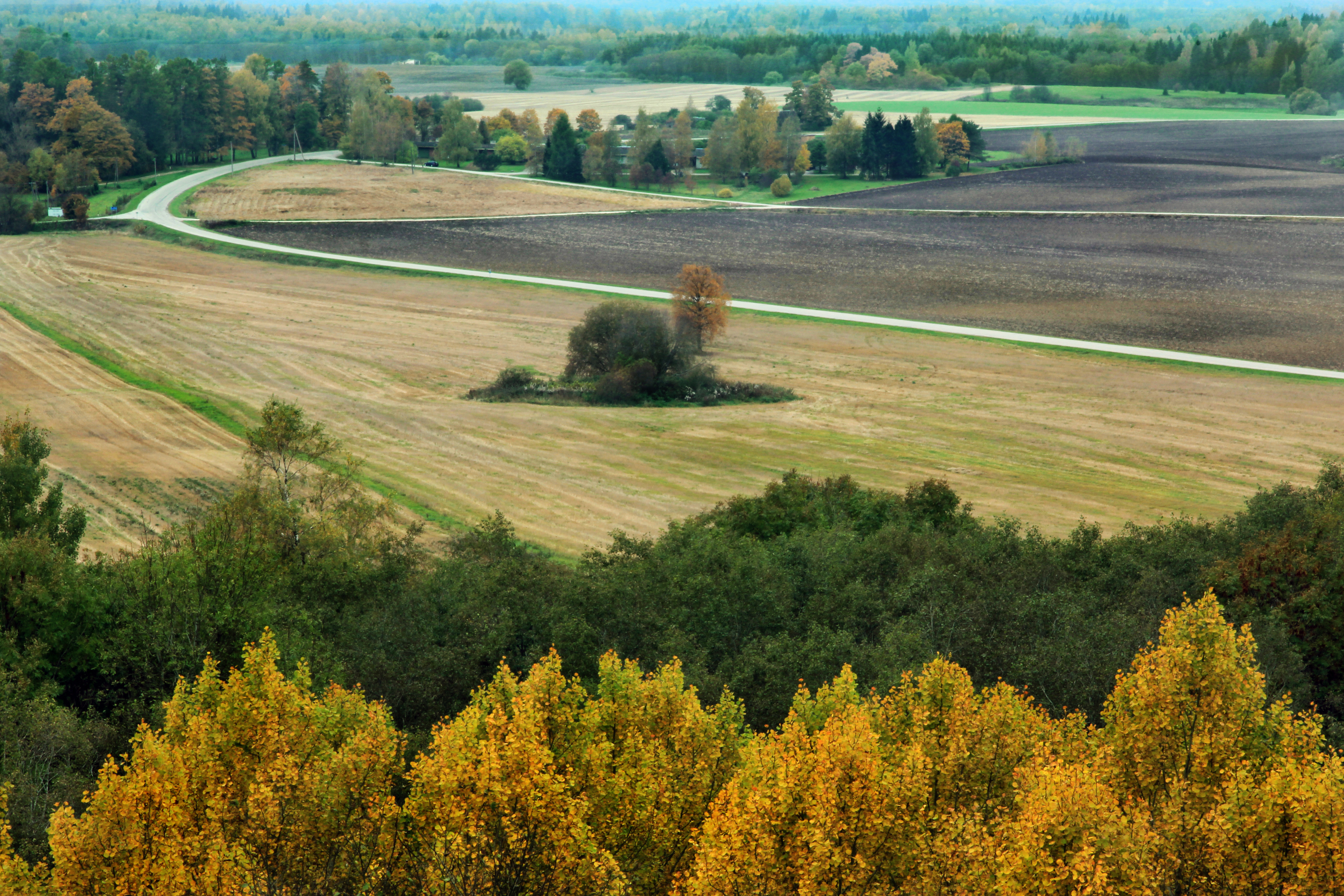
View from tower on the hill of Emumägi

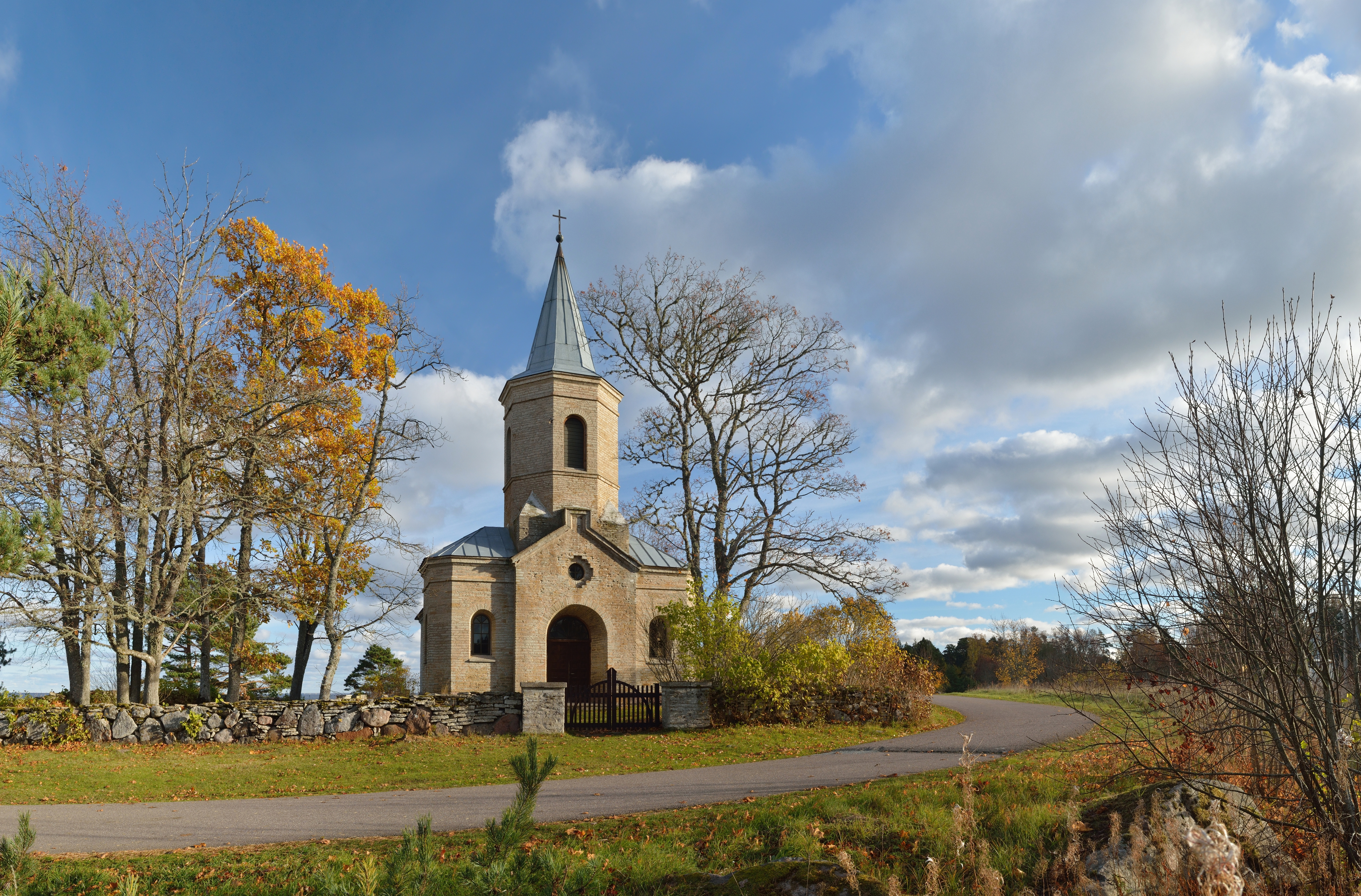
Vainupea Chapel

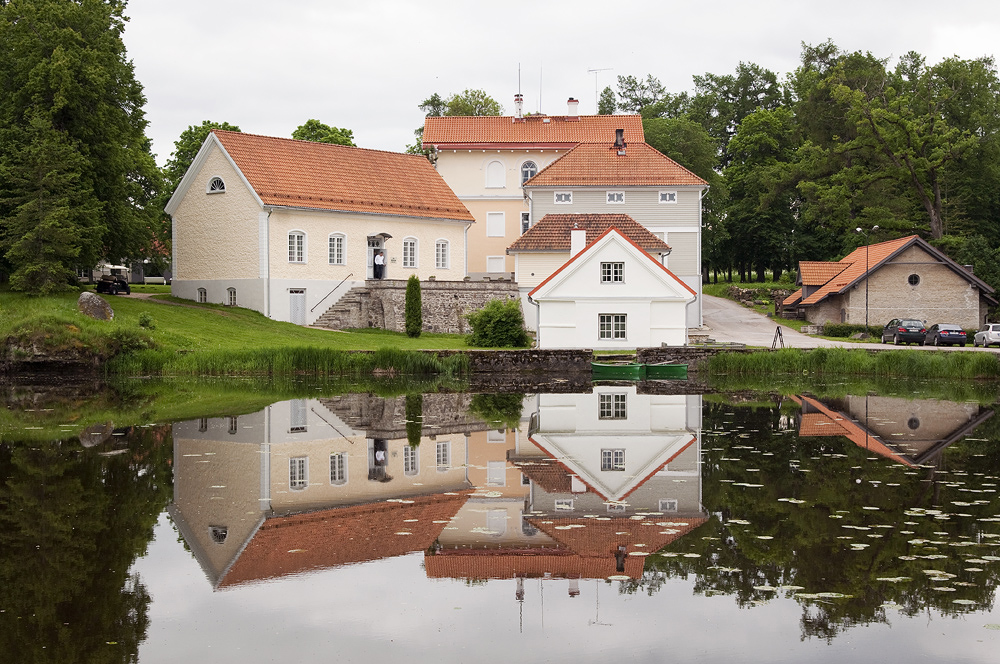
Vihula Manor

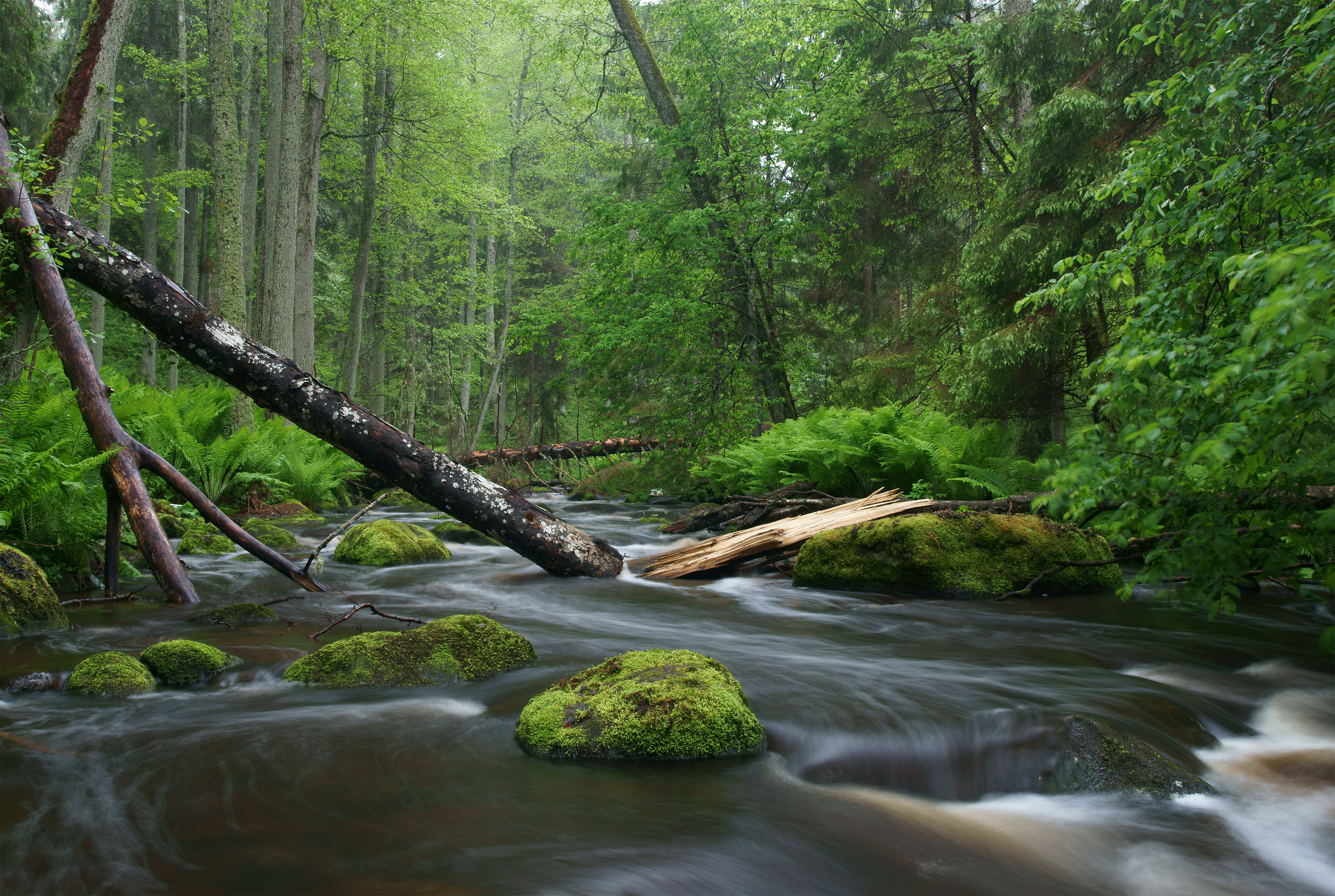
Altja river

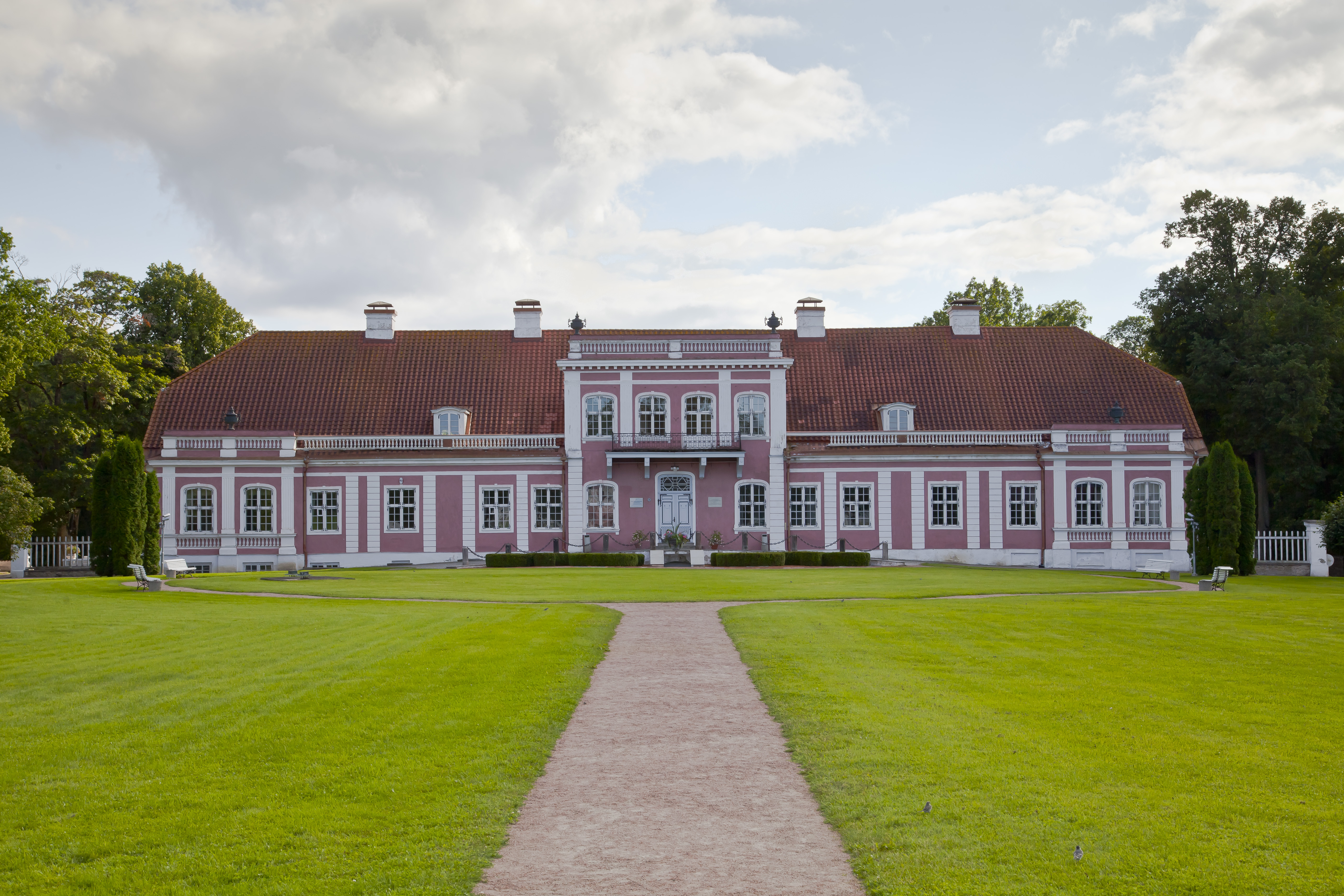
Sagadi manor

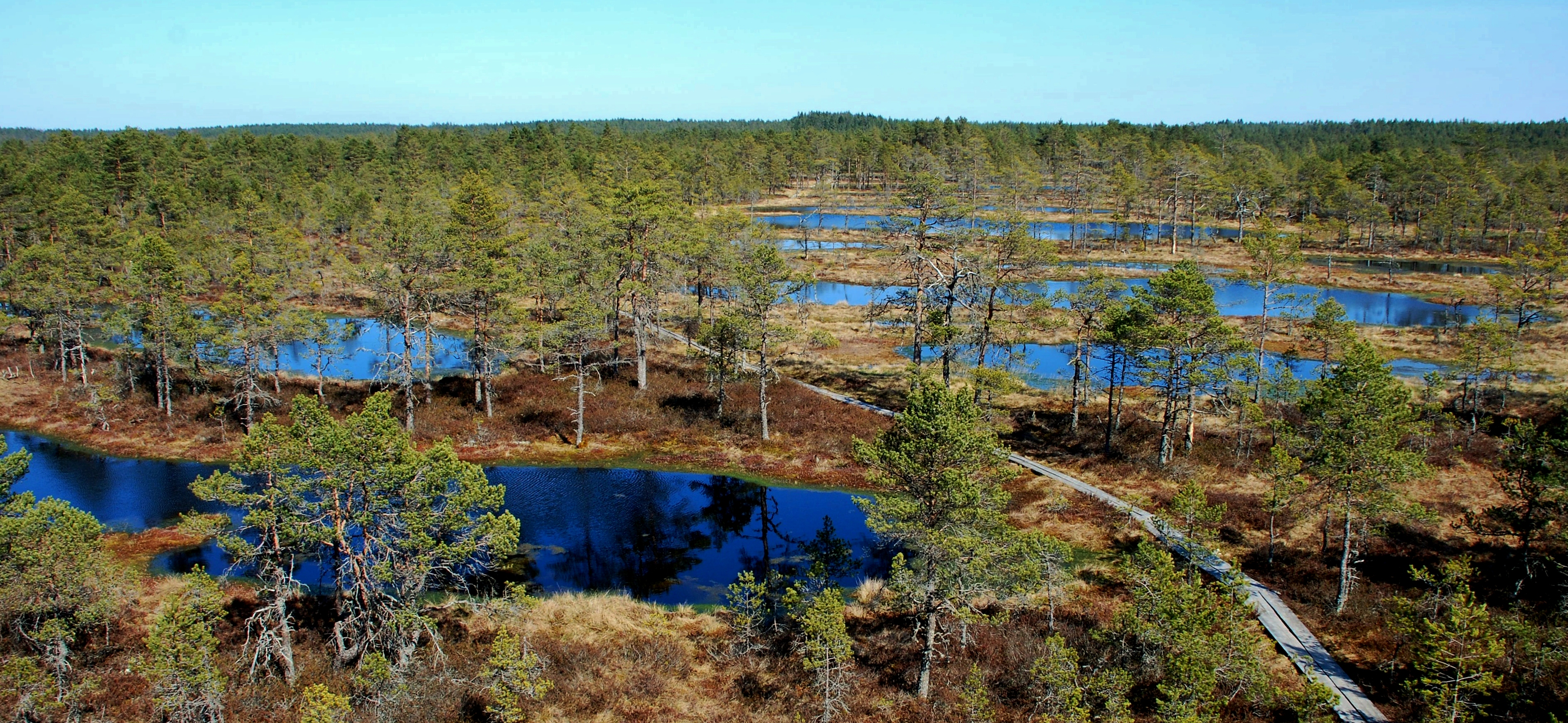
Viru bog in Lahemaa National Park

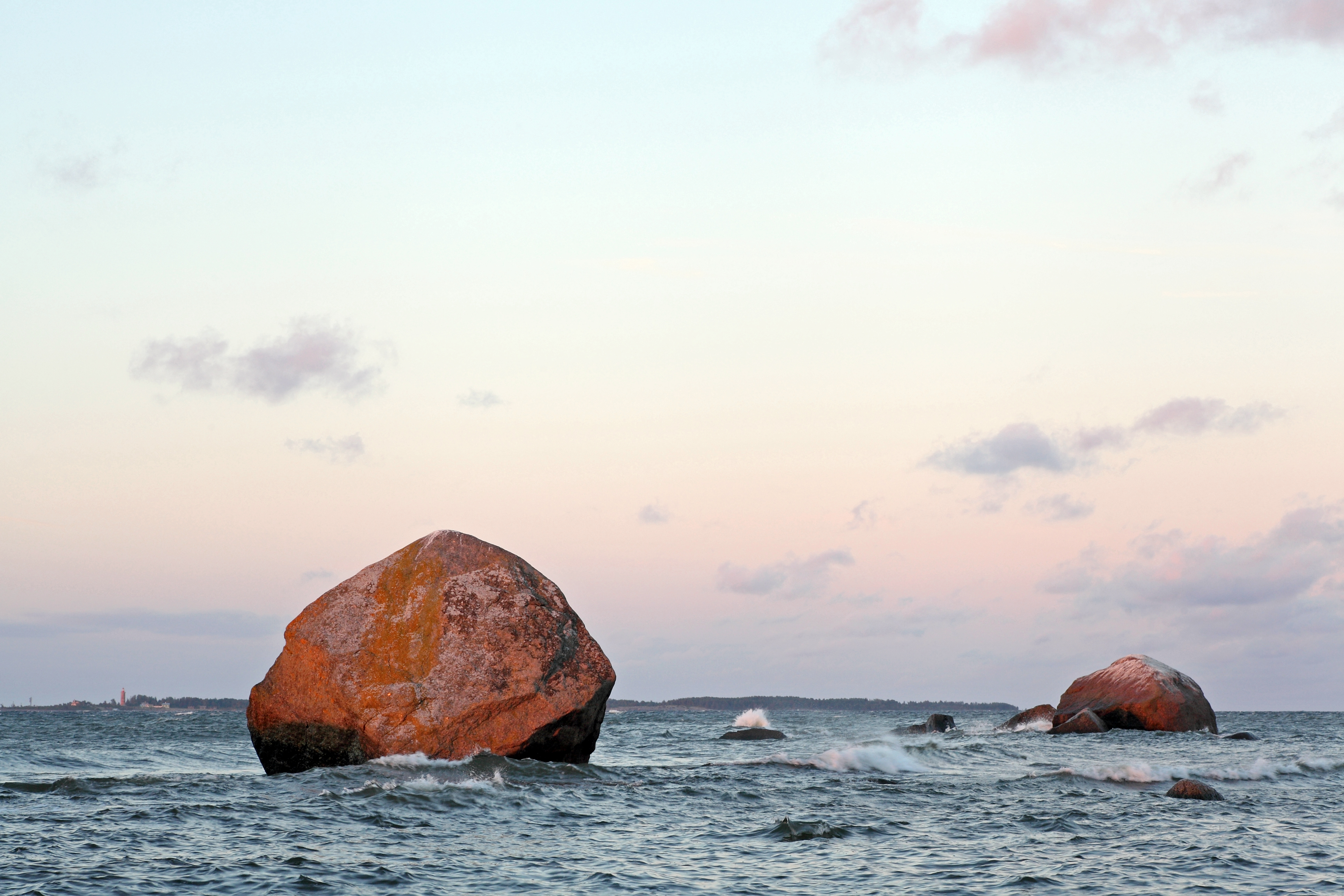
Mähu boulders in Lahemaa National Park

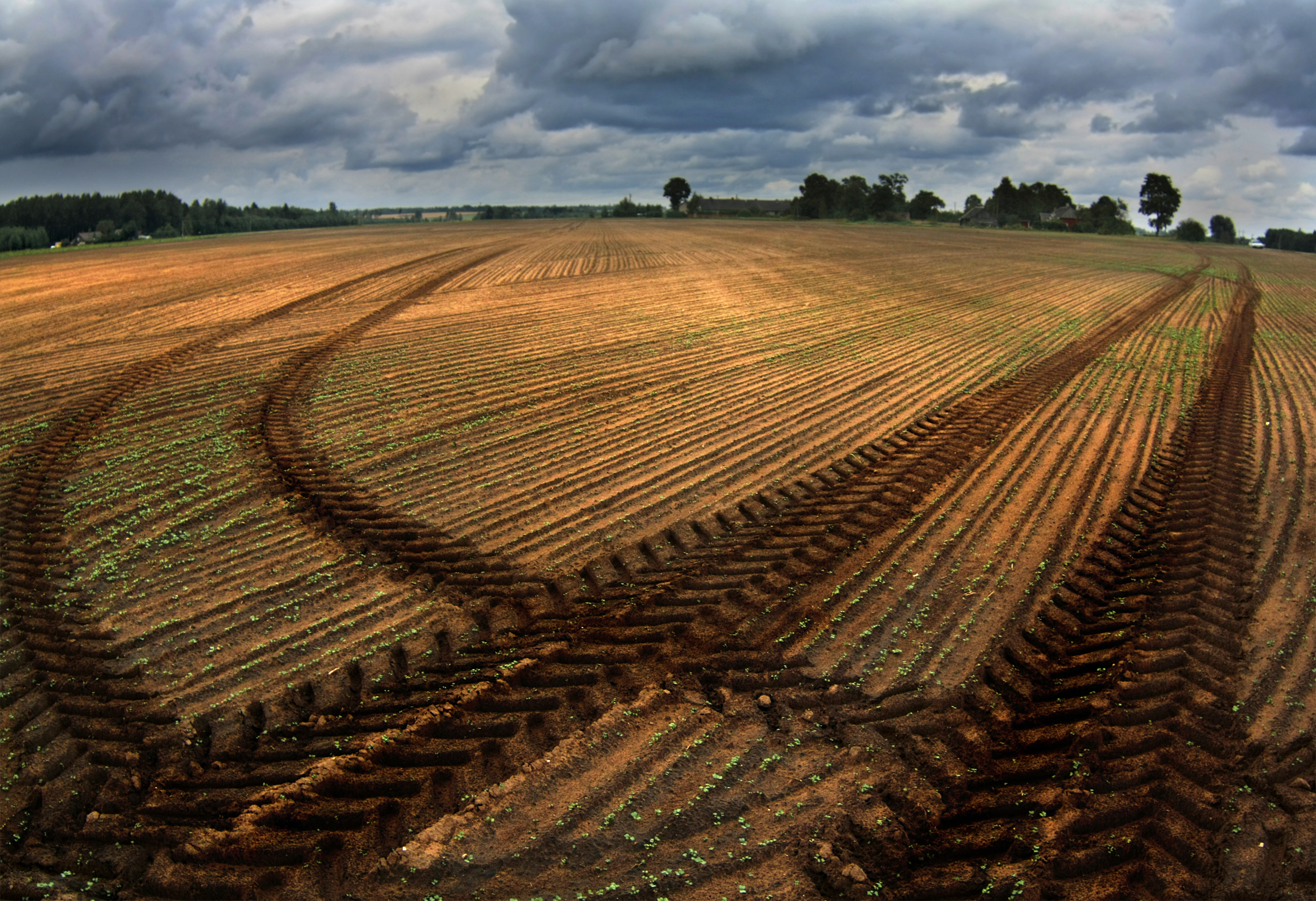
Rapeseed field near Laekvere

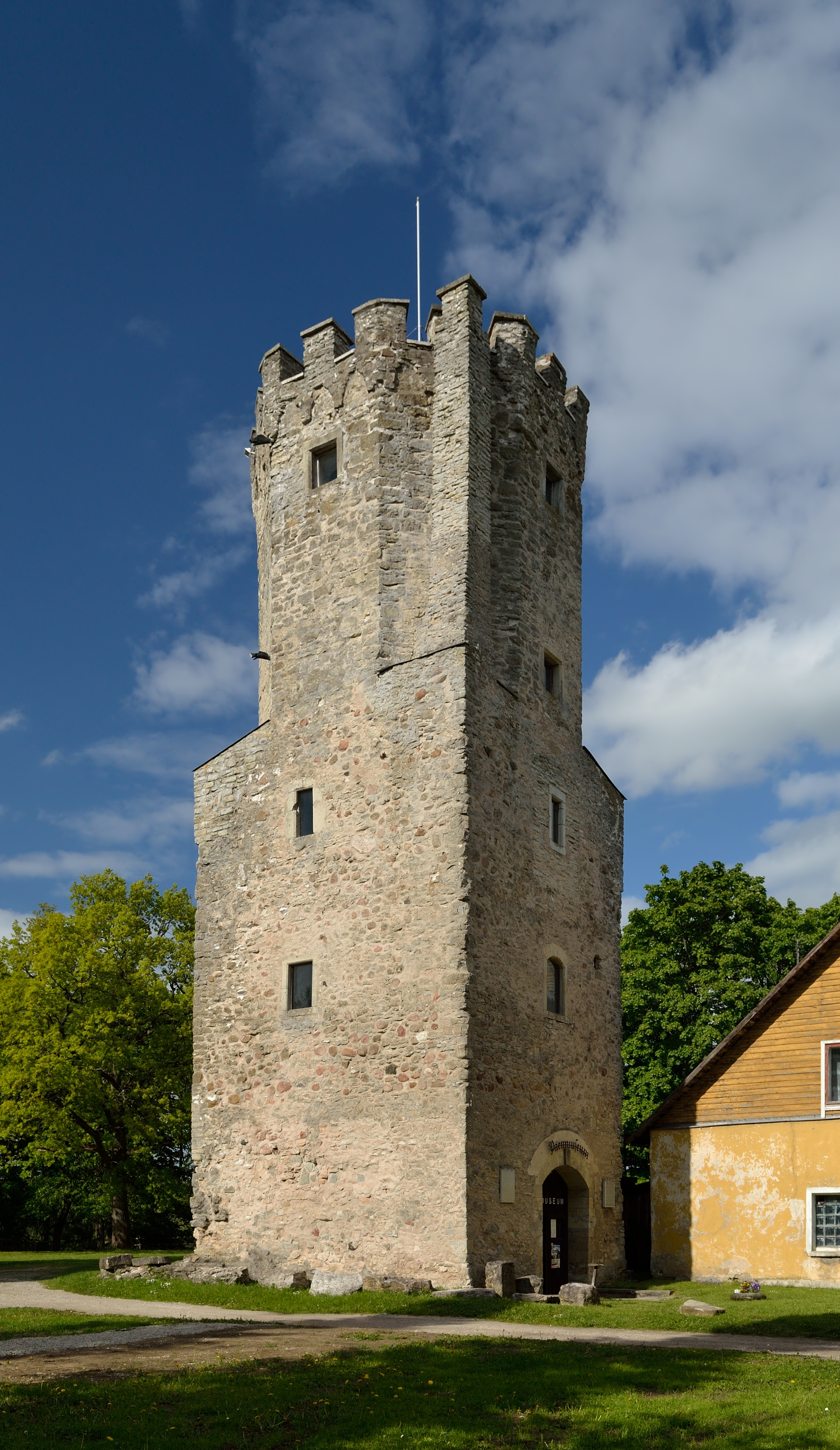
Porkuni Castle gate tower
